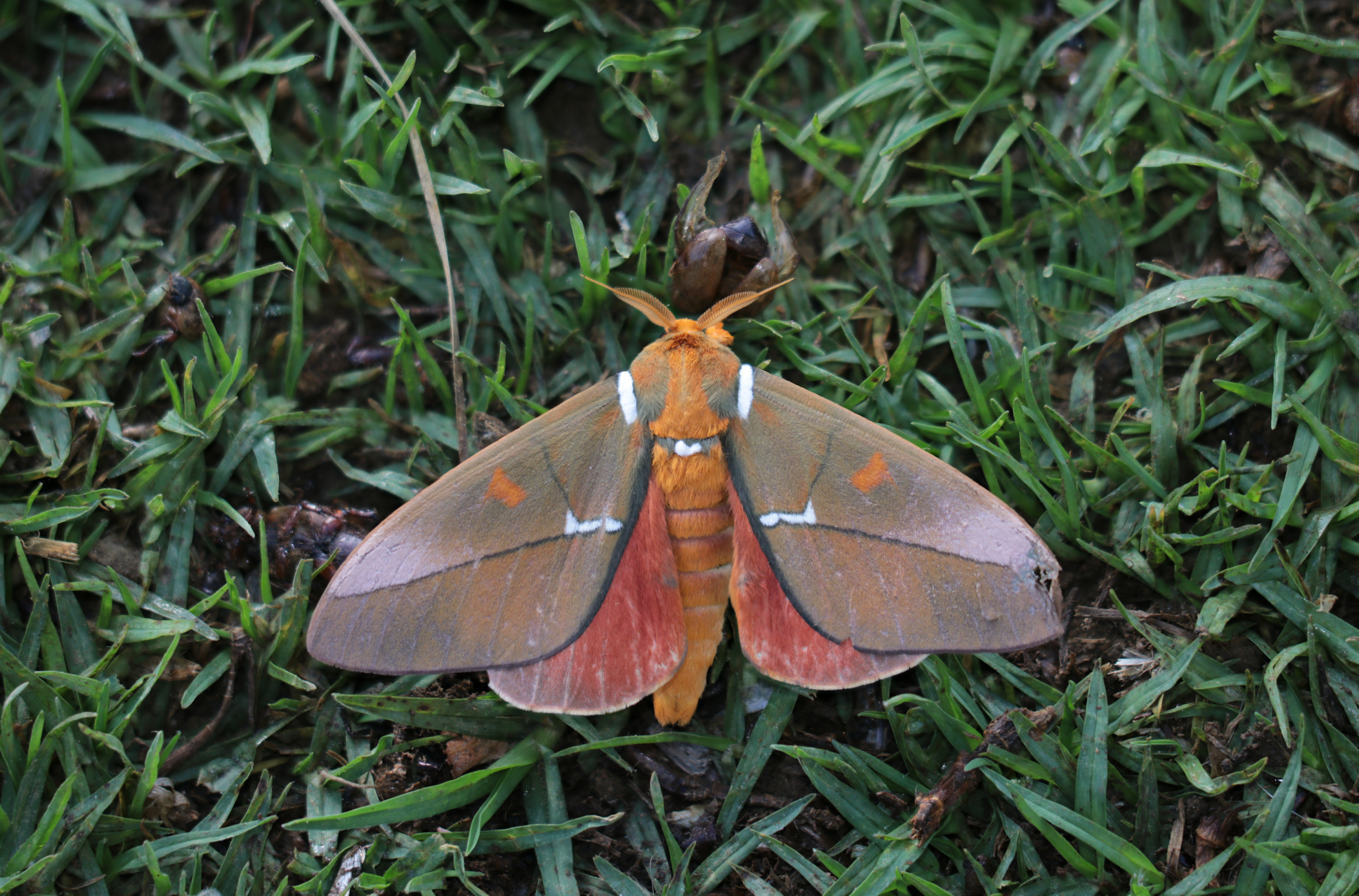
- S. santarosensis Mount Totumas cloud forest, Panama

Scientific classification
- Domain: Eukaryota
- Kingdom: Animalia
- Phylum: Arthropoda
- Class: Insecta
- Order: Lepidoptera
- Family: Saturniidae
- Subfamily: Ceratocampinae
- Genus: Schausiella; Bouvier, 1930

= Schausiella =

Genus of moths

Schausiella is a genus of moths in the family Saturniidae first described by Eugène Louis Bouvier in 1930.

== Species ==
- Schausiella arpi (Schaus, 1892)
- Schausiella carabaya (W. Rothschild, 1907)
- Schausiella denhezorum Lemaire, 1969
- Schausiella janeira (Schaus, 1892)
- Schausiella longispina (W. Rothschild, 1907)
- Schausiella moinieri Lemaire, 1969
- Schausiella polybia (Stoll, 1781)
- Schausiella santarosensis Lemaire, 1982
- Schausiella spitzi Travassos, 1958
- Schausiella subochreata (Schaus, 1904)
- Schausiella toulgoeti Lemaire, 1969
