= Almeidella =

Scientific classification
- Domain: Eukaryota
- Kingdom: Animalia
- Phylum: Arthropoda
- Class: Insecta
- Order: Lepidoptera
- Family: Saturniidae
- Subfamily: Ceratocampinae
- Genus: Almeidella; Oiticica, 1946

Genus of moths

Almeidella is a genus of moths in the family Saturniidae first described by Oiticica in 1946.

== Species ==
- Almeidella almeidai Oiticica, 1946
- Almeidella approximans (Schaus, 1920)
- Almeidella corrupta (Schaus, 1913)
