= Neorcarnegia =

Scientific classification
- Domain: Eukaryota
- Kingdom: Animalia
- Phylum: Arthropoda
- Class: Insecta
- Order: Lepidoptera
- Family: Saturniidae
- Subfamily: Ceratocampinae
- Genus: Neorcarnegia; Draudt, 1930

Genus of moths

Neorcarnegia is a genus of moths in the family Saturniidae first described by Max Wilhelm Karl Draudt in 1930.

== Species ==
- Neorcarnegia basirei (Schaus, 1892)
- Neorcarnegia bispinosa Naumann, 2006
