= Psilopygoides =

Scientific classification
- Domain: Eukaryota
- Kingdom: Animalia
- Phylum: Arthropoda
- Class: Insecta
- Order: Lepidoptera
- Family: Saturniidae
- Subfamily: Ceratocampinae
- Genus: Psilopygoides; Michener, 1949

Genus of moths

Psilopygoides is a genus of moths in the family Saturniidae erected by Charles Duncan Michener in 1949.

== Species ==
- Psilopygoides oda (Schaus, 1905)
