= Dacunju =

Scientific classification
- Domain: Eukaryota
- Kingdom: Animalia
- Phylum: Arthropoda
- Class: Insecta
- Order: Lepidoptera
- Family: Saturniidae
- Subfamily: Ceratocampinae
- Genus: Dacunju; Travassos & Noronha, 1965

Genus of moths

Dacunju is a genus of moths in the family Saturniidae first described by Travassos and Noronha in 1965.

== Species ==
- Dacunju jucunda (Walker, 1855)
