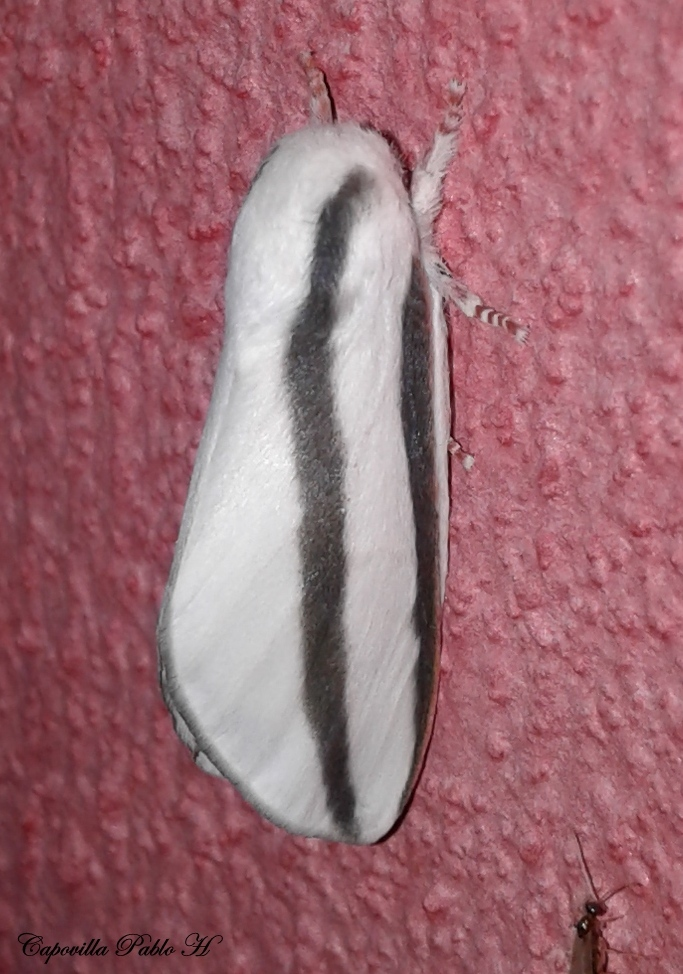
- Giacomellia bilineata

Scientific classification
- Domain: Eukaryota
- Kingdom: Animalia
- Phylum: Arthropoda
- Class: Insecta
- Order: Lepidoptera
- Family: Saturniidae
- Subfamily: Ceratocampinae
- Genus: Giacomellia; Bouvier, 1930

= Giacomellia =

Genus of moths

Giacomellia is a genus of moths in the family Saturniidae first described by Eugène Louis Bouvier in 1930.

== Species ==
- Giacomellia bilineata (Burmeister, 1878)
- Giacomellia inversa (Giacomelli, 1911)
