= Jaiba (moth) =

Scientific classification
- Domain: Eukaryota
- Kingdom: Animalia
- Phylum: Arthropoda
- Class: Insecta
- Order: Lepidoptera
- Family: Saturniidae
- Subfamily: Ceratocampinae
- Genus: Jaiba; Lemaire, Tangerini & Mielke, 1999

Genus of moths

Jaiba is a genus of moths in the family Saturniidae first described by Claude Lemaire, Nirton Tangerini and Olaf Hermann Hendrik Mielke in 1999.

== Species ==
- Jaiba kesselringi Lemaire, Tangerini & O. H. H. Mielke, 1999
