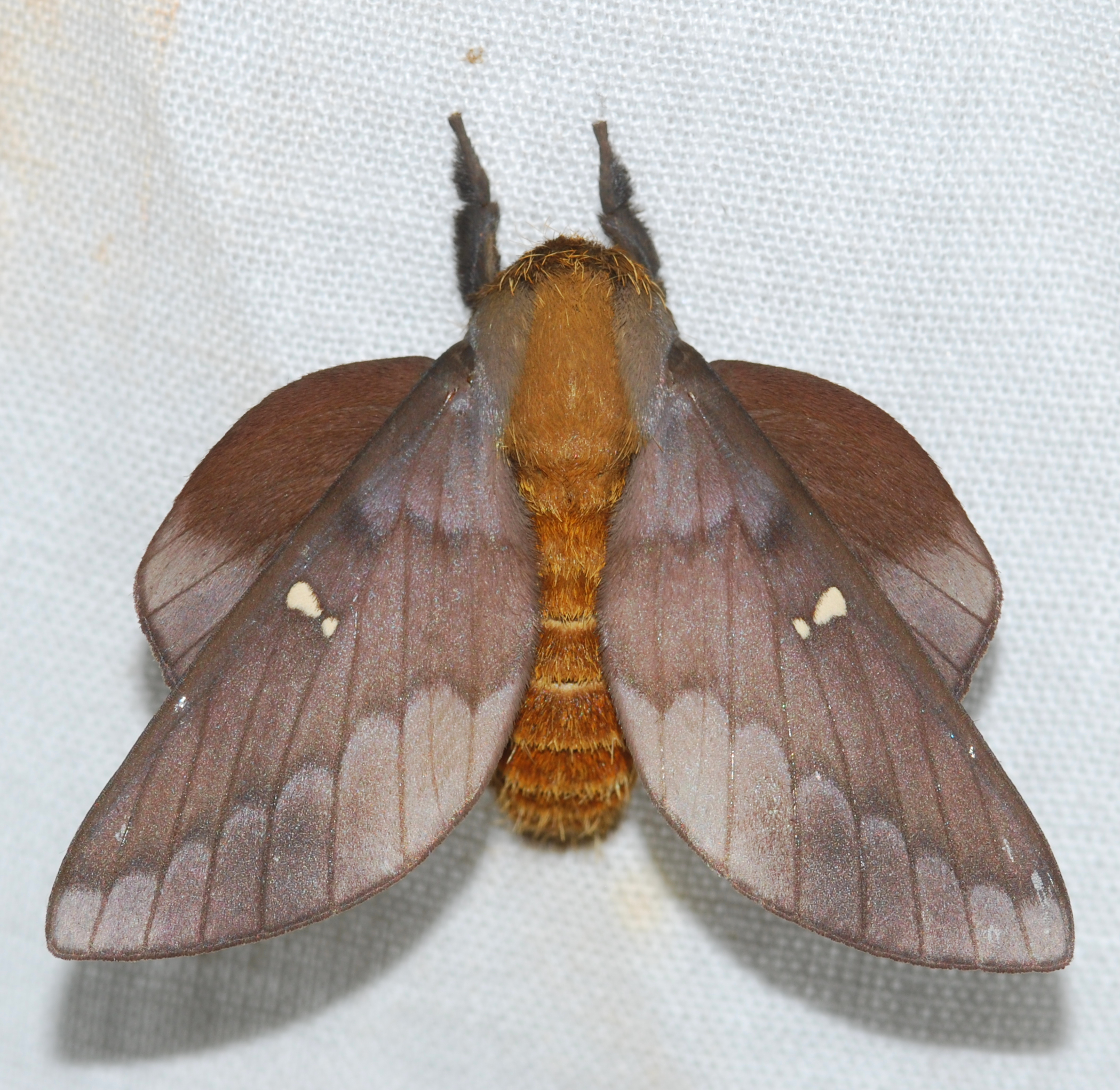
- Ptiloscola photophila

Scientific classification
- Domain: Eukaryota
- Kingdom: Animalia
- Phylum: Arthropoda
- Class: Insecta
- Order: Lepidoptera
- Family: Saturniidae
- Subfamily: Ceratocampinae
- Genus: Ptiloscola; Michener, 1949

= Ptiloscola =

Genus of moths

Ptiloscola is a genus of moths in the family Saturniidae erected by Charles Duncan Michener in 1949.

== Species ==
- Ptiloscola bipunctata Lemaire, 1972
- Ptiloscola burmeisteri Meister & Brechlin, 2008
- Ptiloscola cinerea (Schaus, 1900)
- Ptiloscola dargei Lemaire, 1971
- Ptiloscola descimoni Lemaire, 1971
- Ptiloscola lilacina (Schaus, 1900)
- Ptiloscola paraguayensis Brechlin, Meister & Drechsel, 2008
- Ptiloscola photophila (W. Rothschild, 1907)
- Ptiloscola rorerae (Schaus, 1928)
- Ptiloscola surrotunda (Dyar, 1925)
- Ptiloscola wellingi Lemaire, 1971
- Ptiloscola wolfei Brechlin & Meister, 2008
