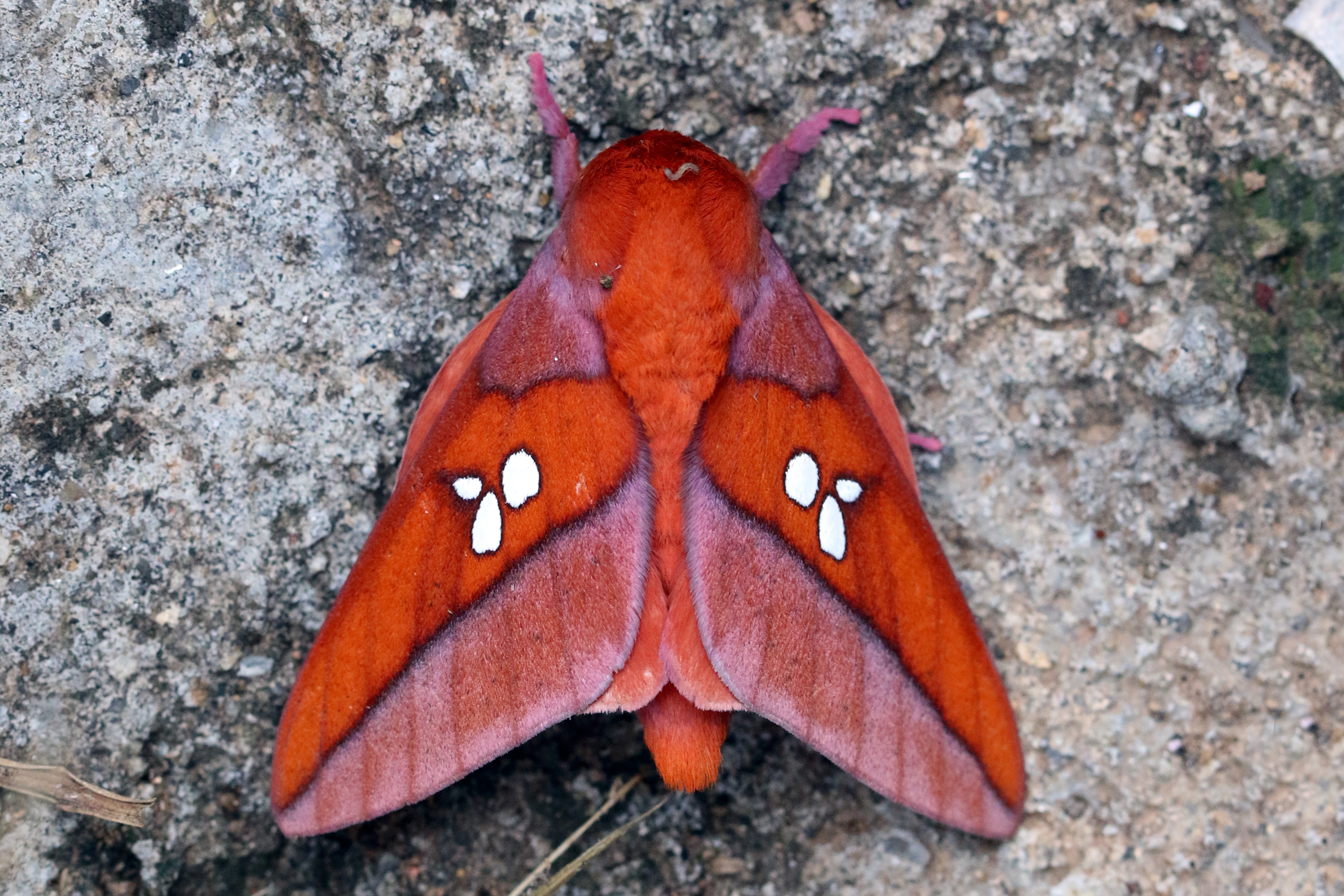
- Adelowalkeria tristygma Brazil

Scientific classification
- Domain: Eukaryota
- Kingdom: Animalia
- Phylum: Arthropoda
- Class: Insecta
- Order: Lepidoptera
- Family: Saturniidae
- Subfamily: Ceratocampinae; Harris, 1833

Genera
- See text

= Ceratocampinae =

Subfamily of moths

Ceratocampinae is a subfamily of moths in the family Saturniidae. Species can be found in the New World.

This subfamily contains the following genera:

- Adeloneivaia Travassos, 1940
- Adelowalkeria Travassos, 1941
- Almeidella Oiticica, 1946
- Anisota Hübner, 1820
- Bathyphlebia Felder, 1874
- Ceratesa Michener, 1949
- Ceropoda Michener, 1949
- Cicia Oiticica, 1964
- Citheronia Hübner, 1819
- Citheronioides Lemaire, 1988
- Citheronula Michener, 1949
- Citioica Travassos & Noronha, 1965
- Dacunju Travassos & Noronha, 1965
- Dryocampa Harris, 1833
- Eacles Hübner, 1819
- Giacomellia Bouvier, 1930
- Jaiba Lemaire, Tangerini & Mielke, 1999
- Megaceresa Michener, 1949
- Mielkesia Lemaire, 1988
- Neorcarnegia Draudt, 1930
- Oiticella Michener, 1949
- Othorene Boisduval, 1872
- Procitheronia Michener, 1949
- Psigida Oiticica, 1959
- Psilopygida Michener, 1949
- Psilopygoides Michener, 1949
- Ptiloscola Michener, 1949
- Rachesa Michener, 1949
- Schausiella Bouvier, 1930
- Scolesa Michener, 1949
- Syssphinx Hübner, 1819
