= Rachesa =

Scientific classification
- Domain: Eukaryota
- Kingdom: Animalia
- Phylum: Arthropoda
- Class: Insecta
- Order: Lepidoptera
- Family: Saturniidae
- Subfamily: Ceratocampinae
- Genus: Rachesa; Michener, 1949

Genus of moths

Rachesa is a genus of moths in the family Saturniidae first described by Charles Duncan Michener in 1949.

== Species ==
- Rachesa adusta (W. Rothschild, 1907)
- Rachesa alegrensis Brechlin & Meister, 2011
- Rachesa breteuili (Bouvier, 1927)
- Rachesa chrisbrechlinae Brechlin & Meister, 2011
- Rachesa lampei Brechlin & Meister, 2011
- Rachesa nisa (Druce, 1904)
- Rachesa reventador Lemaire, 1975
- Rachesa sinjaevorum Brechlin & Meister, 2011
- Rachesa viksinjaevi Brechlin & Meister, 2011
