= Psigida =

Scientific classification
- Domain: Eukaryota
- Kingdom: Animalia
- Phylum: Arthropoda
- Class: Insecta
- Order: Lepidoptera
- Family: Saturniidae
- Subfamily: Ceratocampinae
- Genus: Psigida; Oiticica, 1959

Genus of moths

Psigida is a genus of moths in the family Saturniidae first described by Oiticica in 1959.

== Species ==
- Psigida basalis (Michener, 1952)
- Psigida walkeri (Grote, 1867)
