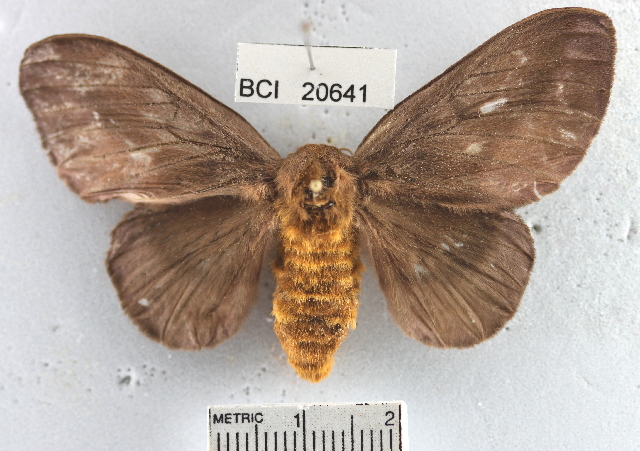

Scientific classification
- Domain: Eukaryota
- Kingdom: Animalia
- Phylum: Arthropoda
- Class: Insecta
- Order: Lepidoptera
- Family: Saturniidae
- Genus: Ptiloscola
- Species: P. dargei

Binomial name
- Ptiloscola dargei Lemaire, 1971

= Ptiloscola dargei =

Species of moth

Ptiloscola dargei is a moth of the family Saturniidae first described by Claude Lemaire in 1971. It is found in Mexico.
