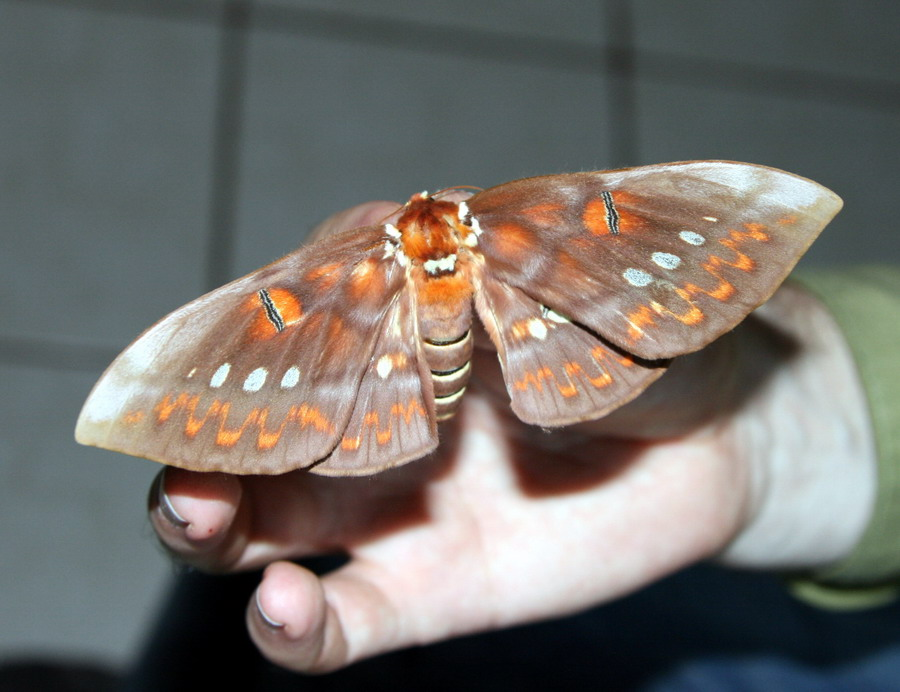
- Female Procitheronia fenestrata

Scientific classification
- Domain: Eukaryota
- Kingdom: Animalia
- Phylum: Arthropoda
- Class: Insecta
- Order: Lepidoptera
- Family: Saturniidae
- Subfamily: Ceratocampinae
- Genus: Procitheronia; Michener, 1949

= Procitheronia =

Genus of moths

Procitheronia is a genus of moths in the family Saturniidae first described by Charles Duncan Michener in 1949.

== Species ==
- Procitheronia fenestrata (W. Rothschild, 1907)
- Procitheronia principalis (Walker, 1855)
- Procitheronia purpurea (Oiticica, 1930)
