= Cicia (moth) =

Scientific classification
- Domain: Eukaryota
- Kingdom: Animalia
- Phylum: Arthropoda
- Class: Insecta
- Order: Lepidoptera
- Family: Saturniidae
- Subfamily: Ceratocampinae
- Genus: Cicia; Oiticica, 1964

Genus of moths

Cicia is a genus of moths in the family Saturniidae first described by Oiticica in 1964.

== Species ==
- Cicia citrina (Schaus, 1904)
- Cicia crocata (Boisduval, 1872)
- Cicia nettia (Schaus, 1921)
- Cicia norape Becker & Camargo, 2001
- Cicia pamala (Schaus, 1900)
- Cicia pelota (Schaus, 1905)
