= Scolesa =

Scientific classification
- Domain: Eukaryota
- Kingdom: Animalia
- Phylum: Arthropoda
- Class: Insecta
- Order: Lepidoptera
- Family: Saturniidae
- Subfamily: Ceratocampinae
- Genus: Scolesa; Michener, 1949

Genus of moths

Scolesa is a genus of moths in the family Saturniidae erected by Charles Duncan Michener in 1949.

== Species ==
- Scolesa hypoxantha (W. Rothschild, 1907)
- Scolesa leucantha (Boisduval, 1872)
- Scolesa nebulosa Lemaire, 1971
- Scolesa totoma (Schaus, 1900)
- Scolesa viettei Travassos, 1959
- Scolesa vinacea (W. Rothschild, 1907)
