= Bathyphlebia =

Scientific classification
- Domain: Eukaryota
- Kingdom: Animalia
- Phylum: Arthropoda
- Class: Insecta
- Order: Lepidoptera
- Family: Saturniidae
- Subfamily: Ceratocampinae
- Genus: Bathyphlebia; C. Felder, 1874

Genus of moths

Bathyphlebia is a genus of moths of the family Saturniidae. The genus was erected by Cajetan Felder in 1874.

== Species ==
- Bathyphlebia aglia R. Felder & Rogenhofer, 1874 — Colombia
- Bathyphlebia eminens (Dognin, 1891) — Ecuador
- Bathyphlebia eminentoides Brechlin & Meister, 2009
- Bathyphlebia johnsoni Oiticica & Michener, 1950
- Bathyphlebia rufescens Oiticica & Michener, 1950
