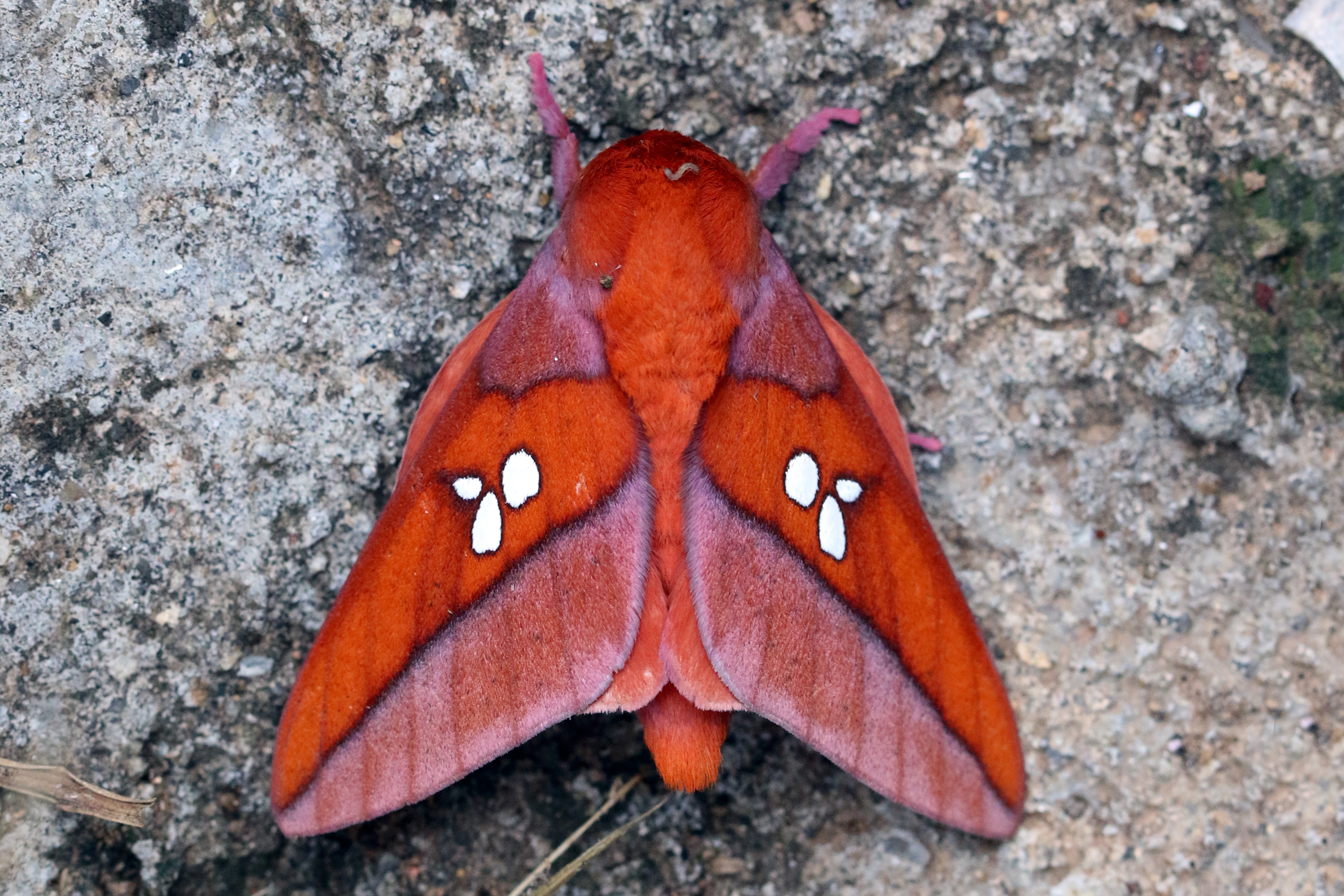
- Adelowalkeria tristygma, Brazil

Scientific classification
- Domain: Eukaryota
- Kingdom: Animalia
- Phylum: Arthropoda
- Class: Insecta
- Order: Lepidoptera
- Family: Saturniidae
- Subfamily: Ceratocampinae
- Genus: Adelowalkeria; Travassos, 1941

= Adelowalkeria =

Genus of moths

Adelowalkeria is a genus of moths in the family Saturniidae first described by Travassos in 1941.

== Species ==
- Adelowalkeria caeca Lemaire, 1969
- Adelowalkeria eugenia (Druce, 1904) — Ecuador
- Adelowalkeria flavosignata (Walker, 1865) — southern Brazil
- Adelowalkeria plateada (Schaus, 1905) — Ecuador
- Adelowalkeria torresi Travassos & May, 1941
- Adelowalkeria tristygma (Boisduval, 1872)
