= Bathyphlebia johnsoni =

Scientific classification
- Domain: Eukaryota
- Kingdom: Animalia
- Phylum: Arthropoda
- Class: Insecta
- Order: Lepidoptera
- Family: Saturniidae
- Genus: Bathyphlebia
- Species: B. johnsoni

Binomial name
- Bathyphlebia johnsoni Oiticica Filho & Michener, 1950

Species of moth

Bathyphlebia johnsoni is a moth in the family Saturniidae. It is found in Peru.

== Subspecies ==
- Bathyphlebia johnsoni johnsoni
- Bathyphlebia johnsoni flavior Oiticica Filho & Michener, 1950 (Peru)
