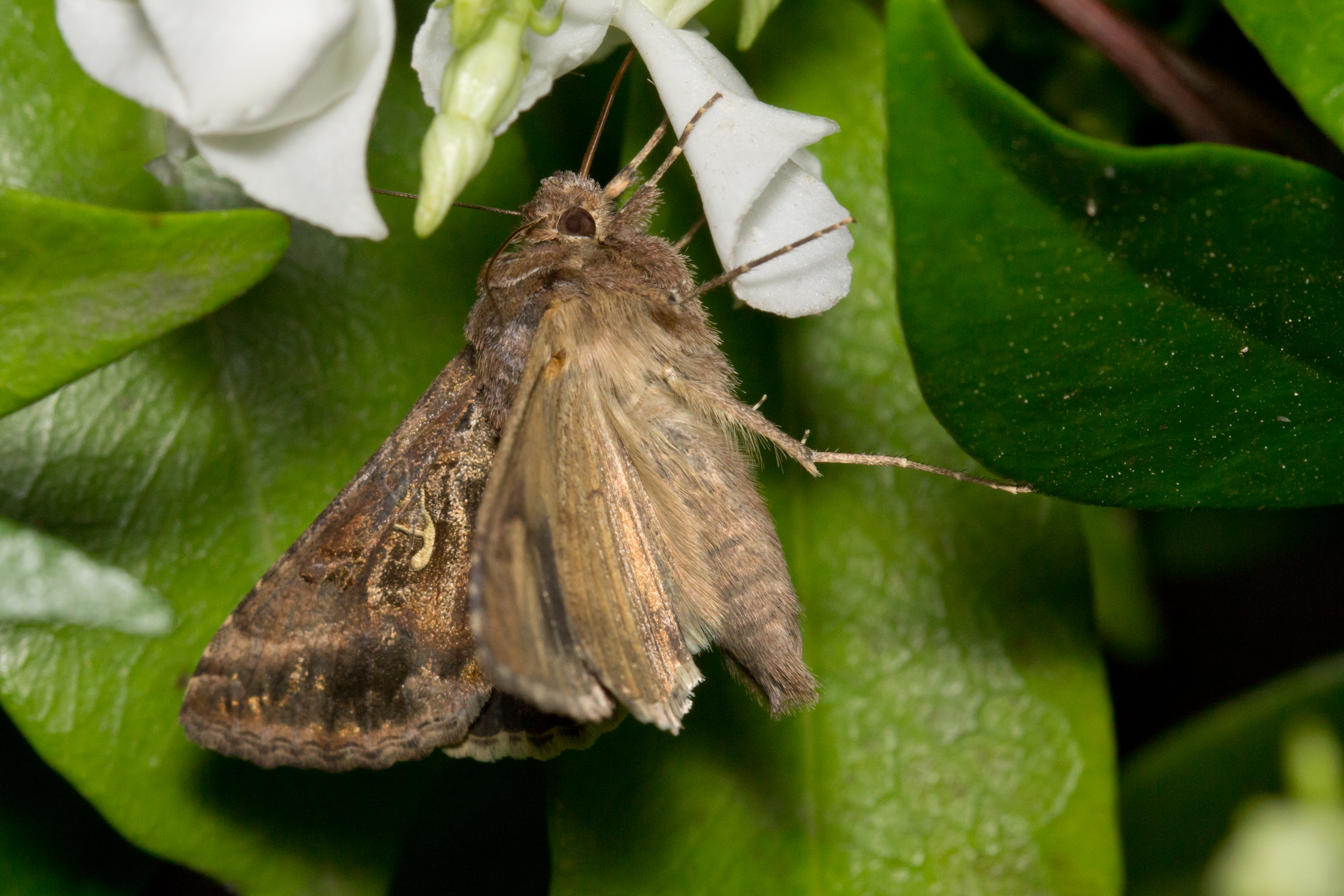
- Autographa gamma
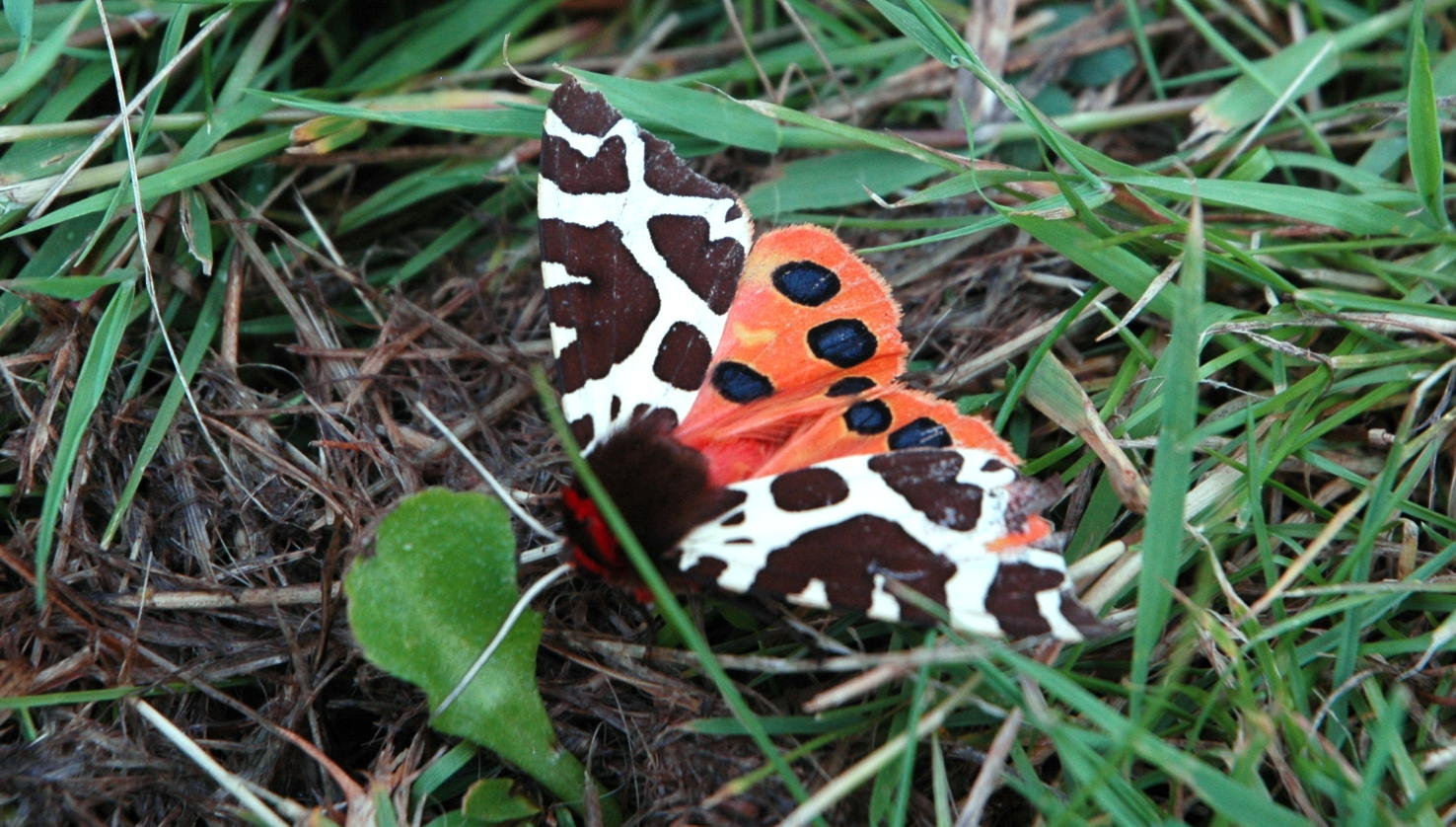
- Arctia caja

Scientific classification
- Kingdom: Animalia
- Phylum: Arthropoda
- Clade: Pancrustacea
- Class: Insecta
- Clade: Amphiesmenoptera
- Order: Lepidoptera; Latreille, 1802

Major divisions
- Aglossata; Glossata; Heterobathmiina; Zeugloptera

Synonyms
- Heterocera

= Moth =

Moths Temporal range: Early Jurassic–Present, 200–0 Ma Possible Late Triassic records

Group of mostly-nocturnal insects in the order Lepidoptera

Moths are a group of winged insects of the order Lepidoptera, the other well-known members of which are butterflies; they are characterized by dark or dull patterned wings. They were previously classified as suborder Heterocera, but the group is paraphyletic with respect to butterflies (suborder Rhopalocera) and neither subordinate taxon is used in modern classifications. Moths make up the vast majority of the order. There are approximately 160,000 species of moth, many of which have yet to be described. Most species of moth are nocturnal, although there are also crepuscular and diurnal species.

Moths have a multi-stage life cycle, and undergo complete metamorphosis. Winged adults generally lay eggs on or near plant foliage on which their larvae, known as caterpillars, will feed. Although most feed on plant matter, some species such as Eupithecia orichloris are carnivorous insectivores. The caterpillars grow, sometimes very rapidly, and when fully developed will pupate, often after constructing a cocoon from silk. When metamorphosis is complete, the pupal skin splits, the adult insect climbs out and slowly expands its wings to dry and harden, before flying off.

Moths are commonly thought to eat clothes and fabrics, however it is only their larvae, caterpillars, which may consume natural fibres.

Moths are very widely distributed across diverse terrestrial habitats and are found on all continents except Antarctica.

== Etymology ==
The modern English word moth comes from Old English moððe (cf. Northumbrian mohðe) from Common Germanic (compare Old Norse motti, Dutch mot, and German Motte all meaning 'moth'). Its origins are possibly related to the Old English maða meaning 'maggot' or from the root of midge which until the 16th century was used mostly to indicate the larva, usually in reference to devouring clothes.

== Life cycle and description ==
Being oviparous, moth larvae hatch as eggs. Female moths will usually nurture the eggs with a layer of nutrients, sometimes providing a protective chemical layer, or covering with urticating hairs (such as in Lymantriinae). Eggs vary in shape and size, some being very elongated, and in colour, some being well camouflaged, others being brightly coloured to indicate a chemical defence (aposematism).

=== Caterpillar ===
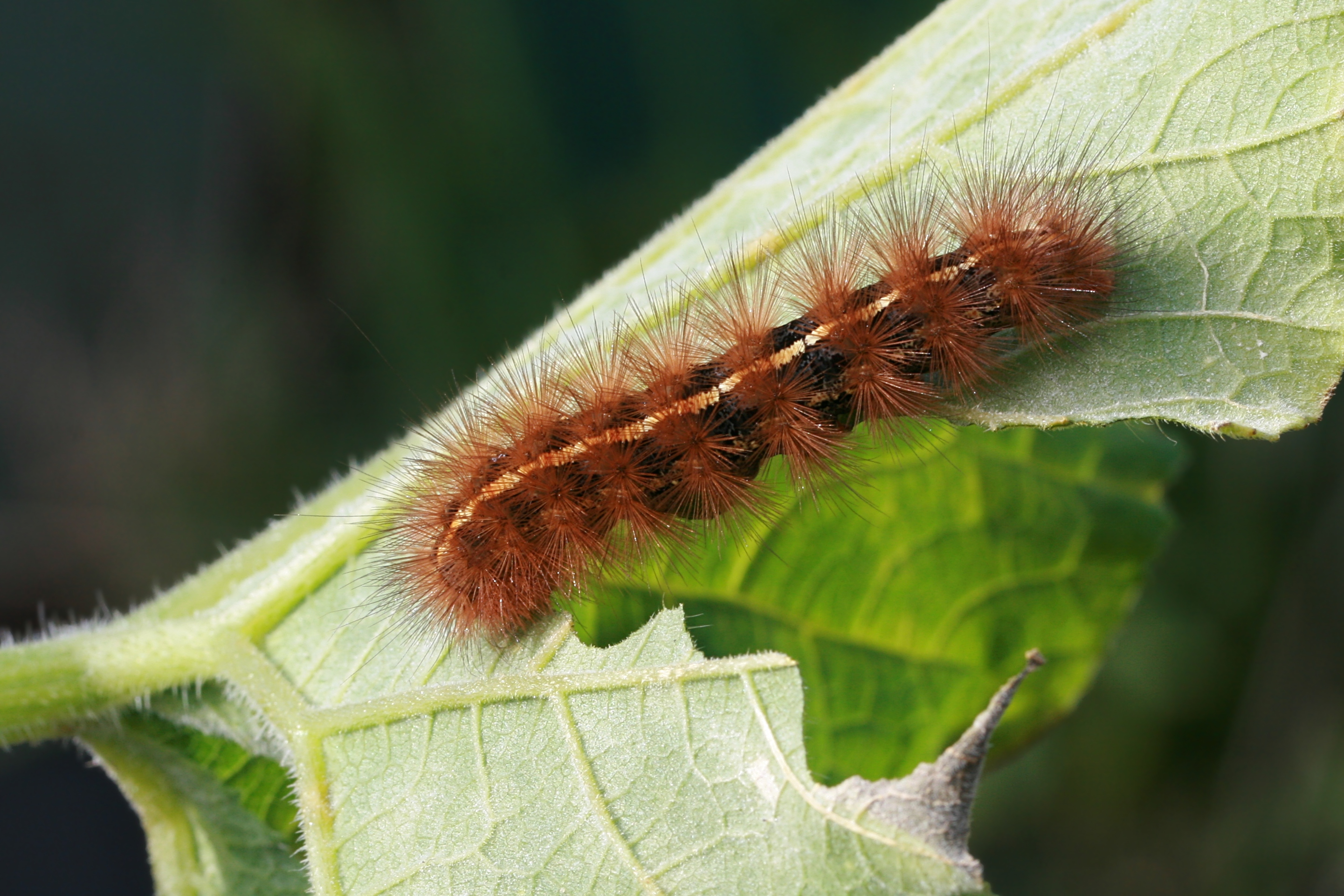
Ardices canescens, eating a leaf

Moth larvae, or caterpillars, are the first life stage after emergence from the egg. During emergence from the egg larva will consume the egg shell. Larvae have sclerotized heads, and mouthparts adapted for chewing. They have very short antennae and stemmata, mainly used for food detection. They possess a spinneret for producing silk. The larval stage varies in duration depending on temperature and food availability, but usually takes from four to eight weeks, sometimes as short as two weeks. Species which enter diapause during the winter may take up to 10 months, some species may take years. Larvae have three pairs of thoracic legs, and multiple proleg with gripping hooks called crochets, and will walk in order to reach a suitable spot for pupation, and to reach food.

The larval stage is the main feeding stage, where the larva will in most species consume plant matter.

At the end of their life stage, caterpillars will seek out a location to enter the pupal stage. Usually this will be underground, or beneath plant debris. Most species are quite specific around where they will choose to pupate. Some species will pupate without constructing a cocoon, others will construct a cocoon from silk, often also incorporating plant debris, such as Cerura vinula which may incorporate pieces of chewed bark into the silk cocoon.

=== Pupa ===
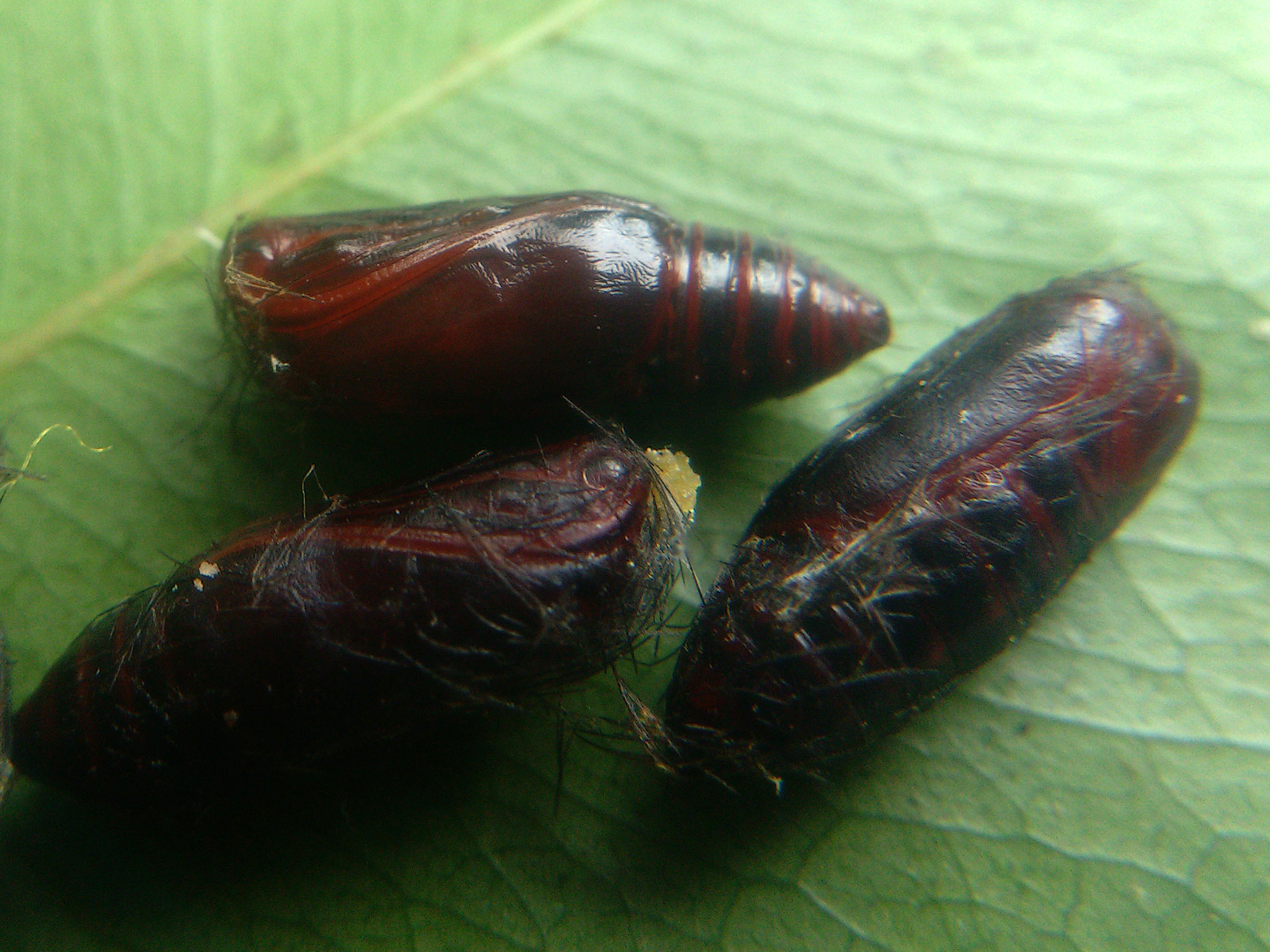
Curoba sangarida pupa

During the pupal stage, the pupa will undergo metamorphosis and will be immobile for the duration of the life stage. The outer shell of the Pupa is sclerotised, and usually shiny and smooth.

At the end of this life stage the adult usually emerges from the pupa at a specific time of day, often late afternoon in night flying moths and early morning in day flying moths. To break free from the cocoon some species may secrete potassium hydroxide from their mouth to weaken the silk.

=== Adult ===
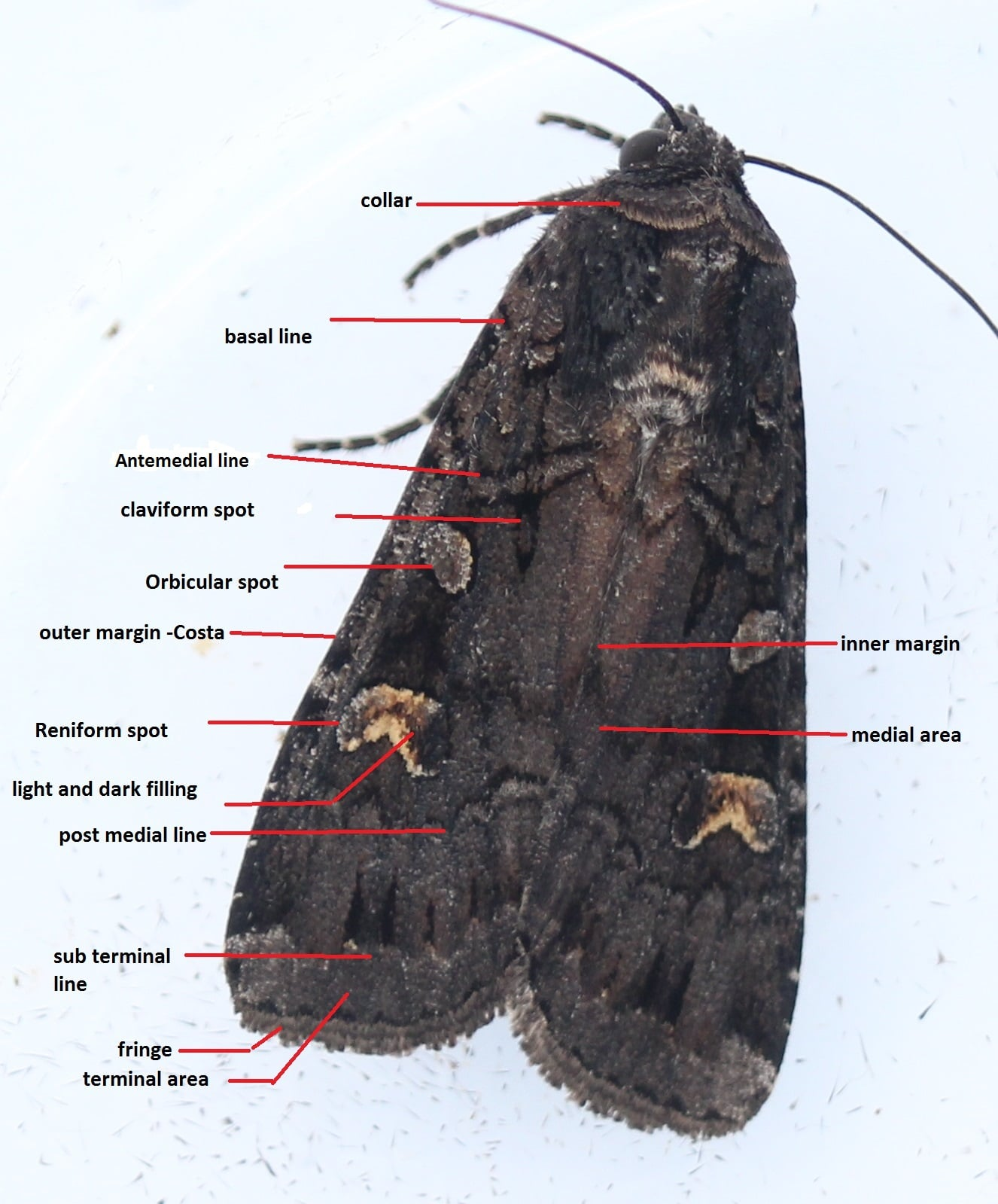
Illustration of identifying features, using entomology terms

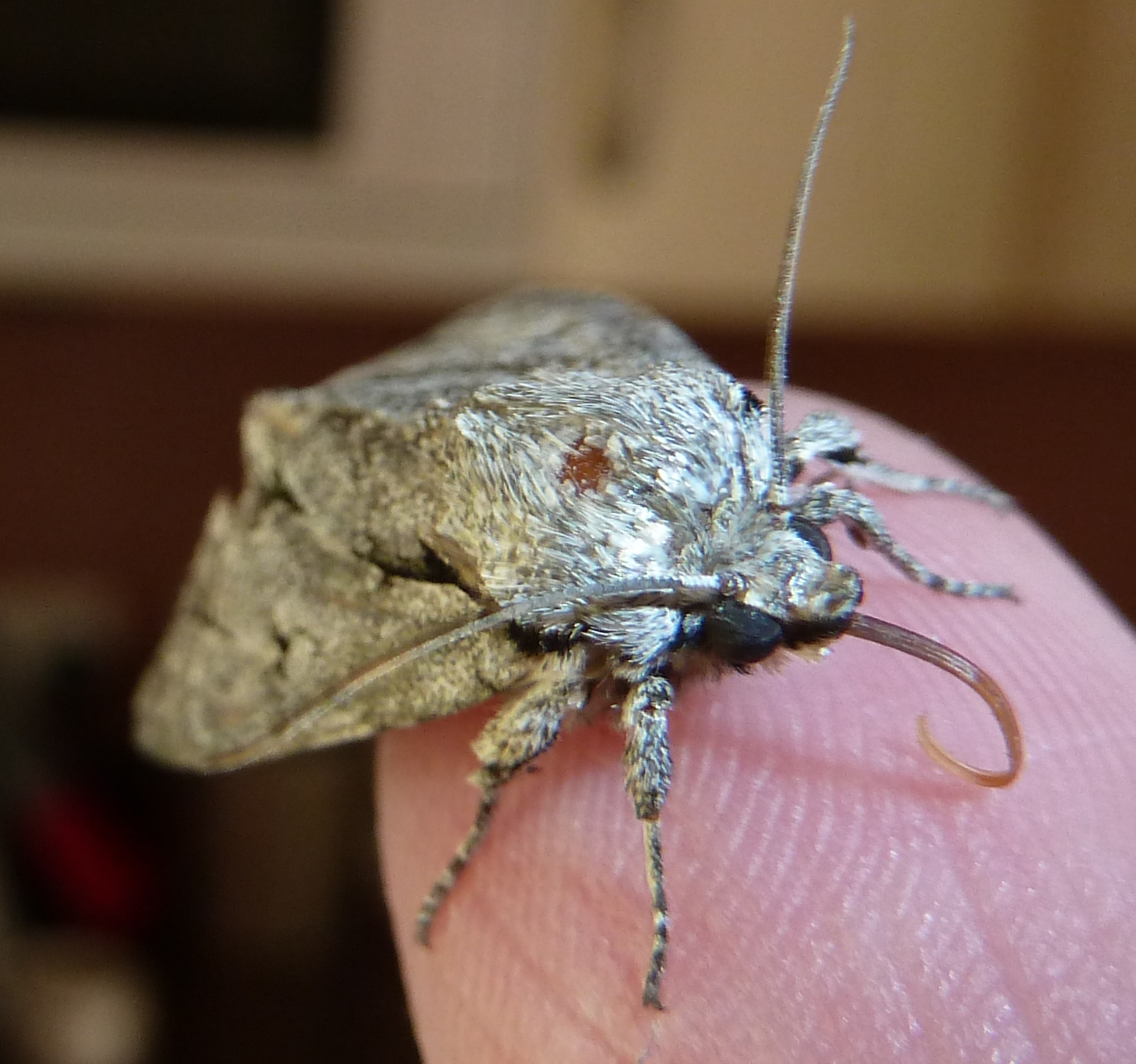
Grey dagger, extruding proboscis from mouth

The adult stage of the moth is primarily for reproduction and for dispersing from the location of pupation. An emerged moth will spend a few hours opening its wings for the first time, allowing them to dry and harden. Usually emergence is specific to a certain time of the day: night flying moths emerge in late afternoon, and day flying moths emerge in early morning. Moth wings are made of small overlapping scales. While providing insulation, the scales are also responsible for enabling the varied patterns seen on moths, each scale having a different pigment to make up the overall visible pattern. Moth scales can vary greatly in shape between families, from Filamentous and hairlike to club or paddle shaped.

Almost all adult moths have a distinct coiled proboscis used to pull in fluids such as plant sap or water, and in many species is used to feed on flower nectar. Adult moths have two large compound eyes, which can each range from 200 to 27,000 facets. Most adult moths also possess ocelli, above their compound eyes; likely for orientation purposes. Moths have two sensory antennae, which take a branch like shape and have no bulge on the end but taper to a point.

Moths are able to produce sound for communication in a variety of ways, some species possessing tymbal organs, for the purpose of warning others to the presence of predators such as bats. Moths possess excellent hearing, from organs usually located on their abdomen, and can detect the sound of bats' wings.

Moths use their dark and varied colouration which may resemble bark, stones, or dead leaves, for camouflage, avoiding the detection of predators. This is often in contrast to the caterpillar stage, which are often green to resemble the leaves which they must feed from.

Females utilise pheromones to attract males of same species, remaining stationary while males locate them. Due to sensitive antennae, male moths have a highly acute capacity to detect scent and can reliably track a female who is releasing pheromones up to a kilometre away. Since moths are usually quite dispersed, scent is more reliable a means of mate attraction than sound as is seen in many other insects.

Some of the largest known moths can be found in the family Saturniidae, among which Attacus atlas of Southeast Asia attains a wingspan of up to 300 mm. The smallest moths have wing-spans as small as 2.5 mm, such as Nepticulidae. The average among all moths is around 25 mm.

=== Behaviour ===
Many moths use the Earth's magnetic field to navigate. The silver Y can correct its course with changing winds, even at high altitude, and prefers flying with favourable winds. Aphrissa statira in Panama loses its navigational capacity when exposed to a magnetic field, suggesting it uses the Earth's magnetic field.

Most Lepidopterans that migrate are butterflies, and the distance travelled varies. Moths such as the uraniids migrate. Urania fulgens undergoes population explosions and massive migrations that may be not surpassed by any other insect in the Neotropics. In Costa Rica and Panama, the first population movements may begin in July and early August and depending on the year, may be very massive, continuing unabated for as long as five months.

Pheromones are involved in mating rituals among species, especially moths, but they are also an important aspect of other forms of communication. Usually, the pheromones are produced by one sex and detected by members of the opposite sex with their antennae. In many species, a gland between the eighth and ninth segments under the abdomen in the female produces the pheromones. Communication can also occur through stridulation, or producing sounds by rubbing parts of the body together. They pick up these sounds using tympanic membranes in the abdomen. An example is that of the polka-dot wasp moth (Syntomeida epilais), which produces sounds with a frequency above that normally detectable by humans (about 20 kHz). These sounds also function as tactile communication, or communication through touch, as they stridulate, or vibrate a substrate like leaves and stems.

=== Attraction to light ===
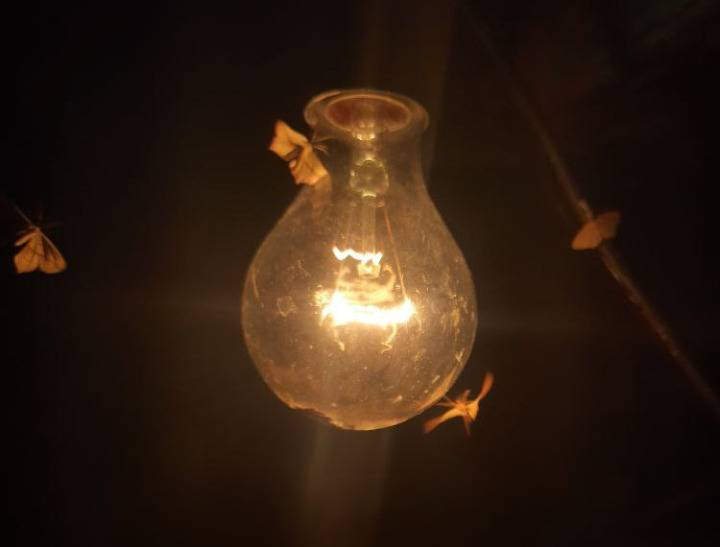
Moths circling an electric light bulb

Moths frequently appear to circle artificial lights. The reason for this behaviour (positive phototaxis) has not been solved, however there is widespread speculation that it is a result of orienting instincts, which in the natural environment of night flying moths would cause them to fly upward towards the moon, and may be a part of dispersal behaviour.

One hypothesis is called celestial or transverse orientation. By maintaining a constant angular relationship to a bright celestial light, such as the moon, they can fly in a straight line. Celestial objects are so far away that, even after travelling great distances, the change in angle between the moth and the light source is negligible; further, the moon will always be in the upper part of the visual field, or on the horizon. When a moth encounters a much closer artificial light and uses it for navigation, the angle changes noticeably after only a short distance, in addition to being often below the horizon. The moth instinctively attempts to correct by turning toward the light, thereby causing airborne moths to come plummeting downward, and resulting in a spiral flight path that gets closer and closer to the light source.

Studies have found that light pollution caused by increasing use of artificial lights has either led to a severe decline in moth population in some parts of the world or has severely disrupted nocturnal pollination.

=== Differences between butterflies and moths ===
While the butterflies form a monophyletic group, the moths, comprising the rest of the Lepidoptera, do not. Many attempts have been made to group the superfamilies of the Lepidoptera into natural groups, most of which fail because one of the two groups is not monophyletic: Microlepidoptera and Macrolepidoptera, Heterocera and Rhopalocera, Jugatae and Frenatae, Monotrysia, and Ditrysia.

Although the rules for distinguishing moths from butterflies are not well established, one very good guiding principle is that butterflies have thin antennae and (with the exception of the family Hedylidae) have small balls or clubs at the end of their antennae. Moth antennae are usually feathery with no ball on the end. The divisions are named by this principle: "club-antennae" (Rhopalocera) or "varied-antennae" (Heterocera). Lepidoptera first evolved during the Carboniferous period, but only evolved their characteristic proboscis alongside the rise of angiosperms in the Cretaceous period.

Moths also tend to have far more hair-like scales than butterflies.

Moths are usually nocturnal flyers in contrast to butterflies which fly by day, however there are many exceptions such as the Cinnabar moth.

== Evolutionary history ==
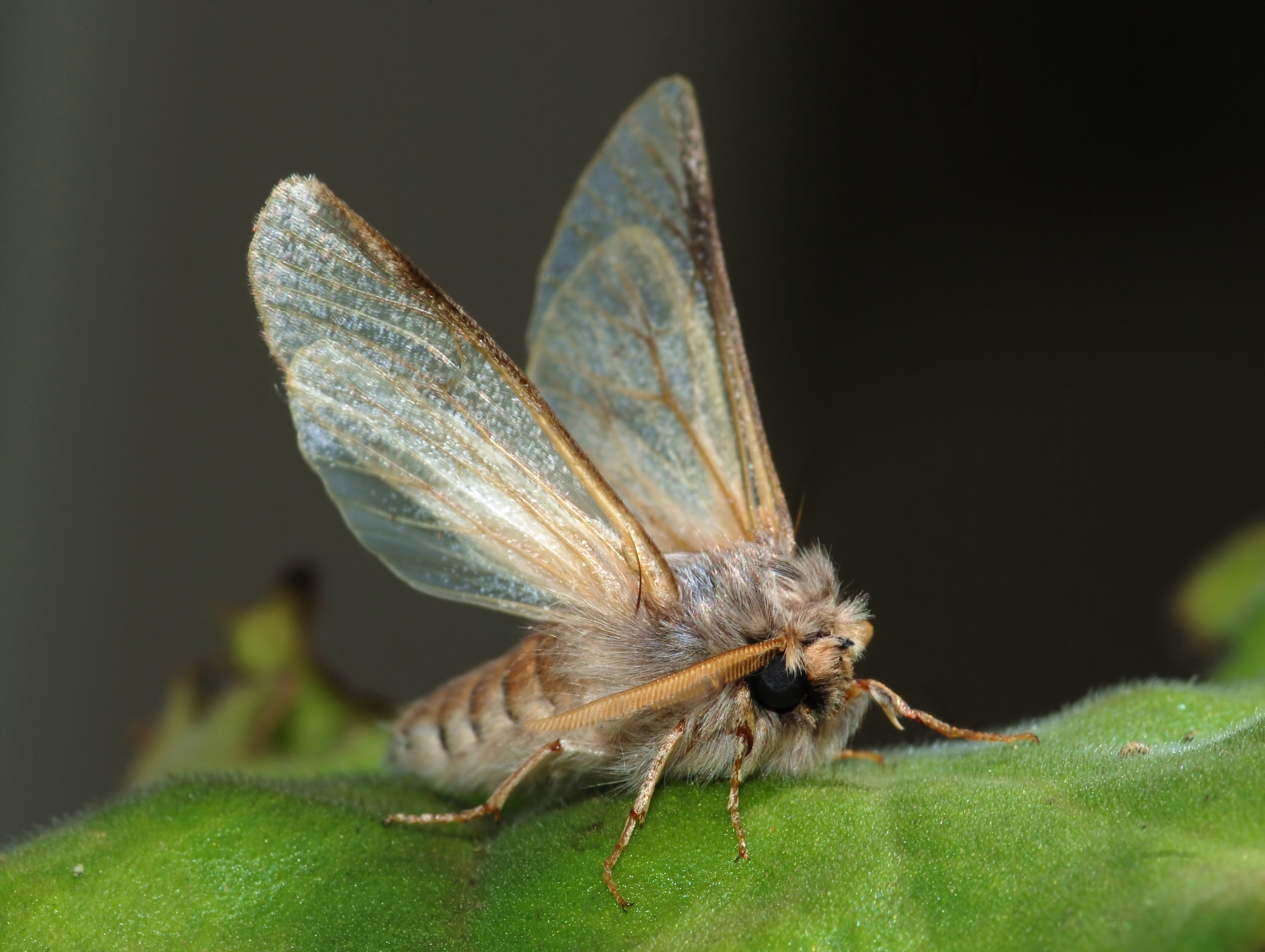
Thaumetopoea pityocampa. Notice the bristle springing from the underside of the hindwing (frenulum) and running forward to be held in a small catch of the forewing, whose function is to link the wings together.

Moths evolved long before butterflies; moth fossils have been found that may be 190 million years old. Both types of Lepidoptera are speculated to have co-evolved with flowering plants, mainly because most modern species, both as adults and larvae, feed on flowering plants. One of the earliest known species that is thought to be an ancestor of moths is Archaeolepis mane. Its fossil fragments show scaled wings that are similar to caddisflies in their veining.

The earliest fossil record of scales indicative of the Lepidoptera order were found in Triassic and Triassic-Jurassic boundary sediments from Northern Germany, which has put into some doubt the association of early moths with flowering plants. Jurassic fossils have been found in England, Germany, and Kazakhstan.

=== Industrial melanism in modern moths ===
A phenomenon associated with human industrialisation has been observed in species such as the peppered moth, in which the occurrence of individuals which are darker than the typical form have increased in number. Increases of melanism in moths was first observed in the mid nineteenth century in Britain, and was associated with industrialized areas of the country where tree trunks were blackened with soot from coal burning. The phenomenon has been widely described as a classical example of natural selection, in which the darker moths gained better camouflage against the blackened tree bark, and therefore had a higher rate of survival and subsequently reproductive success.

=== Taxonomy ===
Among the Lepidoptera, moths comprise about 90% (remaining 10% being butterflies). There are around 160,000 described species. There is estimated to be tens of thousands of unidentified species, especially from tropical regions. The name Heterocera is no longer used in modern classification, however the name is often used to refer to moths; as Rhopalocera is like-wise used as the name for butterflies.

Among the 133 known families (43 superfamilies), moths make up 126 of the Lepidoptera families, comprising all but the seven butterfly families.

While there are 157,424 extant species described currently, the total number is estimated to be around 500,000. On average, over 1,000 species of Lepidoptera is described annually in recent years.

Some of the largest moth families include Erebidae, Noctuidae, Geometroidea, and Pyralidae.

== Ecology ==
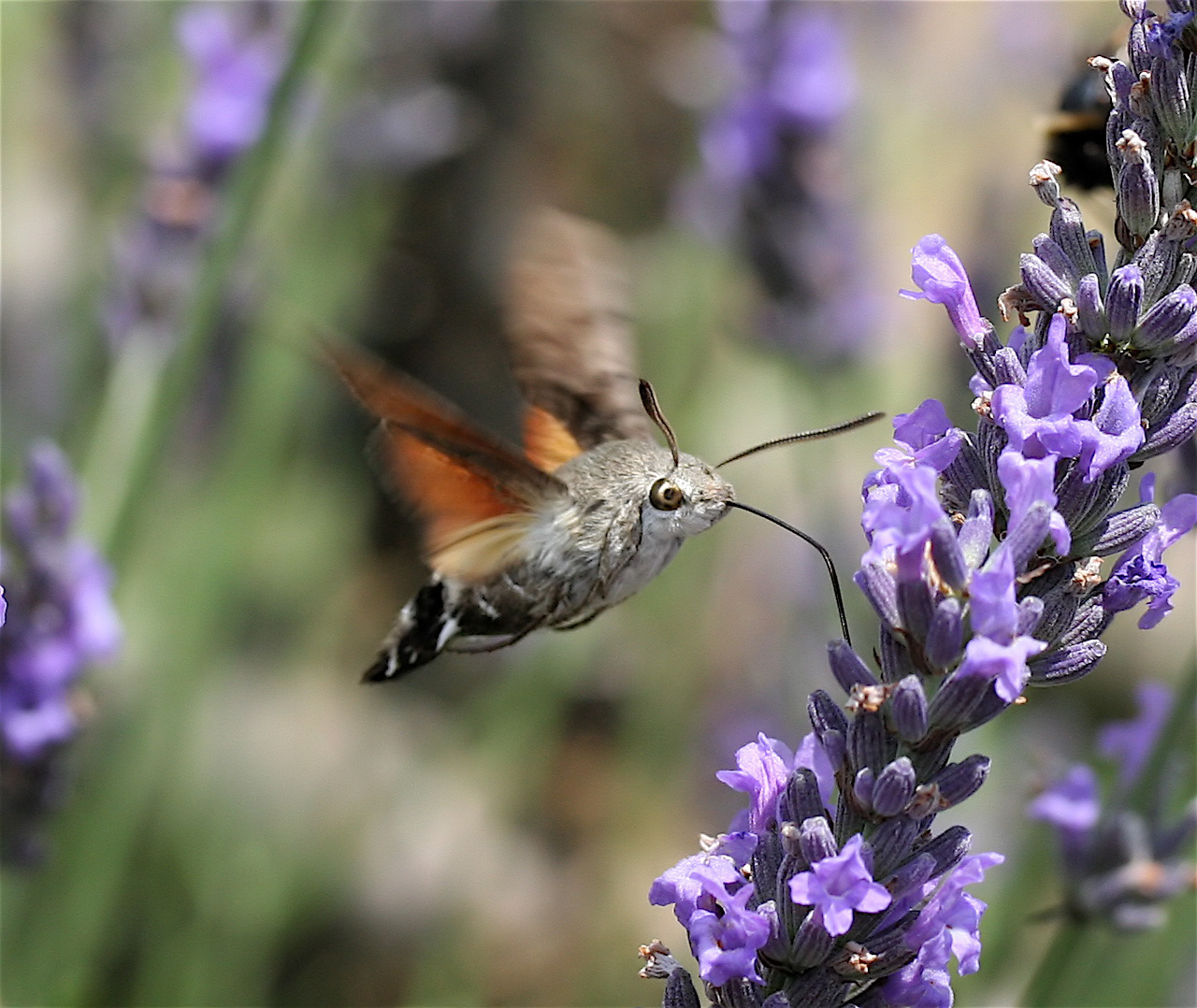
A hummingbird hawk-moth feeding on flower nectar with its proboscis

Moths, like butterflies, bees and other more popularly recognised pollinating insects, serve an essential role as pollinators for many flowering plants, including species that bees do not visit. Nocturnal moths fly from flower to flower to feed on nectar during the night much as their diurnal relatives do during the day. A study conducted in the UK found moths dusted with pollen from 47 different plant species, including seven species largely ignored by bees. Some studies indicate that certain species of moths, such as those belonging to the families Erebidae and Sphingidae, may be the key pollinators for some flowering plants in the Himalayan ecosystem. The roles of moths as pollinators have been studied less frequently than those of diurnal pollinators, but recent studies have established that moths are important, but often overlooked, nocturnal pollinators of a wide range of plants. Some researchers say it is likely that many plants thought to be dependent on bees for pollination also rely on moths, which have historically been less observed because they pollinate mainly at night.

Both as caterpillars and adult, moths are a substantial part of the insect biomass available to insectivorous vertebrates, they are also an important dietary source for many bats and passerines.

=== Predators and parasites ===
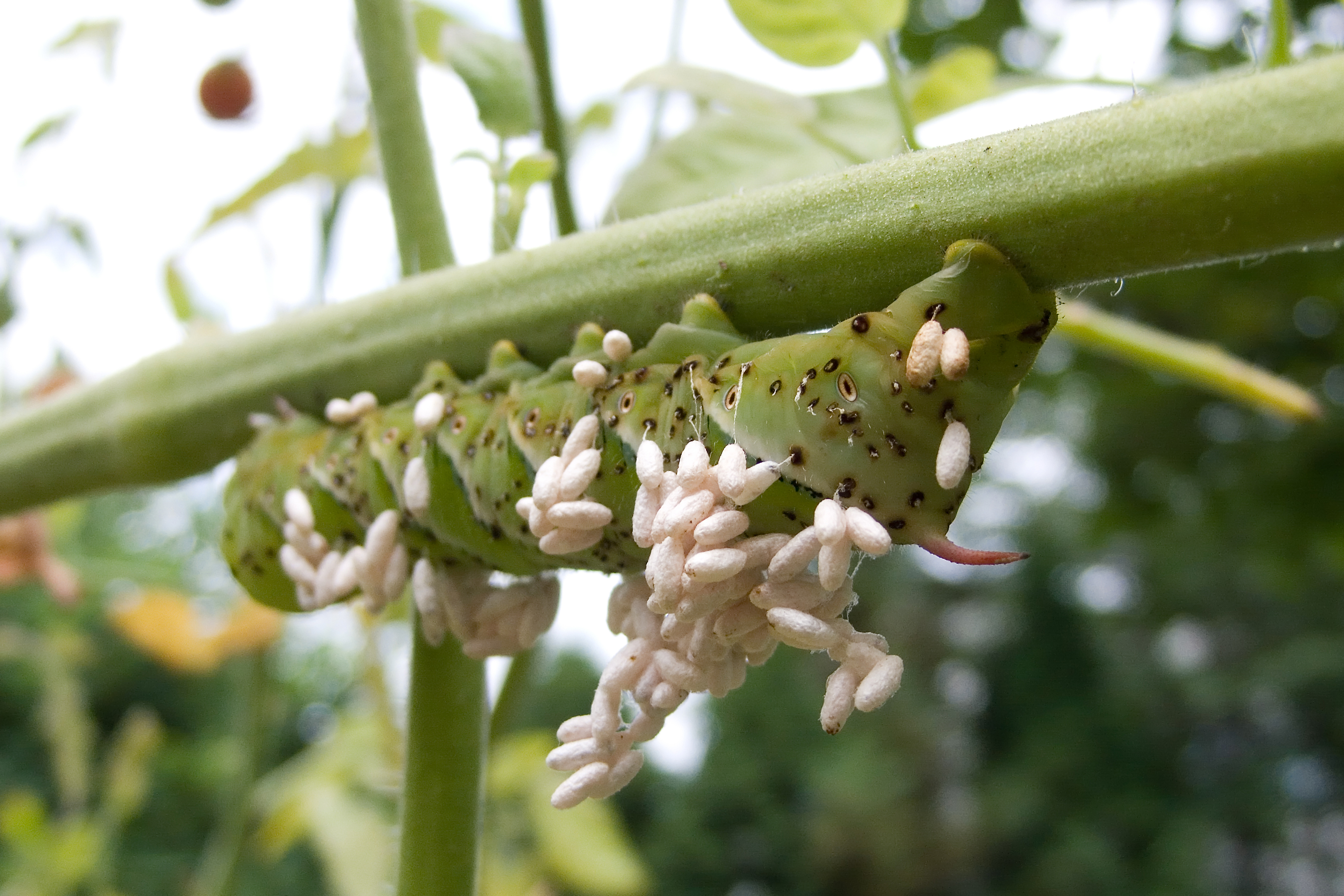
Manduca sexta parasitised by braconid wasps

Nocturnal insectivores often feed on moths; these include some bats, some species of owls and other species of birds. Moths also are eaten by some species of lizards, amphibians, cats, dogs, rodents, and some bears. Moth larvae are vulnerable to being parasitised by Ichneumonidae.

Baculoviruses are parasite double-stranded DNA insect viruses that are used mostly as biological control agents. They are members of the Baculoviridae, a family that is restricted to insects. Most baculovirus isolates have been obtained from insects, in particular from Lepidoptera.

There is evidence that ultrasound in the range emitted by bats causes flying moths to make evasive manoeuvrers. Ultrasonic frequencies trigger a reflex action in the noctuid moth that causes it to drop a few centimetres or inches in its flight to evade attack, and tiger moths can emit clicks to foil bats' echolocation.

The fungus Ophiocordyceps sinensis infects the larvae of many different species of moths.

== Relationship to humans ==
Moth traps are often used by amateur collectors, entomologists, or in pest control, to capture moths.

=== As pests ===
Some moths, particularly their caterpillars, can be major agricultural pests in many parts of the world. Examples include corn borers and bollworms. The caterpillar of the spongy moth (Lymantria dispar) causes severe damage to forests in the northeastern United States, where it is an invasive species. In temperate climates, the codling moth causes extensive damage, especially to fruit farms. In tropical and subtropical climates, the diamondback moth (Plutella xylostella) is perhaps the most serious pest of brassicaceous crops. Also in sub-Saharan Africa, the African sugarcane borer is a major pest of sugarcane, maize, and sorghum.

Several moths in the family Tineidae are commonly regarded as pests because their larvae eat fabric such as clothes and blankets made from natural proteinaceous fibers such as wool or silk. They are less likely to eat mixed materials containing some artificial fibers. There are some reports that they may be repelled by the scent of wood from juniper and cedar, by lavender, or by other natural oils; however, many consider this unlikely to prevent infestation. Naphthalene (the chemical used in mothballs) is considered more effective, but there are concerns over its effects on human health.

Despite being commonly thought to be undertaken by all moths, only the larvae of several moth species eat animal fibres, creating holes in articles of clothing, in particular those made of wool. Most species do not eat fabrics, and some moth adults do not even eat at all. Some, like the Luna, Polyphemus, Atlas, Promethea, cecropia, and other large moths do not have mouth parts. This is possible because they live off the food stores from when they were a caterpillar, and only live a short time as an adult (roughly a week for some species). Many species of adult moths do however eat: for instance, many will drink nectar.

Items of fabric infested by clothes moth larvae may be treated by freezing them for several days at a temperature below −8 °C (18 °F).

=== Sericulture ===
A Japanese 19th century woodcut, showing sericulture

Some moths are farmed for their economic value in an agricultural practice called sericulture. Sericulture is one of the oldest agricultural practices in humans, and uses silk producing moth species to farm silk. The most notable of these is the silkworm, the larva of the domesticated moth Bombyx mori. It is farmed for the silk with which it builds its cocoon. The cocoons are bathed in hot water to separate the strands, which also kills the pupae. As of 2002, the silk industry produces more than 130 million kilograms of raw silk, worth about 250 million U.S. dollars, each year.

Not all silk is produced by Bombyx mori. There are several species of Saturniidae that also are farmed for their silk, such as the ailanthus moth (Samia cynthia group of species), the Chinese oak silkmoth (Antheraea pernyi), the Assam silkmoth (Antheraea assamensis), and the Japanese silk moth (Antheraea yamamai).

Genetic modification of silk producing species to increase yields and improve disease and environmental resistance of the larvae has been widely employed in modern sericulture.

=== Food ===
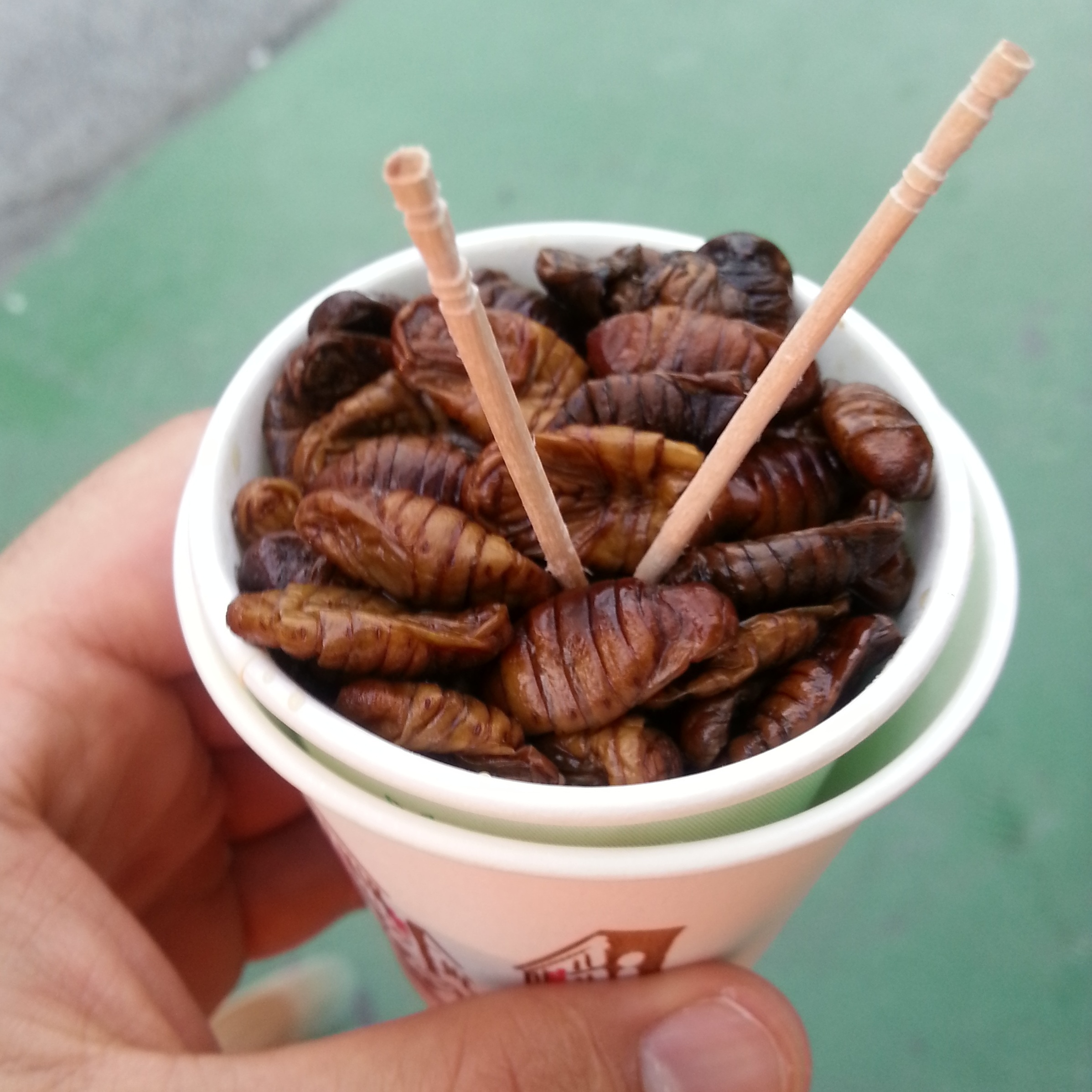
Beondegi

The larvae of many species are used as food, particularly in Africa, where they are an important source of nutrition. The mopane worm, the caterpillar of Gonimbrasia belina, from the family Saturniidae, is a significant food resource in southern Africa. Another saturniid used as food is the cavorting emperor (Usta terpsichore). In one country alone, Congo, more than 30 species of moth larvae are harvested. Some are sold not only in the local village markets, but are shipped by the ton from one country to another.

As a by-product of the silk farming of Bombyx mori, a large amount of pupae is produced, and has historically been consumed by people in silk-producing areas. Since the end of the Korean War, Bombyx mori pupae has been popularly consumed as a street food across South Korea.

== Gallery ==
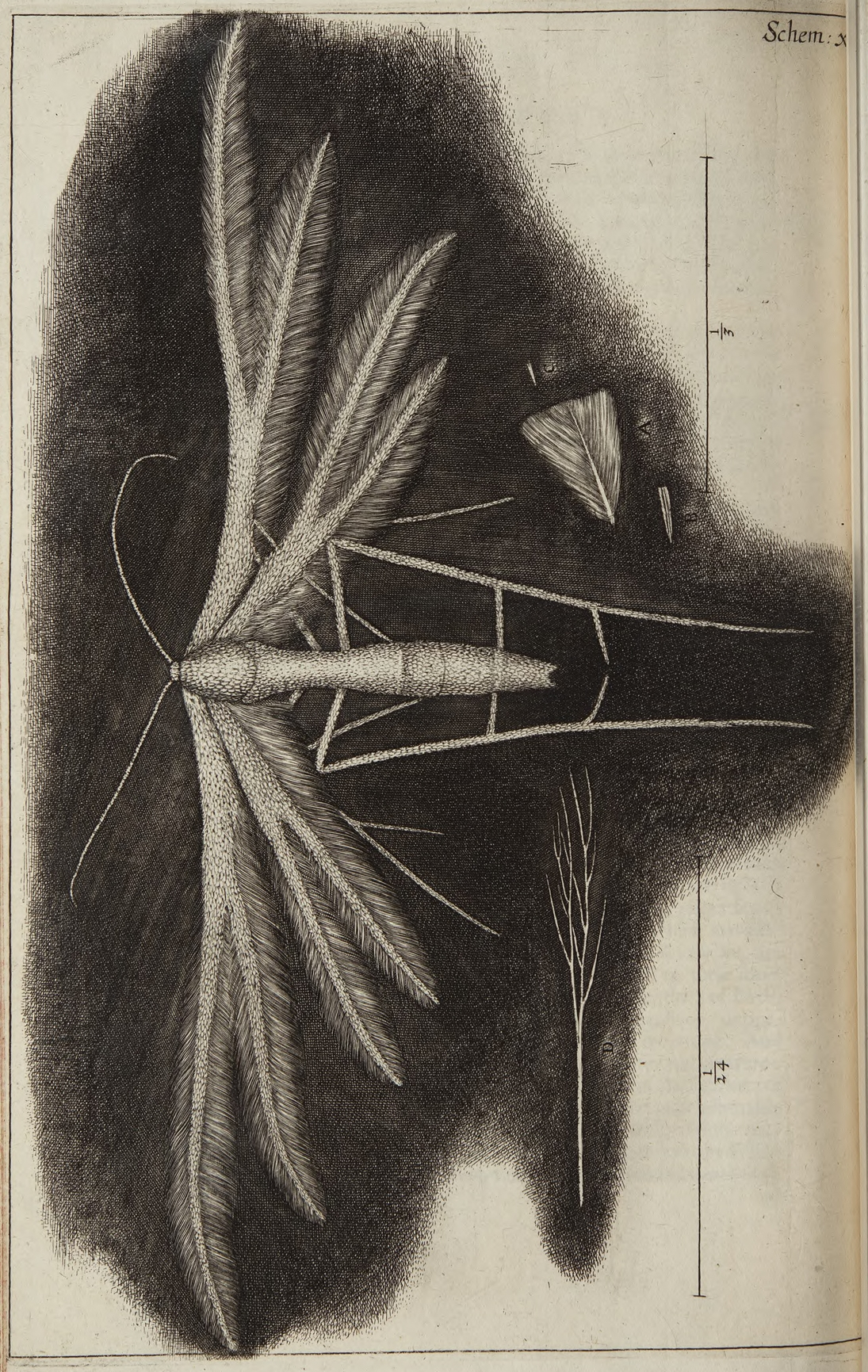
Diagram of a plume moth from Robert Hooke's Micrographia

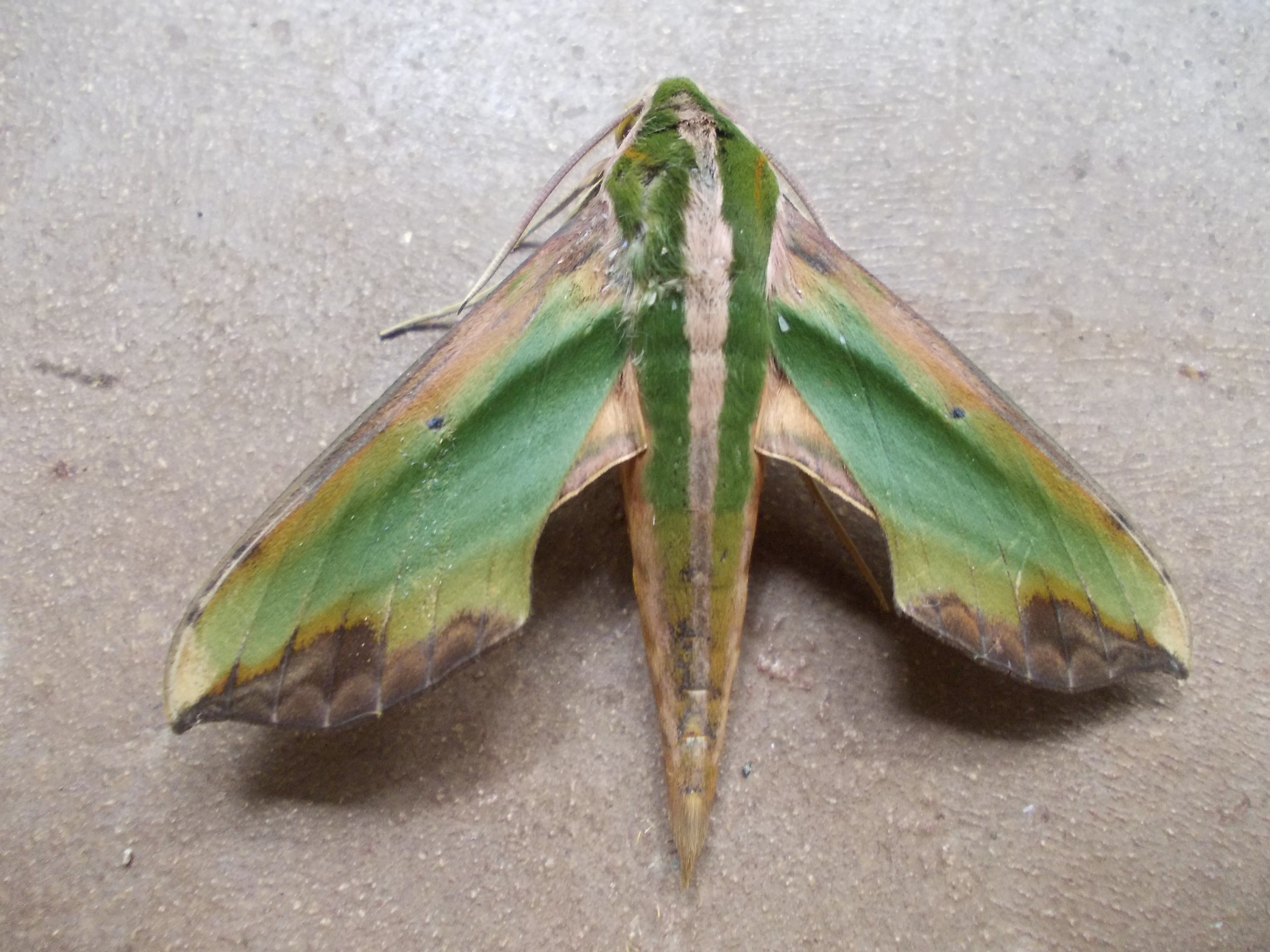
Leaf-shaped moth (Pergesa acteus)

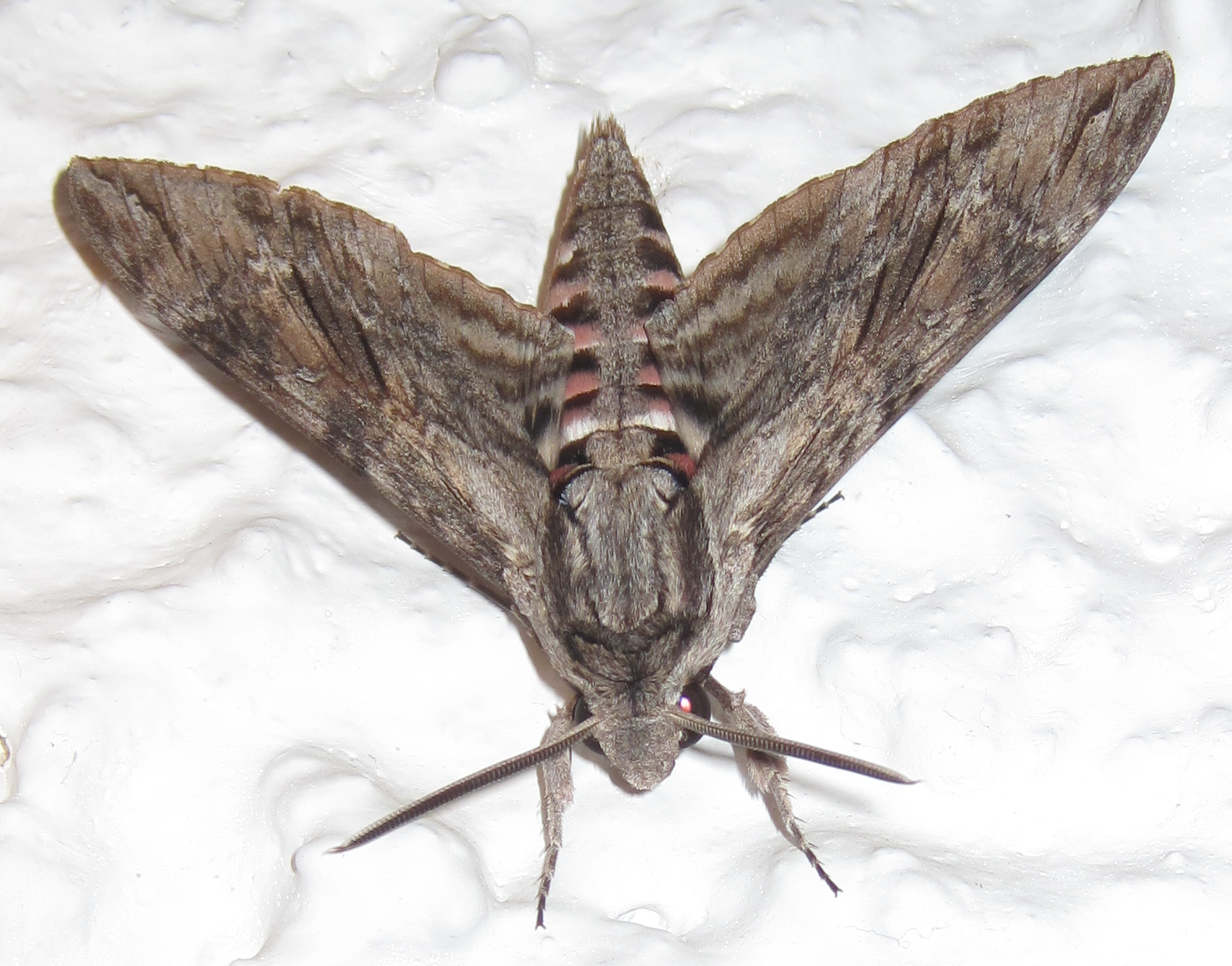
Giant grey moth (Agrius convolvuli)

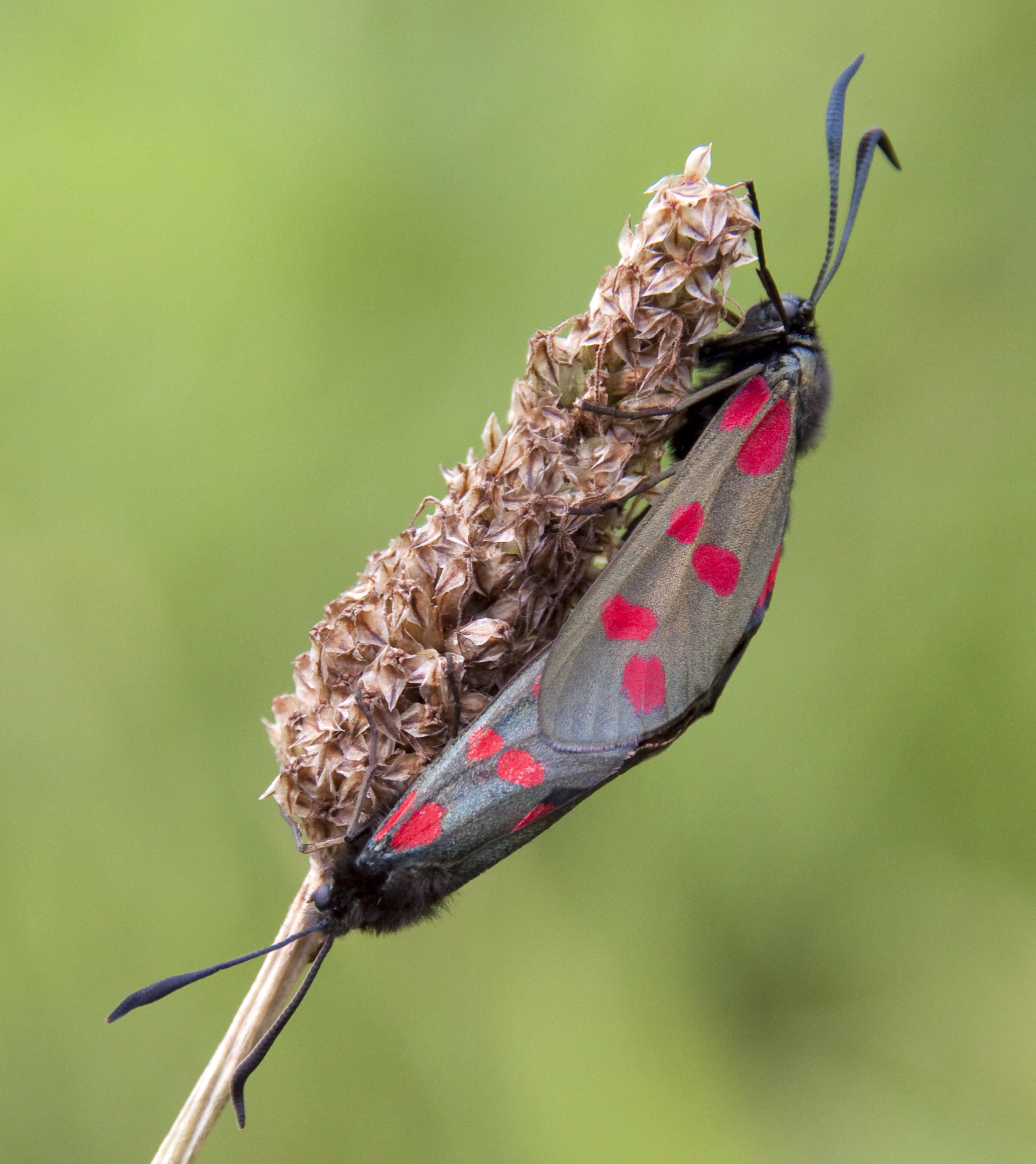
Six-spot burnet moths mating (Zygaena filipendulae)

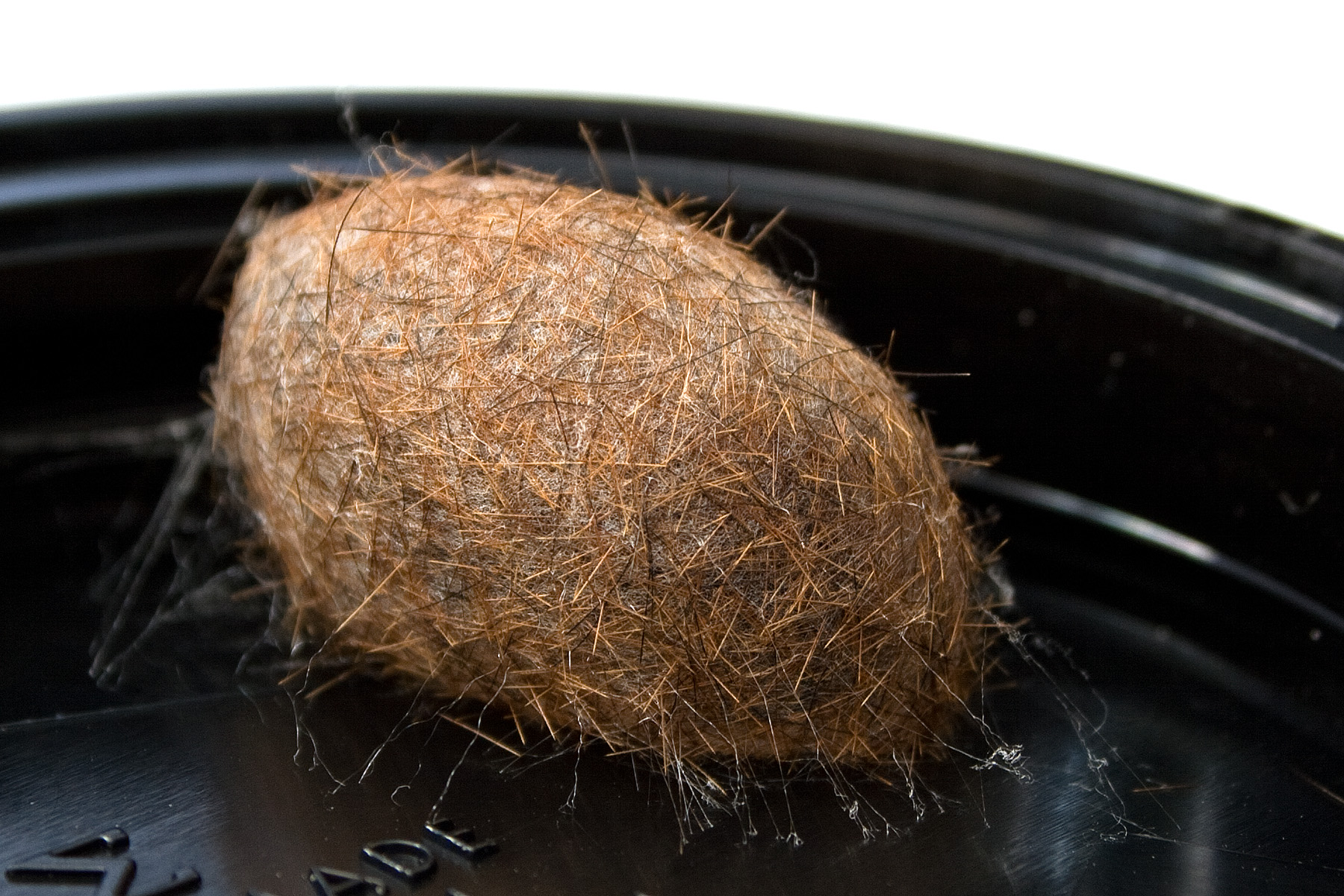
Protective silk (or similar material) case (cocoon)

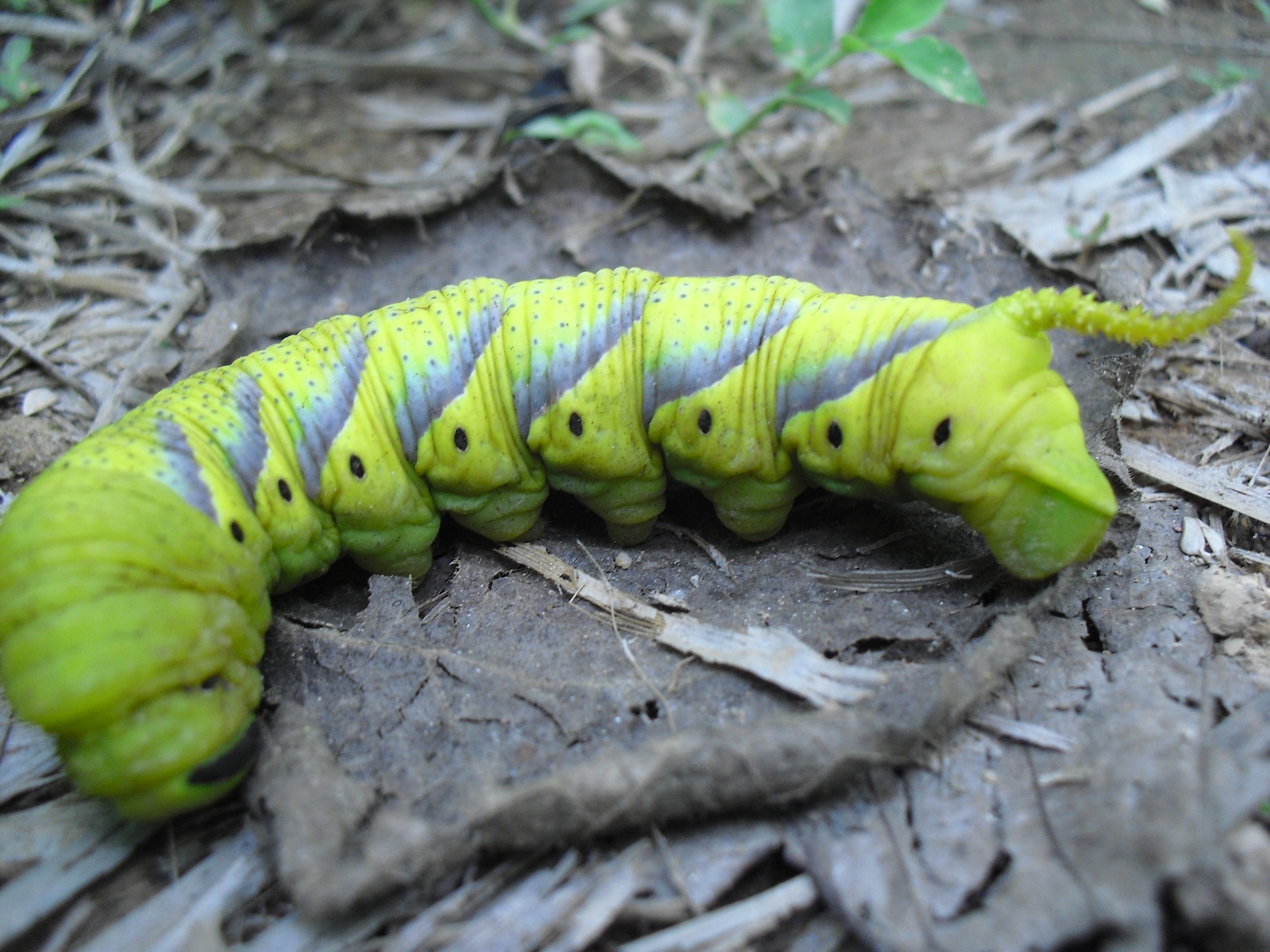
A caterpillar of death's-head hawkmoth

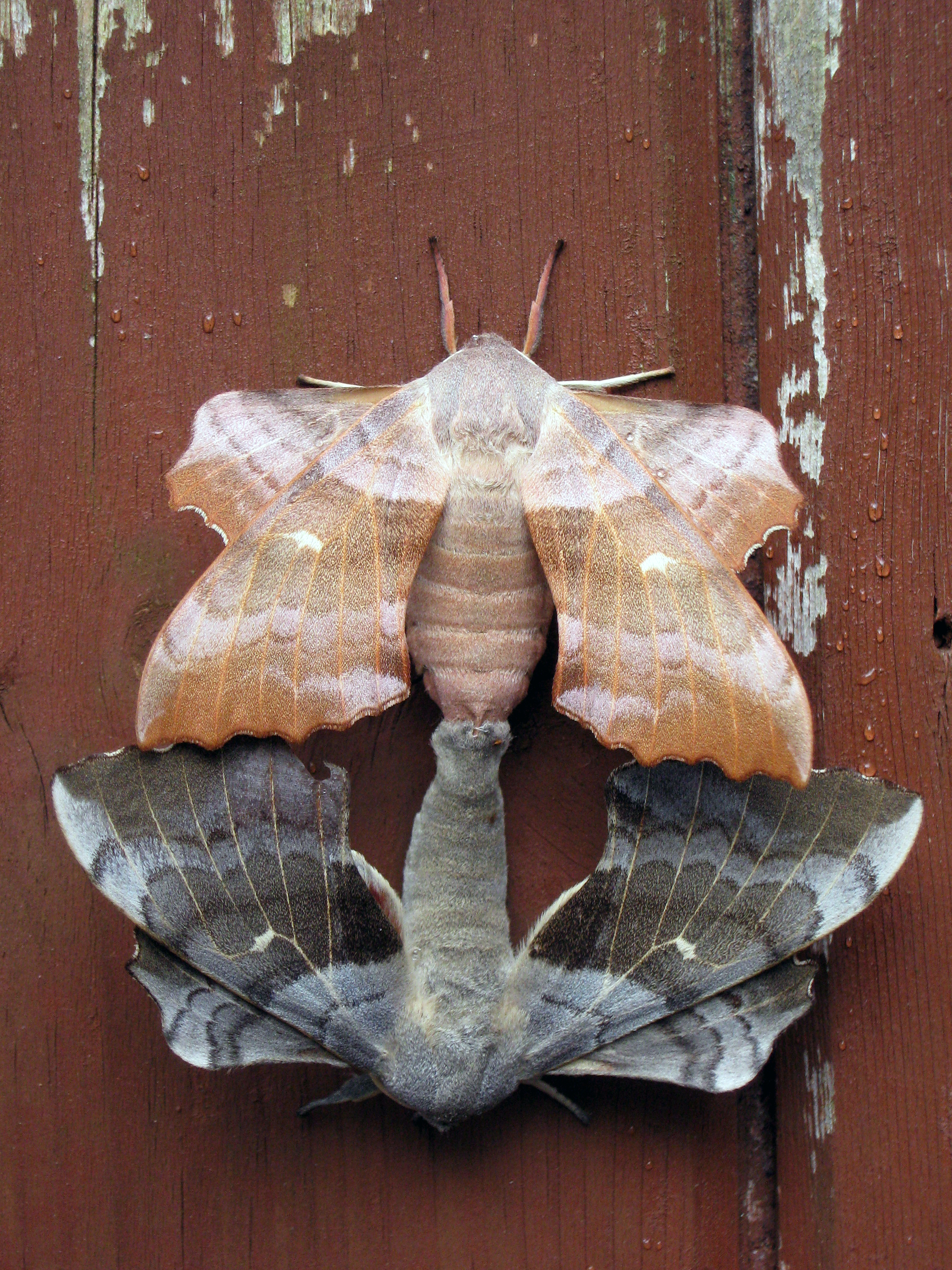
Mating pair of Laothoe populi, or poplar hawkmoths, showing two different color variants

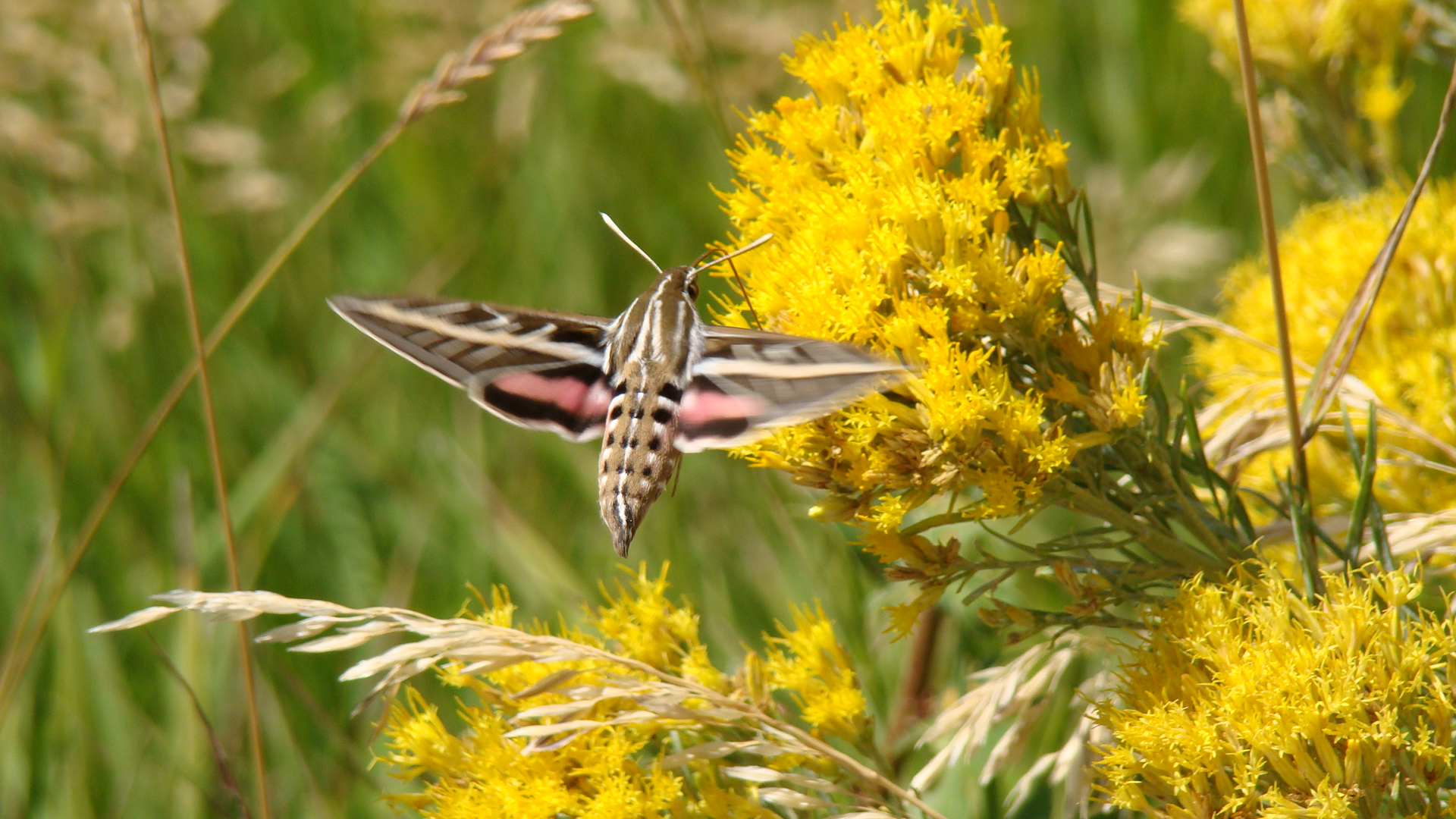
White-lined sphinx moth in Colorado, United States

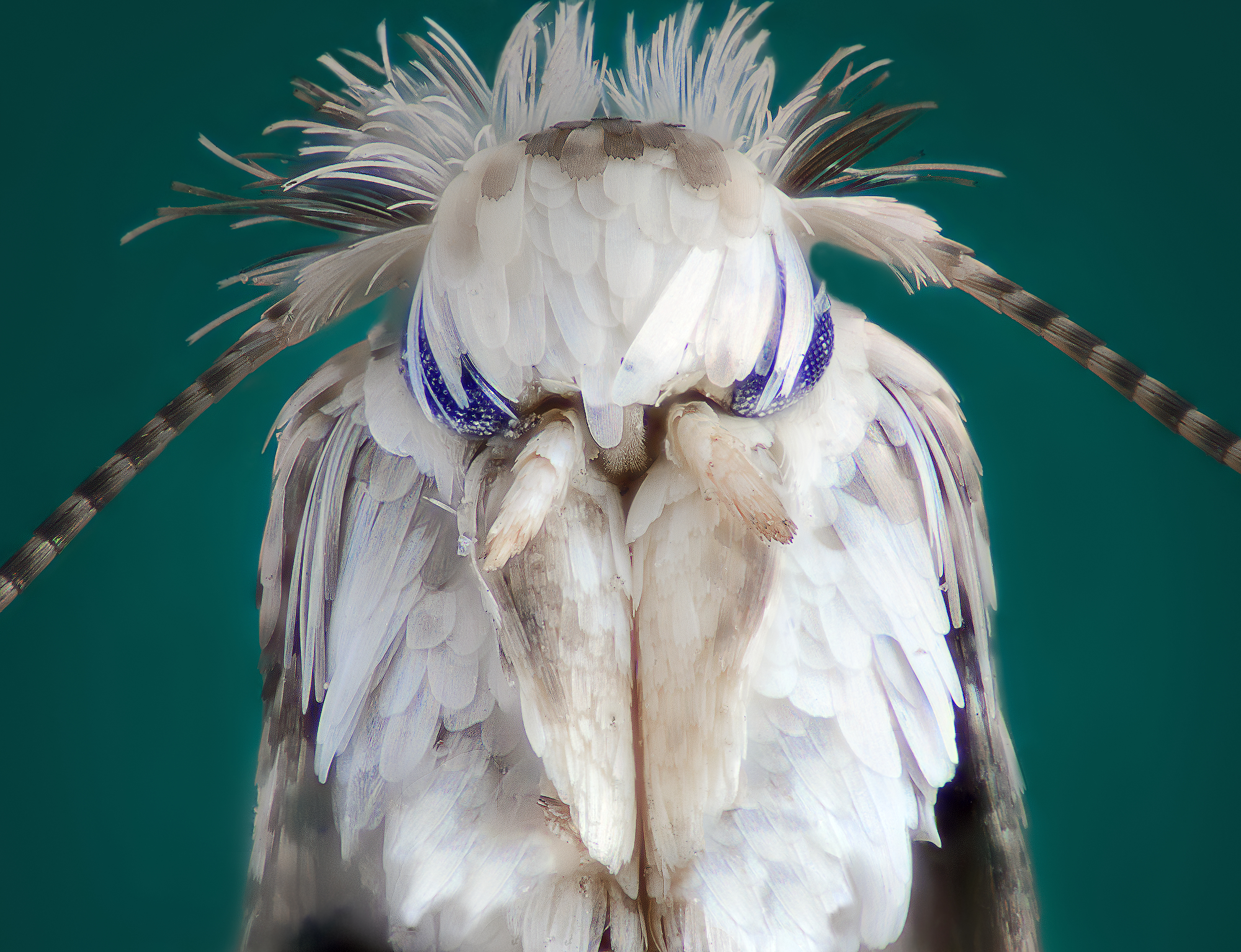
Closeup of a common clothes moth

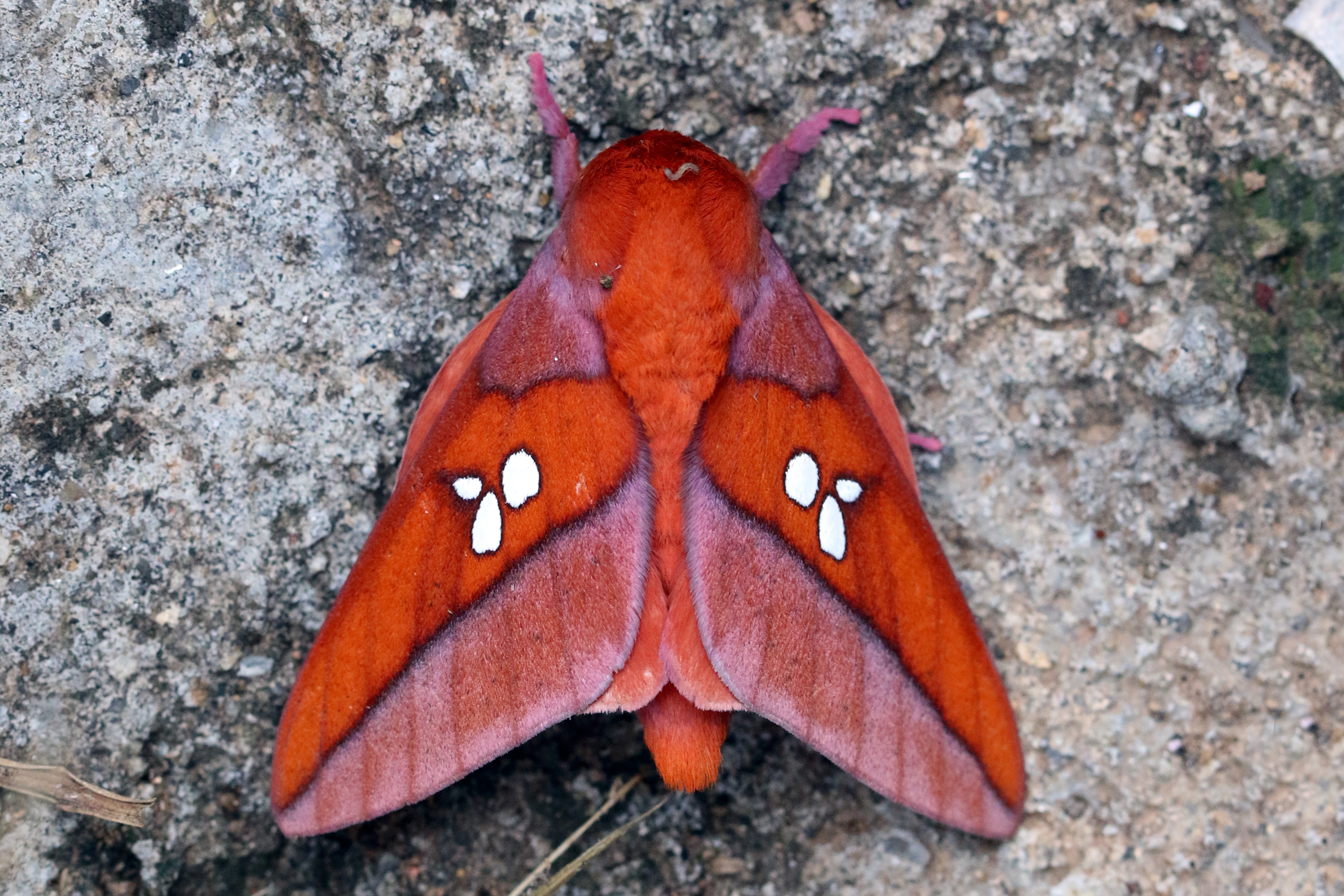
Giant silk moth (Adelowalkeria tristygma)

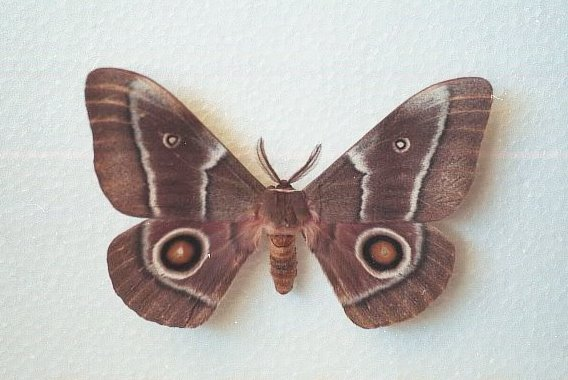
Adult emperor moth (Gonimbrasia belina)

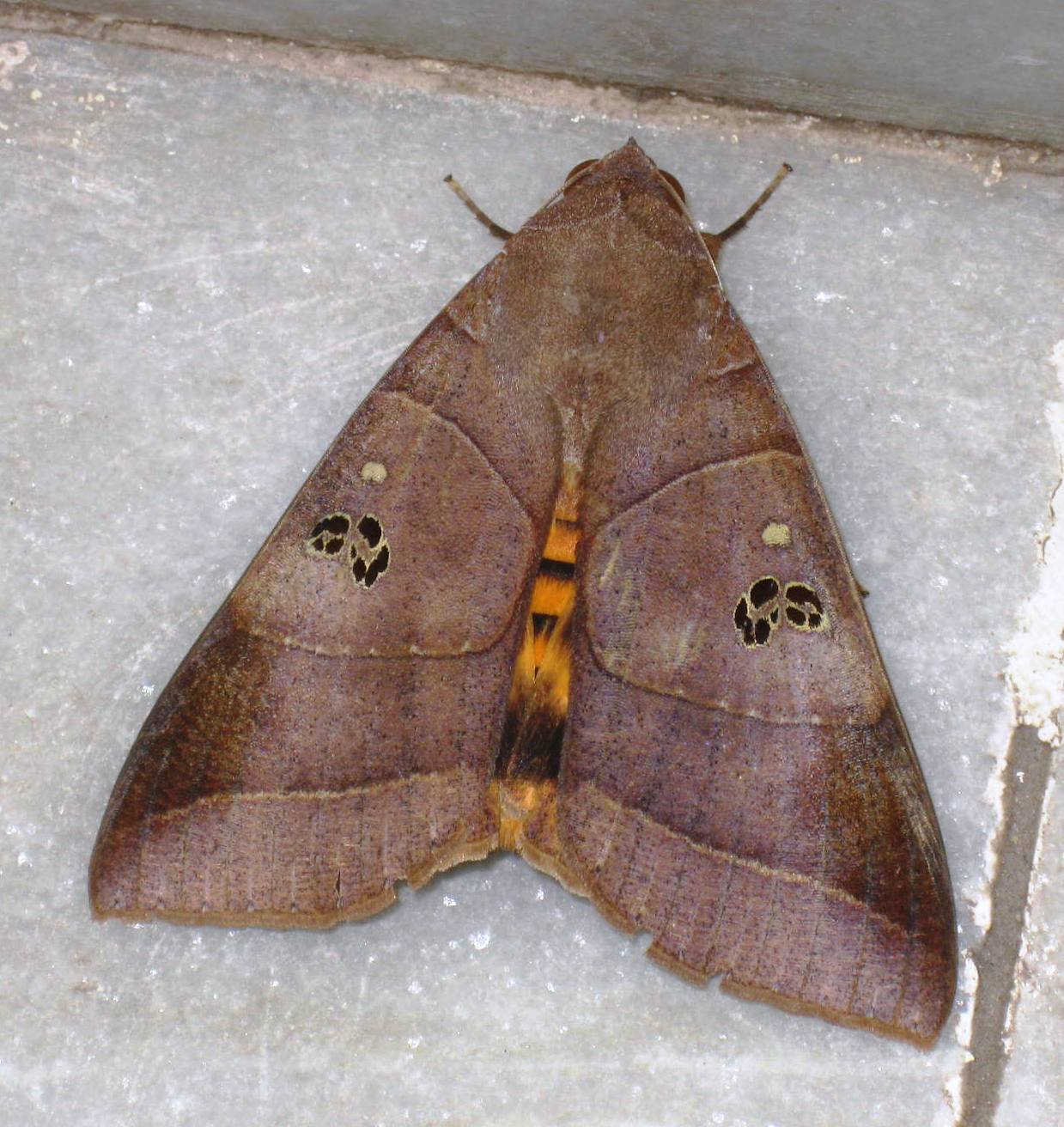
A moth on a marble floor in Kolkata, India

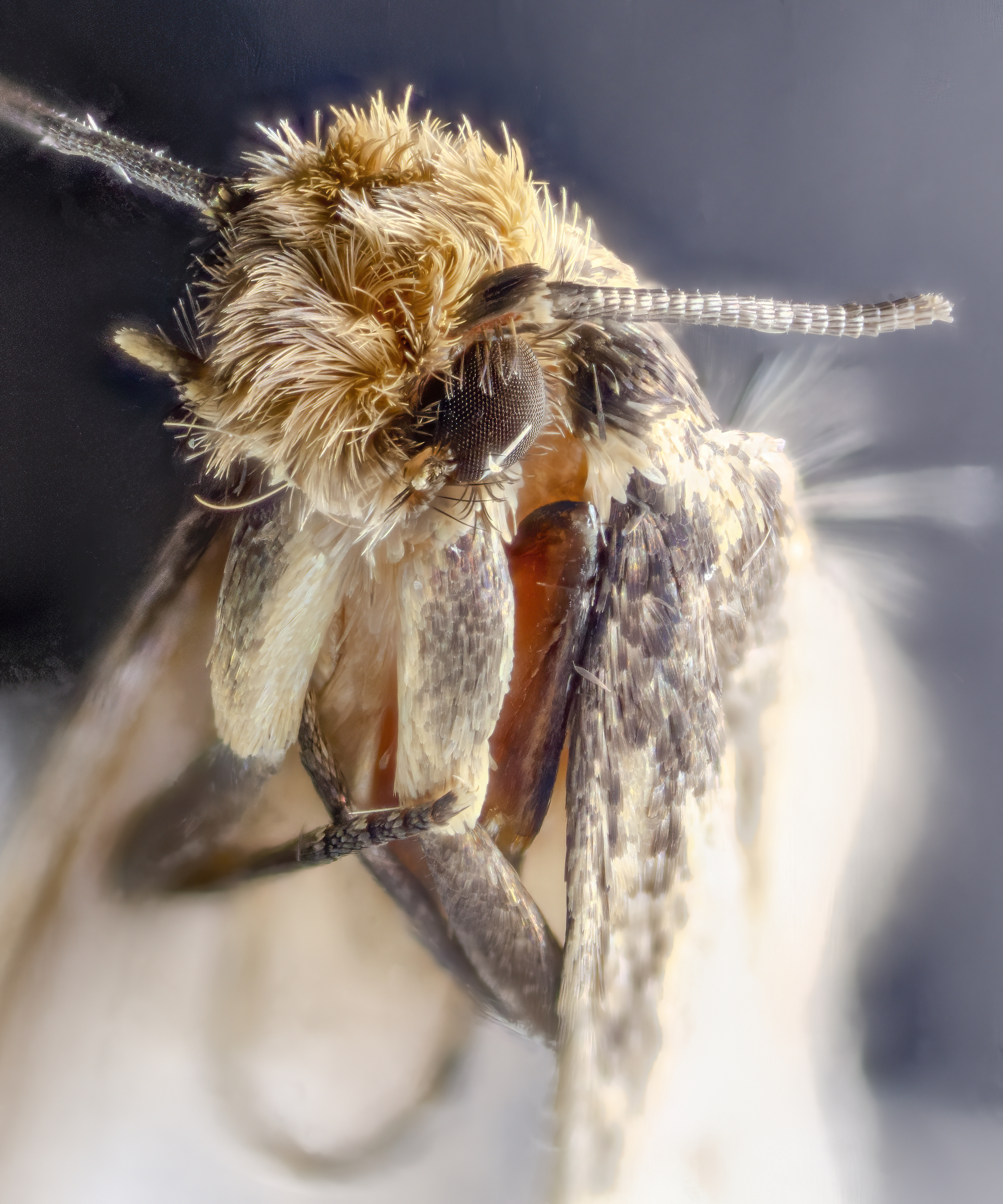
Clothes moth, eye

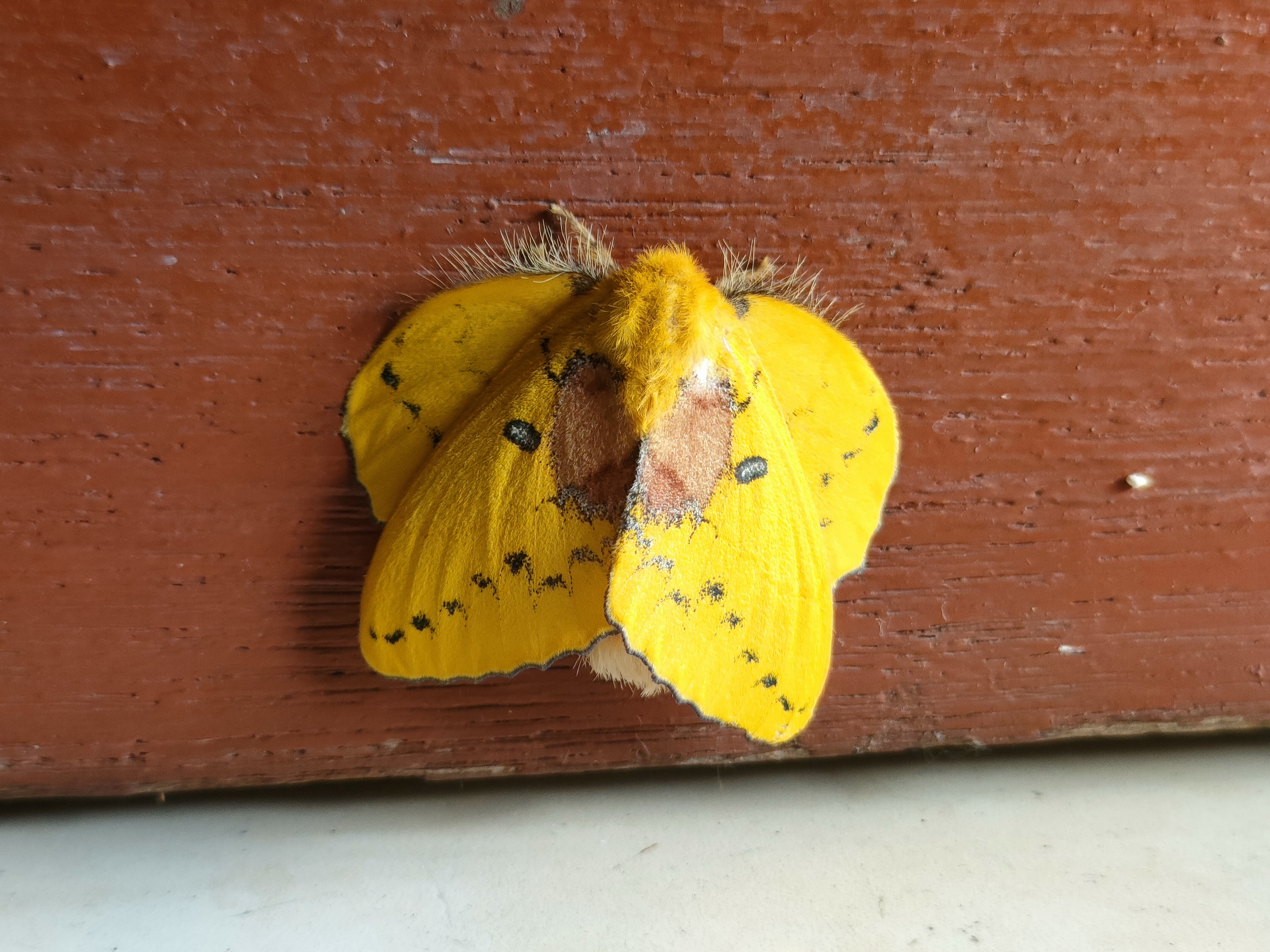
Female rose-myrtle lappet moth hanging on the wooden door

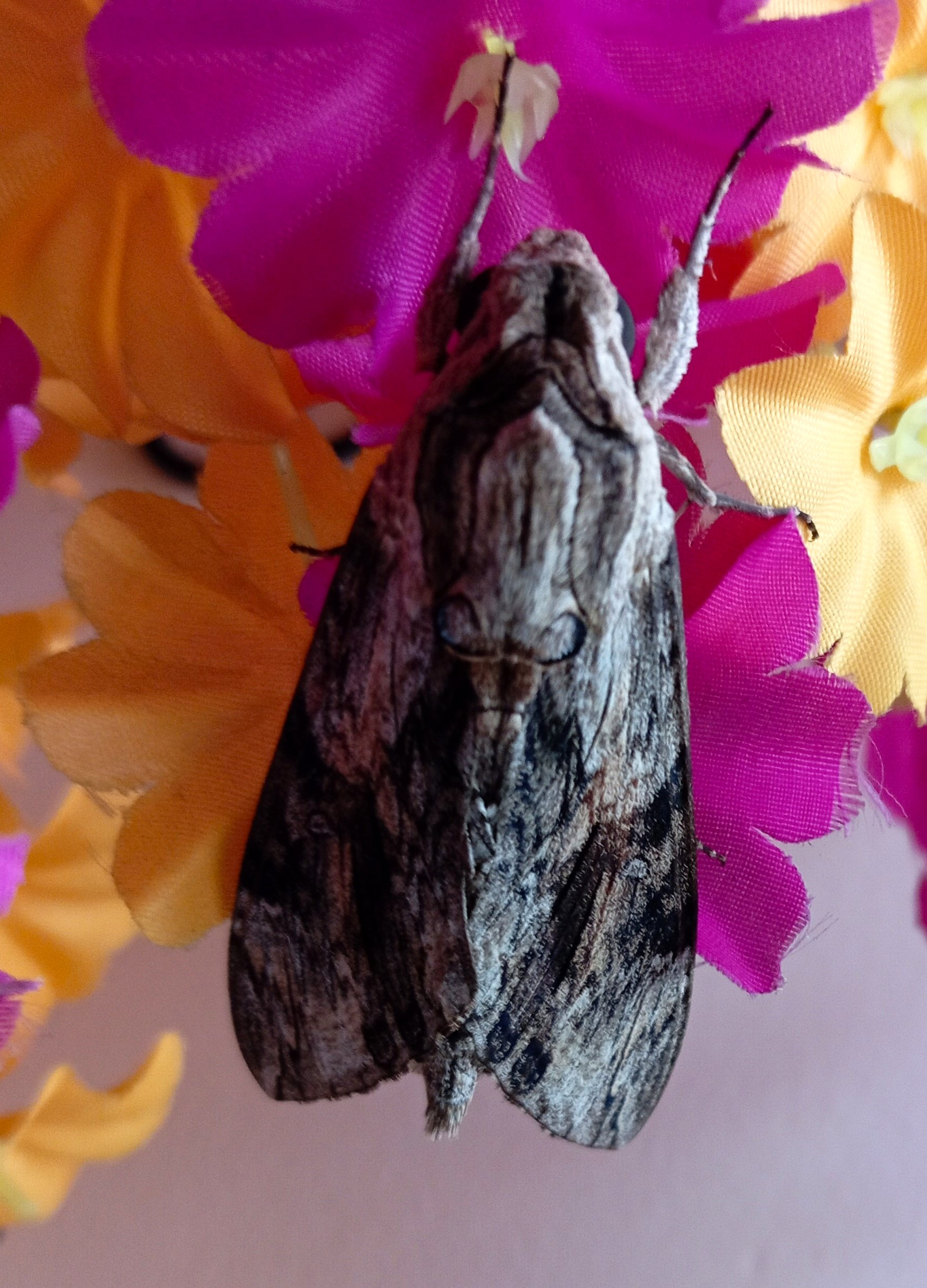
A moth on artificial flowers in Kolkata, India

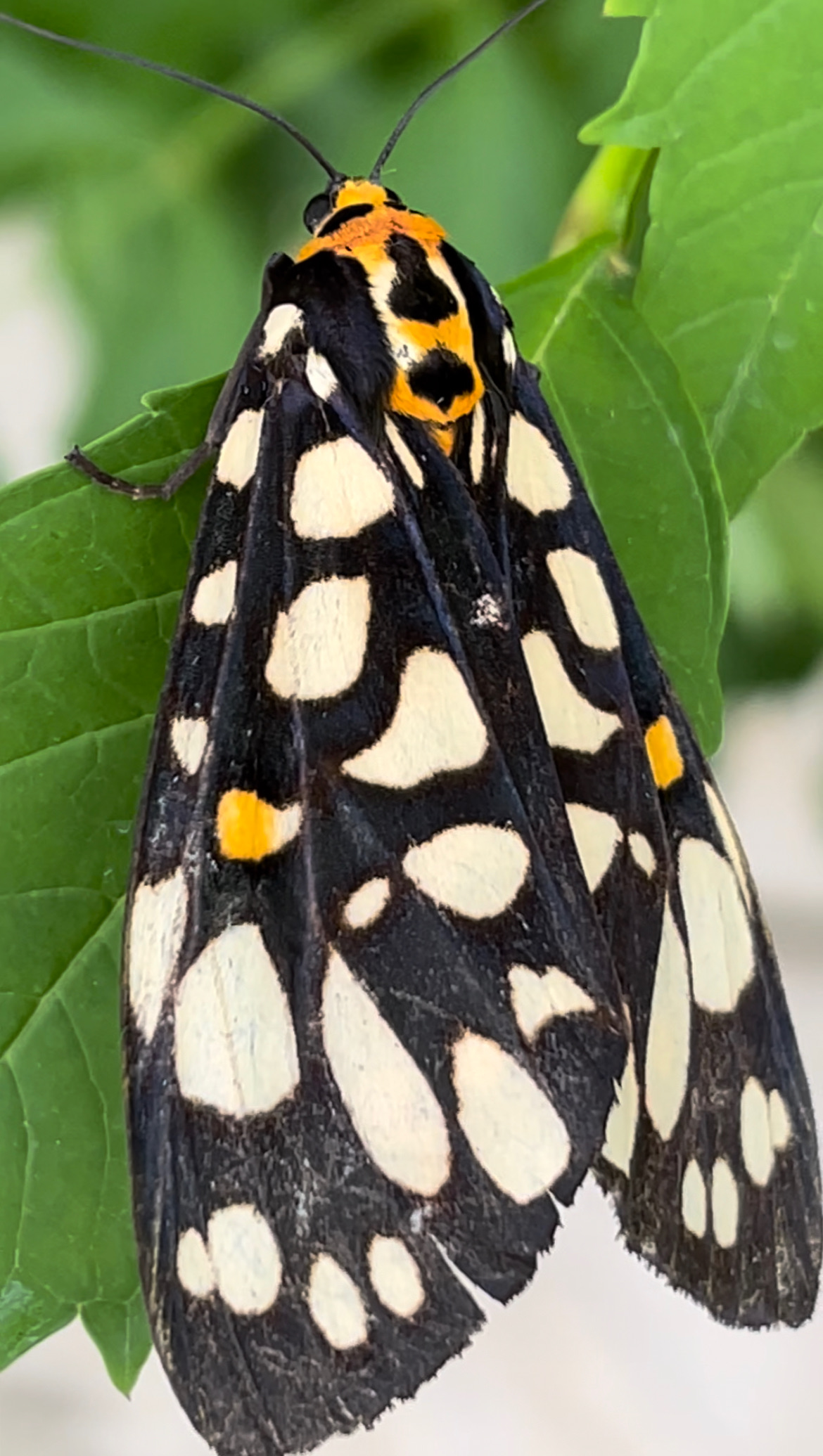
Tiger moth (Aglaomorpha histrio)

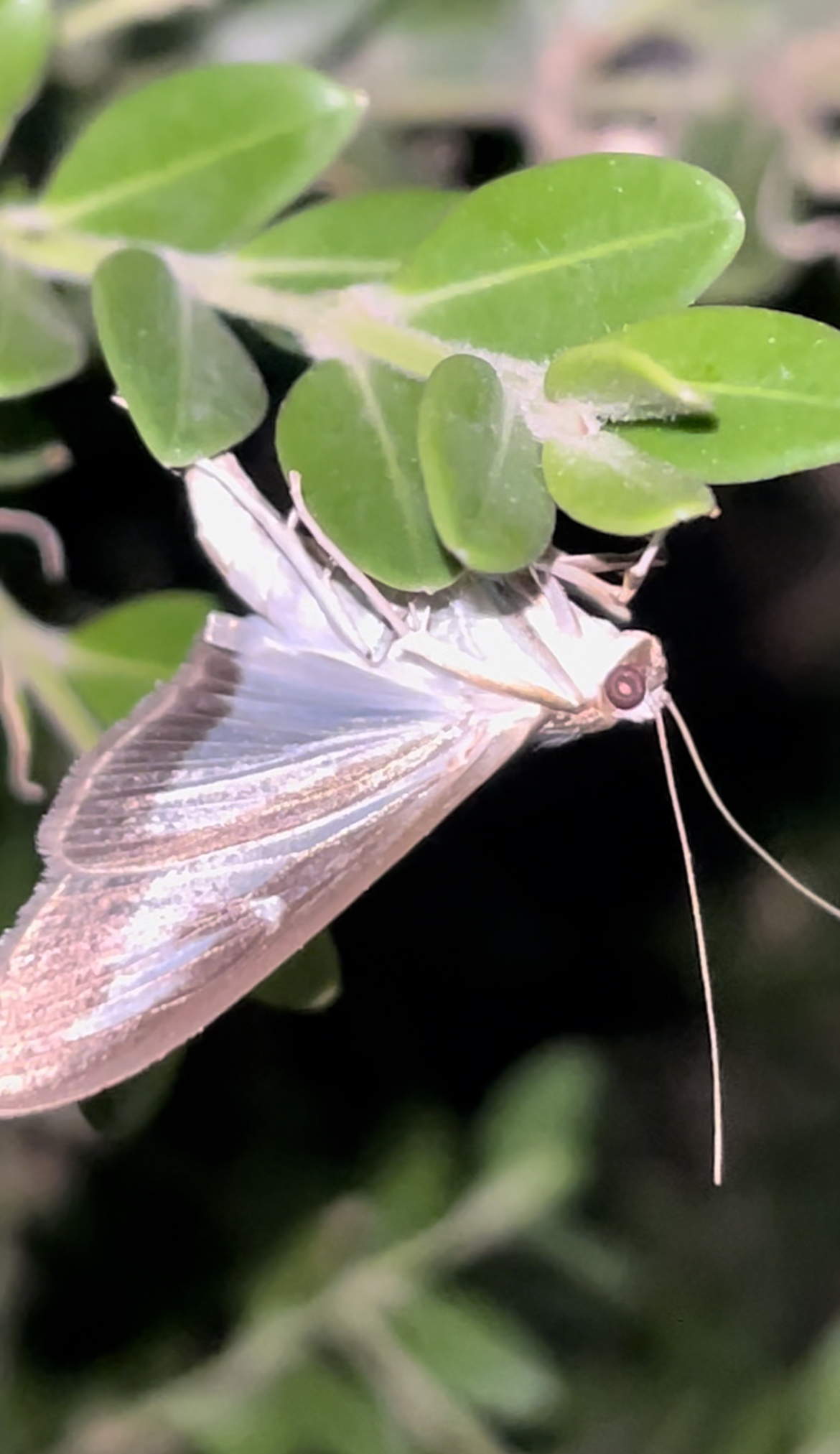
Box tree moth (Cydalima perspectalis)

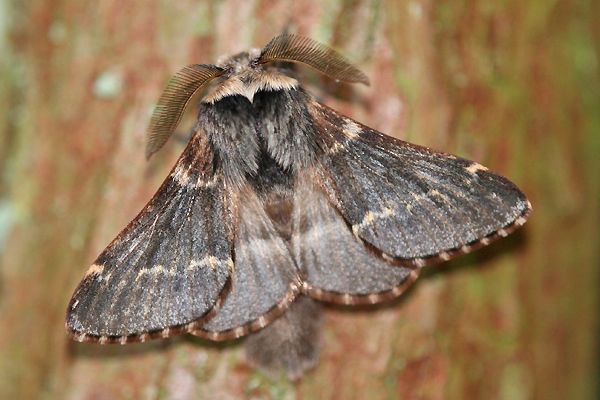
Poecilocampa populi

== See also ==
- Lists of moths
