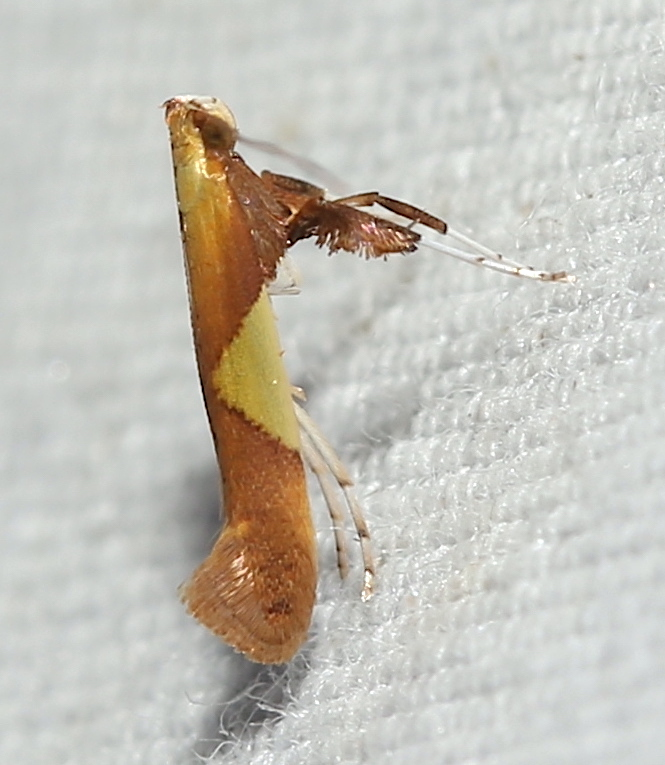

Scientific classification
- Kingdom: Animalia
- Phylum: Arthropoda
- Clade: Pancrustacea
- Class: Insecta
- Order: Lepidoptera
- Family: Gracillariidae
- Genus: Caloptilia
- Species: C. packardella

Binomial name
- Caloptilia packardella (Chambers, 1872)

Synonyms
- Caloptilia elegantella (Frey & Boll, 1873); Caloptilia inornatella (Chambers, 1876)

= Caloptilia packardella =

Species of moth

Caloptilia packardella is a moth of the family Gracillariidae. It is known from Quebec, Canada, and the United States (including Kentucky, New Jersey, New York, Maine, Vermont and Illinois).

The wingspan is about 11 mm. There are at least two generations per year in Illinois.

The larvae feed on Acer species, including Acer platanoides, Acer saccharum and Acer saccharinum. They mine the leaves of their host plant.
