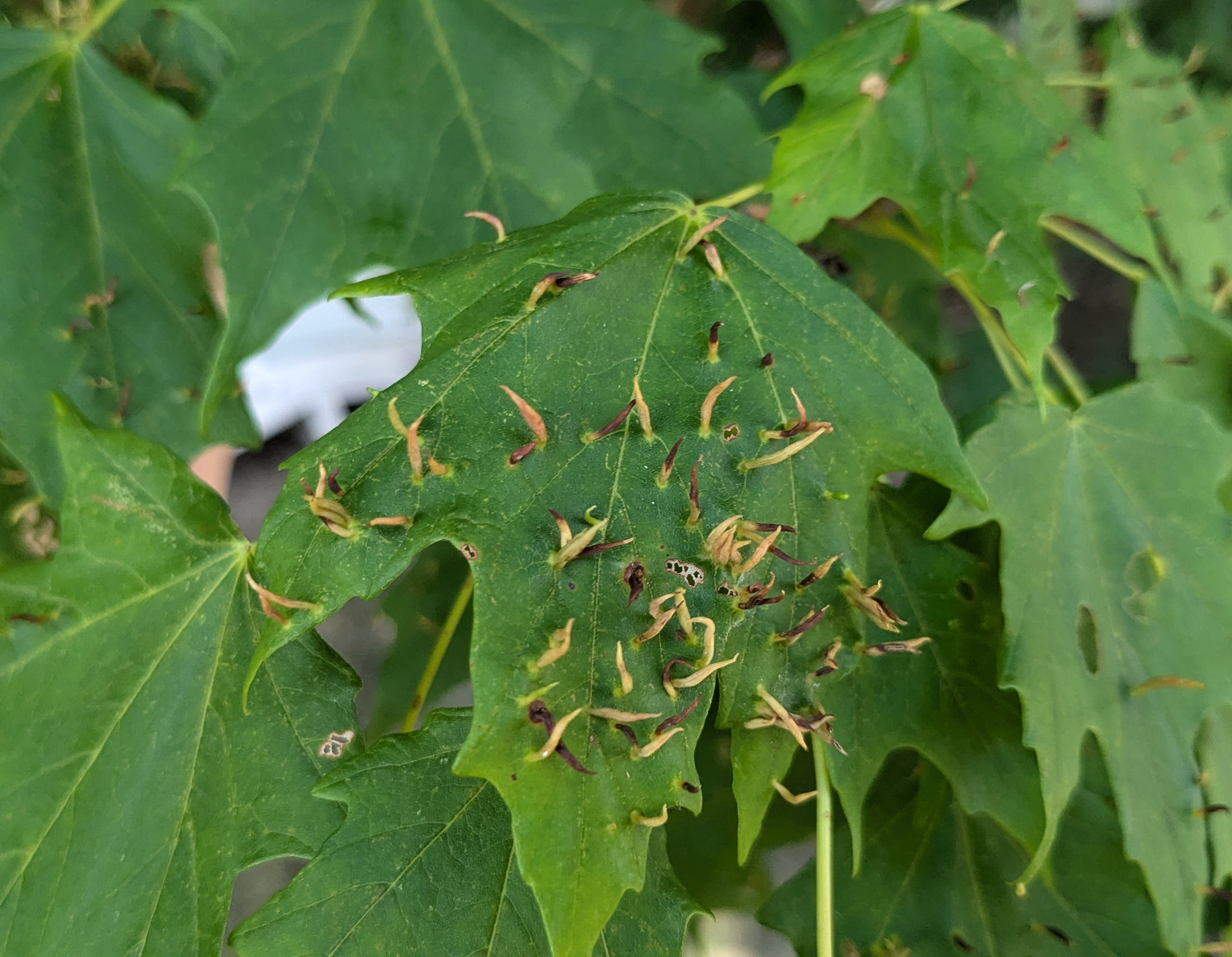

Scientific classification
- Domain: Eukaryota
- Kingdom: Animalia
- Phylum: Arthropoda
- Subphylum: Chelicerata
- Class: Arachnida
- Family: Eriophyidae
- Genus: Vasates
- Species: V. aceriscrumena

Binomial name
- Vasates aceriscrumena (Riley & Vasey, 1870)

= Vasates aceriscrumena =

Species of mite

Vasates aceriscrumena, the maple spindle-gall mite, is an eriophyid mite in the genus Vasates, which causes fusiform galls on the upper surfaces of the leaves of certain maple species in the eastern United States.

== Description ==
The mite itself is microscopic. However, it is visible through the gall that it produces.

Unlike its close relative, the maple bladder-gall mite, the galls produced by the maple spindle gall mite are not rounded, but rather elongate. While unsightly to some, they do not cause major damage to the maple trees themselves, and don't often distort the leaves.

== Range ==
Distributed primarily across the eastern United States.

== Habitat ==
These mites live on maple trees, parasitizing the leaves.

== Ecology ==
Maple spindle-gall mites spend the winter as free-living mites under loosened bark and around wounds. In early spring, they induce gall formation by feeding on leaf buds. The resulting blisters expand into hollow structures as the leaves grow. Asexual reproduction occurs within the galls, with mature mites emerging in late June to mid-July. After the galls dry, adult mites seek overwintering sites.

== Etymology ==
The specific epithet aceriscrumena likely combines a Latin word "crumena, meaning "money bag or purse," with the genitive of Acer, or maple, "aceris."

== Taxonomy ==
Synonyms include Phyllocoptes aceriscrumena.
