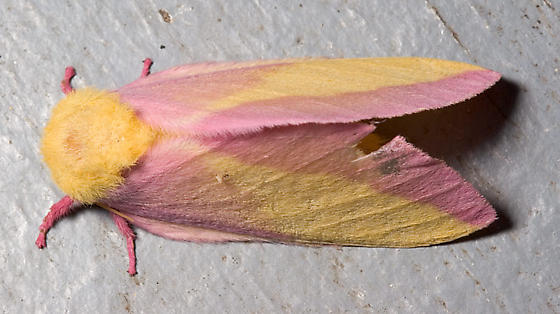
- Dryocampa rubicunda

Scientific classification
- Kingdom: Animalia
- Phylum: Arthropoda
- Clade: Pancrustacea
- Class: Insecta
- Order: Lepidoptera
- Family: Saturniidae
- Subfamily: Ceratocampinae
- Genus: Dryocampa; Harris, 1833

= Dryocampa =

Genus of moths

Dryocampa is a genus of moths in the family Saturniidae. There is only one species of this genus known as Dryocampa rubicunda (Rosy Maple Moth).

== Systematics ==
- Dryocampa alba
- Dryocampa bicolor (Harris, 1841) (Honey locust moth)
- Dryocampa kendallii
- Dryocampa pallida
- Dryocampa rubicunda (Fabricius, 1793) (Rosy maple moth) — U.S.
- Dryocampa semialba
- Dryocampa sperryae
