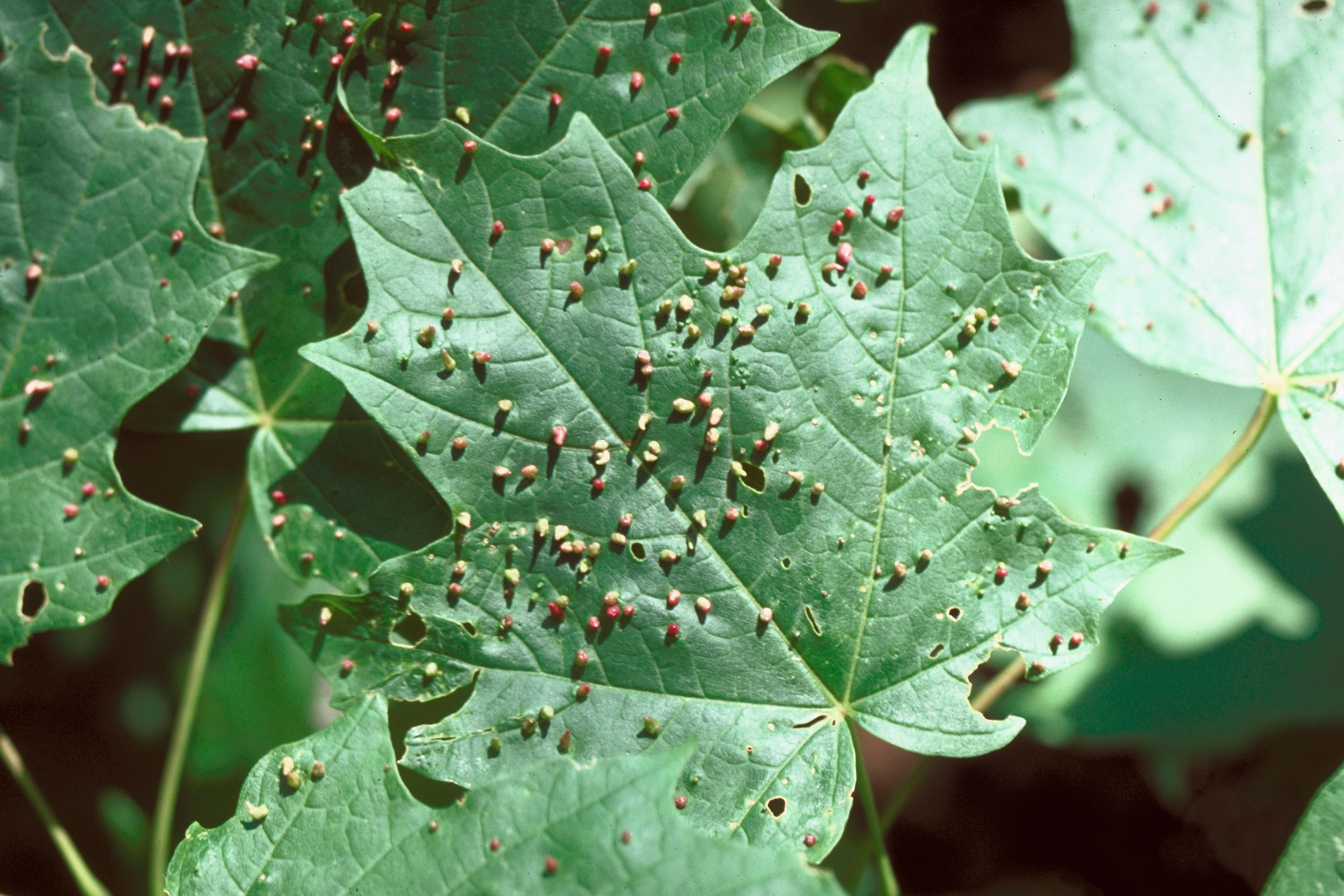
- Galls on sugar maple

Scientific classification
- Domain: Eukaryota
- Kingdom: Animalia
- Phylum: Arthropoda
- Subphylum: Chelicerata
- Class: Arachnida
- Family: Eriophyidae
- Genus: Vasates
- Species: V. quadripedes

Binomial name
- Vasates quadripedes Shimer, 1869

= Vasates quadripedes =

Species of mite

Vasates quadripedes, the maple bladder-gall mite, is an eriophyid mite in the genus Vasates, which causes galls on the leaves of silver maple (Acer saccharinum), red maple (A. rubrum), and sugar maple (A. saccharum). The gall is rounded, sometimes elongate, and has a short, thin neck. Typically, galls are 2–3 millimetres (0.079–0.118 in) in diameter, and may be numerous on the upper surfaces of leaves. They have an opening in the lower surface. At first they are yellowish-green or bright red, later they become dark red and black.

In Britain, the mite affects introduced silver maple. The species is relatively new to Britain, being first recorded in London in 2002.
