= Acer × freemanii =

- Transitioning to autumn color

Scientific classification
- Kingdom: Plantae
- Clade: Tracheophytes
- Clade: Angiosperms
- Clade: Eudicots
- Clade: Rosids
- Order: Sapindales
- Family: Sapindaceae
- Genus: Acer
- Section: Acer sect. Rubra
- Species: A. × freemanii

Binomial name
- Acer × freemanii A.E.Murray

Synonyms
- Acer freemanii

Species of maple

Acer × freemanii, Freeman's maple or Freeman maple, is a naturally occurring hybrid maple that is the result of a cross between Acer rubrum (red maple) and Acer saccharinum (silver maple). Wild specimens are found in eastern North America where the parent species overlap. The species is named after Oliver M. Freeman of the U.S. National Arboretum who hybridized A. rubrum with A. saccharinum in 1933. The fall foliage is a striking orange-red. It has many commercially available cultivars and is frequently used as a street tree.

== Cultivars ==
The cultivars are typically deliberately hybridized and selected in nurseries, not drawn from the wild specimens. Usually infertile to avoid key litter in ornamental settings, they have stronger branch attachments than silver maples and faster growth rates than red maples.

- 'Armstrong', with a more yellow fall foliage
- 'Autumn Fantasy'
- 'Celzam', trade name CELEBRATION
- 'Firefall'
- 'Jeffersred', trade name AUTUMN BLAZE, recipient of the RHS's Award of Garden Merit
- 'Marmo', which does not produce seeds
- 'Morgan' trade name INDIAN SUMMER
- 'Scarsen', trade name SCARLET SENTINEL
- 'Sienna Glen'

== Description ==
Even high-powered morphometric analyses of leaf shape cannot easily distinguish Acer × freemanii individuals from the parent species. In general, Acer × freemanii is intermediate between the parents; because of frequent back-crossing with its parents, a full range of variation can be found.
