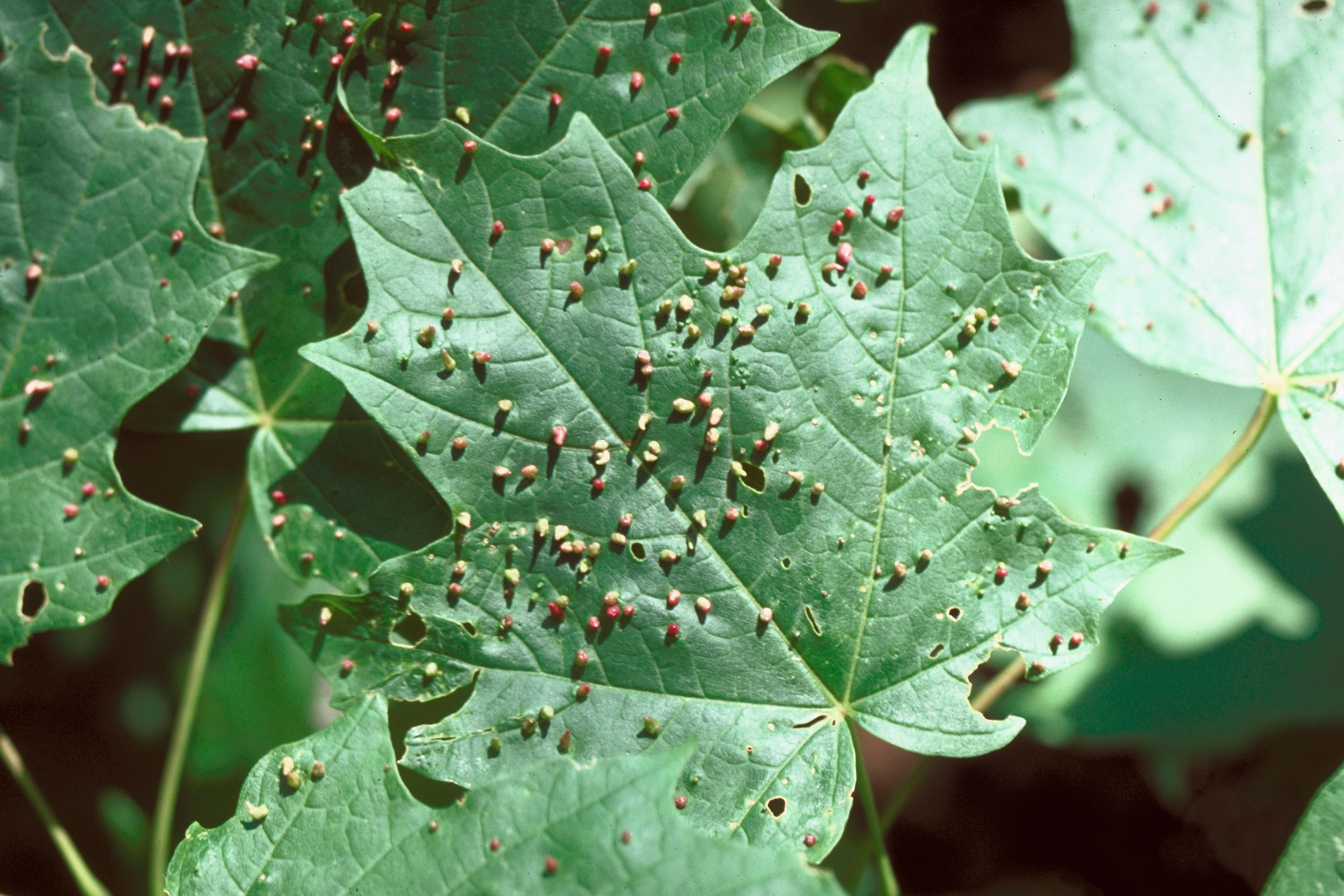
- Vasates quadripedes galls on sugar maple

Scientific classification
- Kingdom: Animalia
- Phylum: Arthropoda
- Subphylum: Chelicerata
- Class: Arachnida
- Family: Eriophyidae
- Genus: Vasates; Shimer, 1869

= Vasates =

Genus of mites

Vasates is a genus of mites in the family Eriophyidae, which cause galls on the leaves of trees, including the following species:

- Vasates aceriscrumena (Riley & Vasey, 1870)
- Vasates quadripedes (Shimer, 1869)
