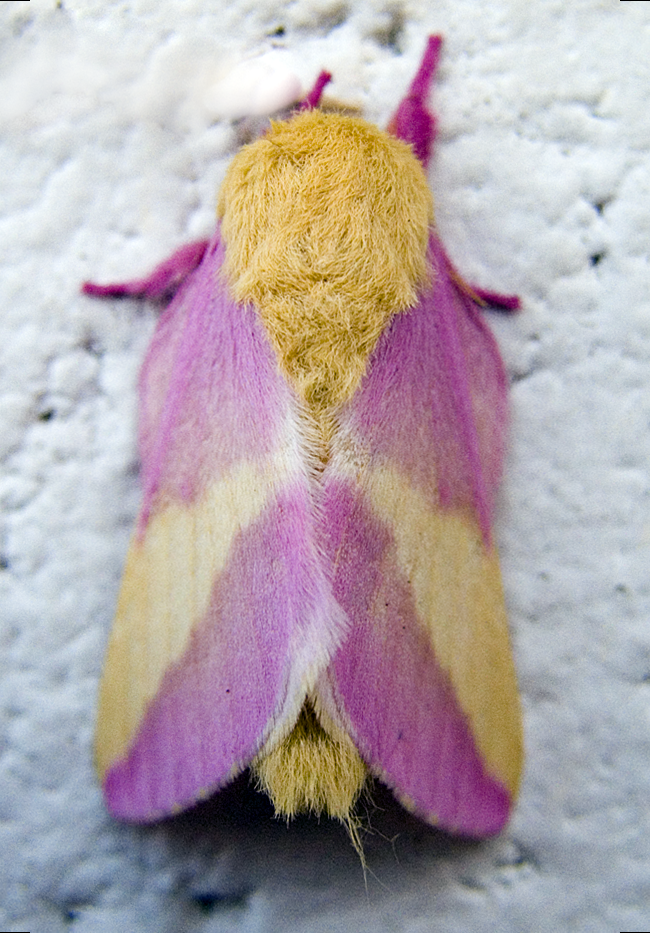

Scientific classification
- Kingdom: Animalia
- Phylum: Arthropoda
- Clade: Pancrustacea
- Class: Insecta
- Order: Lepidoptera
- Family: Saturniidae
- Genus: Dryocampa
- Species: D. rubicunda

Binomial name
- Dryocampa rubicunda (Fabricius, 1793)

= Dryocampa rubicunda =

Rosy maple moth

Species of moth

Dryocampa rubicunda, or the rosy maple moth, is a small North American moth in the family Saturniidae, also known as the great silk moths. It was first described by Johan Christian Fabricius in 1793. The species is known for its wooly body and pink and yellow coloration, which varies from cream or white to bright pink or yellow. Males have bushier antennae than females, which allow them to sense female pheromones for mating.

As the common name of the species implies, the preferred host trees are maple trees. Adult females lay their yellow ovular eggs in groups of 10 to 40 on the underside of maple leaves. The emerging caterpillars, also known as the greenstriped mapleworm, mainly feed on the leaves of their host maple trees, particularly red maple, silver maple, and sugar maple. Since the caterpillars eat the entire leaf blade, in dense populations, caterpillars have been known to defoliate trees, resulting in aesthetic rather than permanent damage. However, like all other Saturniid moths, the adult moths do not eat.

== Description ==
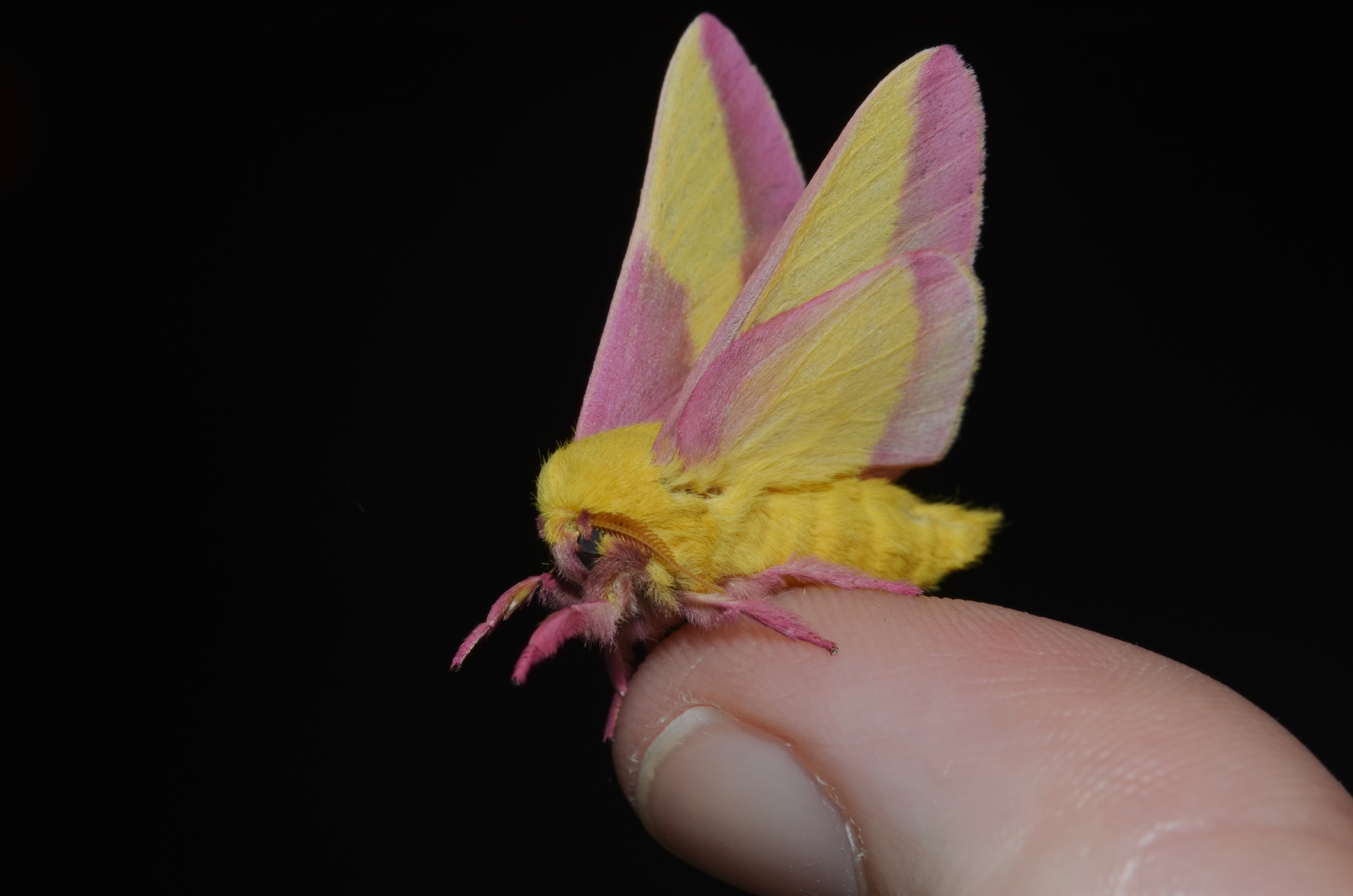
Rosy maple moths are the smallest of the silk moths

The rosy maple moth is the smallest of the silk moths; males have a wingspan of 3.2 to 4.4 centimeters (1.25-1.75 in); females of 3.8 to 5 centimeters (1.5–2 in). The species can be identified by their unique, but varying, pink and yellow coloration. They have reddish-to-pink legs and antennae, yellow bodies and hindwings, and pink forewings with a triangular yellow band across the middle.

== Geographic range ==
The rosy maple moth lives across the eastern and northern United States and adjacent regions of Canada. Their northernmost range includes the southern regions of Canada, including Ontario, Quebec, New Brunswick, Nova Scotia, and Prince Edward Island. Their range extends south along the Atlantic coast of North America to Dade County, Florida, and extends west from eastern Texas through Minnesota.

== Habitat ==
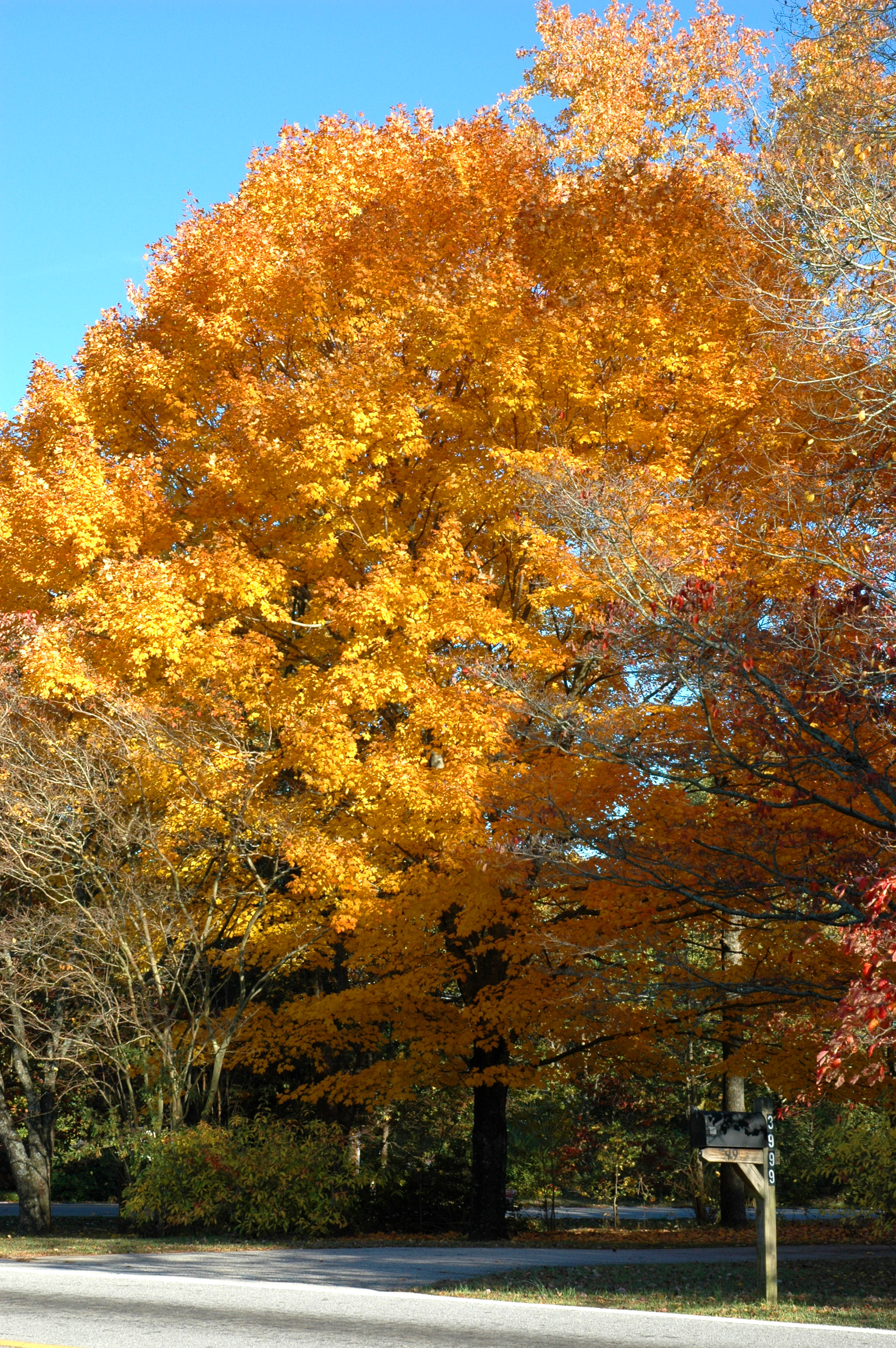
Sugar maple

The rosy maple moth can be found in temperate deciduous forests and nearby suburban areas and urban landscapes. Their common name derives from the fact that they can primarily be found on maple trees, including red maples (Acer rubrum), sugar maples (Acer saccharum), silver maples (Acer saccharinum), and box elder maples (Acer negundo). They can also be found on oak trees, particularly turkey oaks (Quercus laevis), especially when they are found dispersed among maple trees.

== Home range and territoriality ==
Larvae hatch and live on the same tree through their development, then pupate in the soil beneath the same tree. The larvae primarily eat the underside of leaves, therefore preferentially staying in that location of their home tree. The adults do not eat, so they can have a sizeable home range.

== Behavior ==
=== Feeding ===
The rosy maple moths preferentially lay their eggs on maple trees, and sometimes nearby oak trees. Since the larvae remain on the same tree upon which they hatched, most larvae feed on the underside of maple leaves or oak leaves. In early instars, the larvae feed together in groups, but beginning in the third or fourth instar the caterpillars begin to feed individually. The larvae eat the entire leaf blade and are capable of consuming a few leaves each. Thus, large populations of greenstriped mapleworms are capable of defoliating trees. This damage is mostly harmless and the leaves will grow back. As with all Saturniidae, adult rosy maple moths do not feed.

=== Parental care ===
==== Oviposition ====
Female rosy maple moths lay their eggs one day after fertilization. During those 24 hours, the eggs are protected inside the body of the female. Besides this, rosy maple moths exhibit little parental care, as the female leaves after depositing her eggs. Females typically lay around 150 to 200 eggs in groups of 10 to 40 on the underside of leaves of maple trees and occasionally oak trees. Females typically only reproduce once, but in southern regions they can lay eggs up to three times. Egg laying typically occurs in the warmer months, with a peak in July, although precise timing depends on the region. In northern regions, one brood is laid between May and August. Further south, two broods are laid between April and September. In Florida, between March and October three broods are laid.

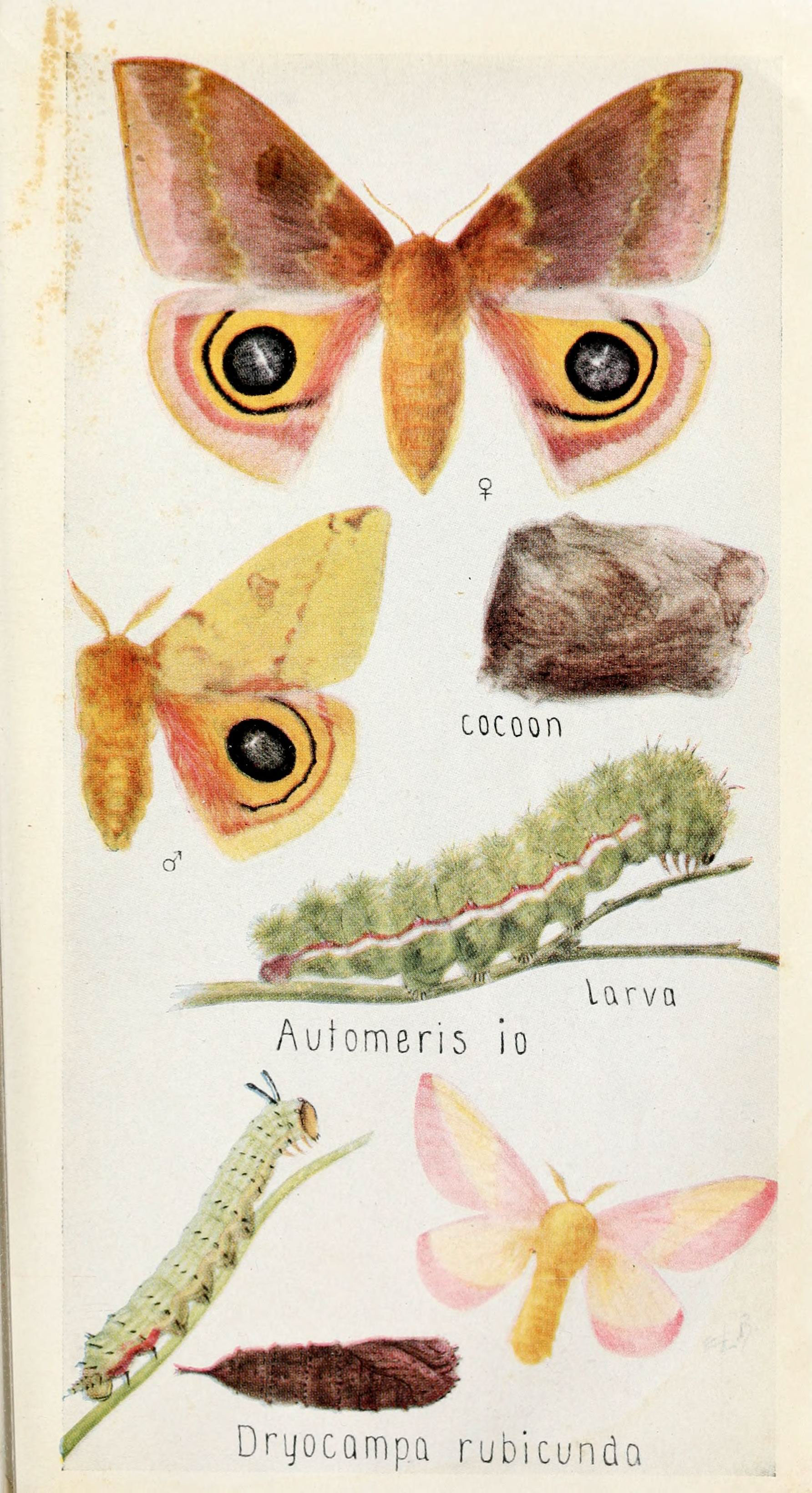
Life cycle of a rosy maple moth(+ Automeris io)

=== Social behavior ===
Caterpillars live and feed in groups until the fourth instar when they become solitary. Adult rosy maple moths are mostly solitary besides during mating.

== Life cycle ==
Individual rosy maple moths typically live for about two to nine months. Between hatching and adulthood, the species undergoes five instars. For moths with longer life spans, much of this time is spent as a pupa over the winter months.

=== Eggs ===
Eggs are laid 24 hours after fertilization. The eggs are ovular and about 1.4 mm in diameter, with a thin smooth yellow shell. Eggs hatch after about ten days to two weeks. After hatching, a transparent egg shell is left behind.

=== Caterpillar ===
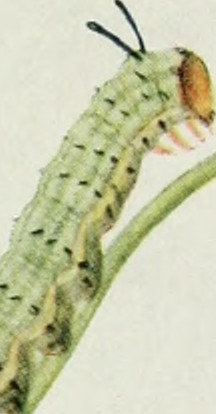
Greenstriped mapleworm

Rosy maple moth larvae are known as greenstriped mapleworms, and they undergo five instars prior to adulthood, during which their coloration and eating behavior changes. In early instars, the larvae have relatively large black heads and pale yellow-green bodies with faint green stripes. They have two large dark-green to black tubercles on the second thoracic segment and three rows of smaller spines, or setae, on each side of their body. The larvae undergo their first molt around 6–11 days after hatching, their second molt approximately 12 days after hatching, and their third molt around 19 days post hatching. In the next instars, the black head becomes smaller relative to the diameter of the body and the longitudinal stripes darken and become reddish. In later instars, the head becomes yellow, and in the final instar, becomes bright red. By the final instar, the body is yellow green with longitudinal stripes that range from white to green to black. The two prominent horns on the second thoracic segment are accompanied by two rows of short spines found along both sides of the body. At maturity, the caterpillars reach lengths of about 2 inches. Until the fourth instar, the larvae live and feed together, but in their final two instars they are solitary.

=== Pupa ===
After about a month, full-grown caterpillars crawl to the bottom of the host tree and pupate in shallow underground chambers. The pupae are very dark, elongated, and have small spines. The pupa ends in a small forked point. The pupal stage lasts at least two weeks and up to the whole winter. If the moths pupate over winter, the majority of their lives are spent in the pupal stage. When the imago (adult) ecloses, it has small wings which it has to pump full of fluid in order to expand them and allow for flight.

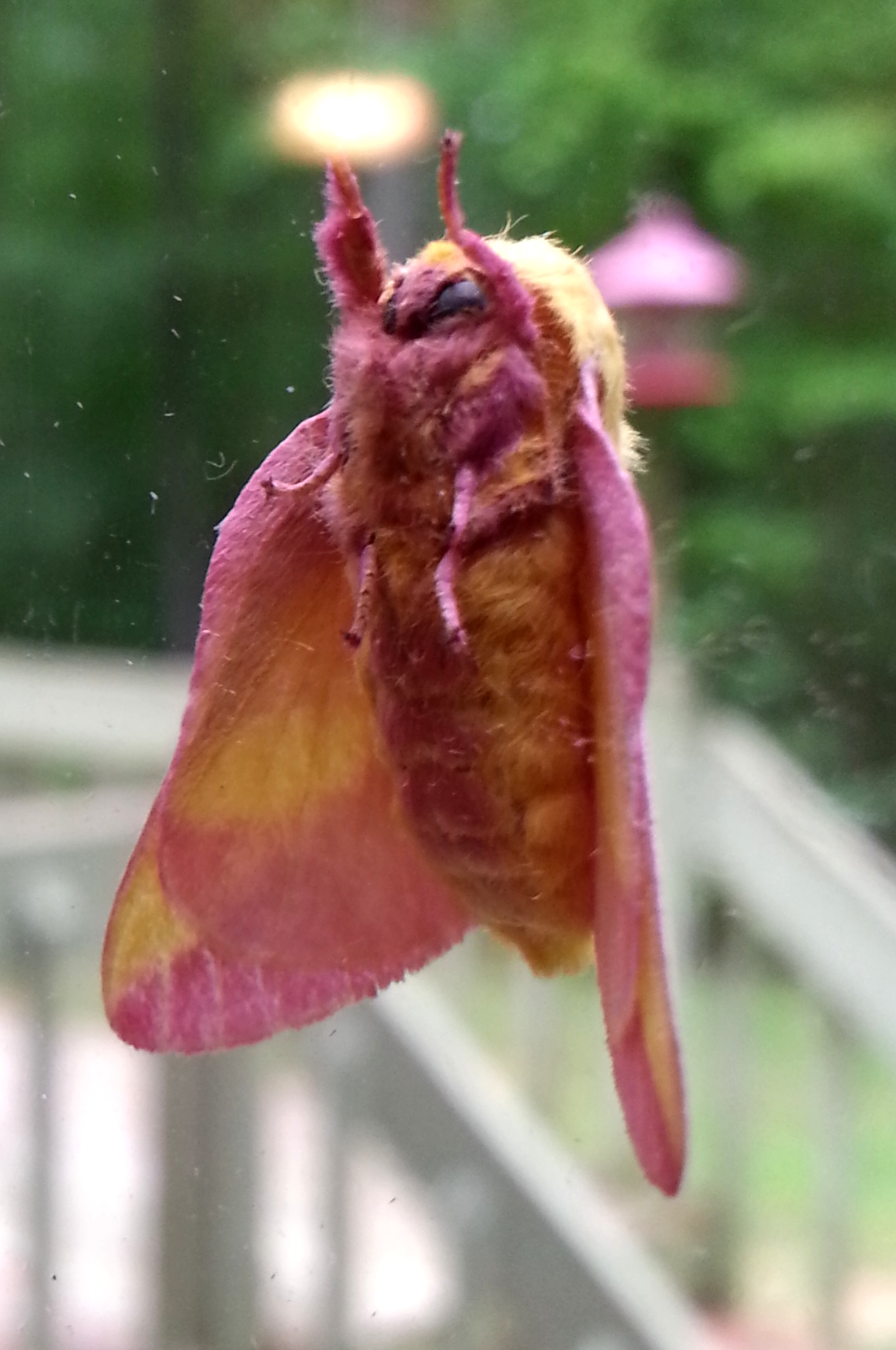
Rosy maple moth

=== Adult ===
Adult rosy maple moths are distinguishable by their bright pink and yellow color, although exact coloration can vary significantly. Both sexes have a wingspan of 32–55 mm. Their bodies are woolly, and typically yellow on the top and pink on the underside, but can range to cream or white. Their legs and antennae are also pink. The forewings can be yellow to white with varying amounts of pink along the edges. The alba subspecies, found in Missouri, is completely white or white with faint pink markings.

== Predators ==
The predators of the rosy maple moth and larvae mostly consist of birds including blue jays, black-capped chickadees, and tufted titmice. The bright coloration of the wings may serve as a defense mechanism to trick predators into thinking they are poisonous and not edible.

== Mating ==
Rosy maple moths exhibit sexual dimorphism; that is, males and females have different appearances. In the case of the rosy maple moth, males have narrower and less rounded wings. Additionally, while females have simple antennae, males have bipectinate (comb-like on both sides) antennae to sense females' pheromones during mating. The moths become sexually mature at 2 to 9 months of age. Mating occurs at night, when females release pheromones to attract males. Fertilization occurs internally, and females lay their eggs 24 hours after mating. The moths are polygynandrous: females find a new male to mate with each time during breeding season when multiple broods are laid per season in warmer regions.

== Thermoregulation ==
Adults become active in the warmer months of the year. In a study that compared D. rubicunda with Actias luna, the prevalence of the rosy maple moth was found to vary with changes in temperature, with highest counts at the highest temperature, perhaps due to the tropical origin of the subfamily Ceratocampinae. Their small size, preventing more effective body temperature control, may also contribute to their preference for warm weather. Adult moths are generally nocturnal, preferentially flying throughout the first third of the night.
