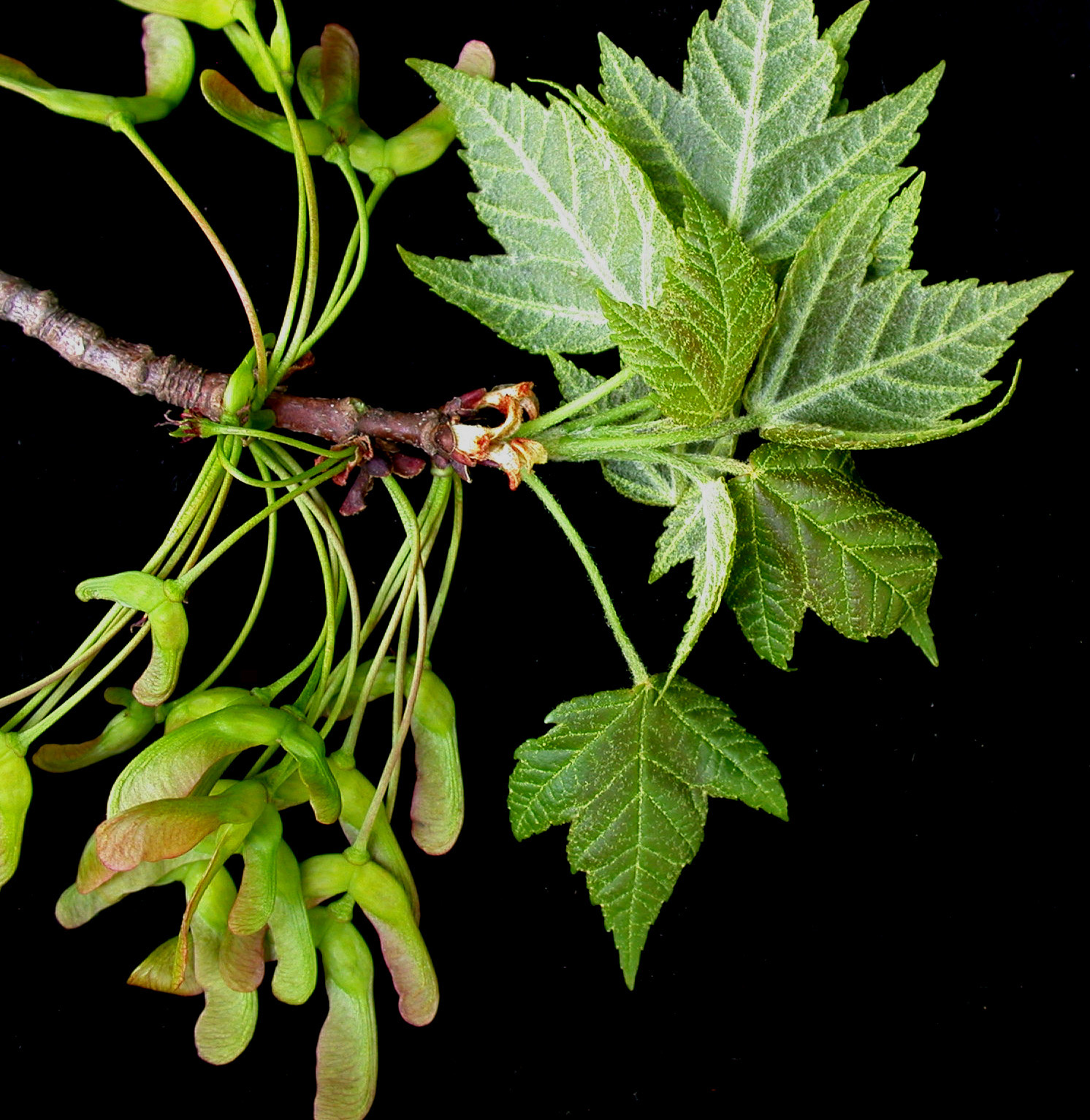

Conservation status
- Least Concern (IUCN 3.1)

- Secure (NatureServe)

Scientific classification
- Kingdom: Plantae
- Clade: Tracheophytes
- Clade: Angiosperms
- Clade: Eudicots
- Clade: Rosids
- Order: Sapindales
- Family: Sapindaceae
- Genus: Acer
- Section: Acer sect. Rubra
- Species: A. rubrum

Binomial name
- Acer rubrum L.
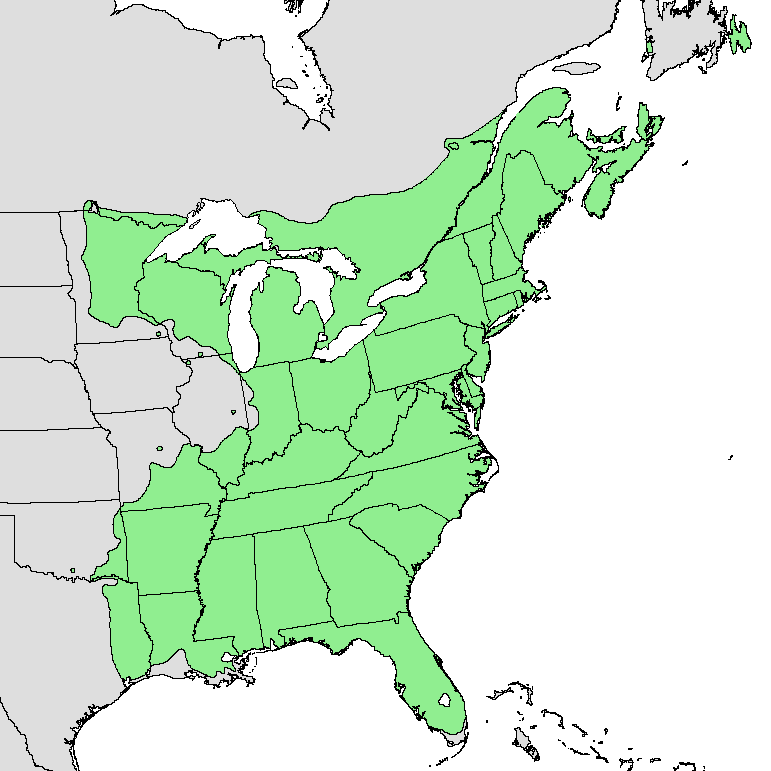

Synonyms
- List: Acer carolinianum Walter; Acer coccineum F.Michx.; Acer drummondii Hook. & Arn. ex Nutt.; Acer fulgens Dippel; Acer glaucum Marshall; Acer glaucum K.Koch; Acer hypoleucum K.Koch 1869 not Hayata 1913; Acer microphyllum Pax 1886 not Opiz 1824; Acer sanguineum Spach; Acer semiorbiculatum Pax; Acer splendens Dippel; Acer wagneri Wesm.; Rufacer carolinianum (Walter) Small; Rufacer drummondii (Hook. & Arn. ex Nutt.) Small; Rufacer rubrum (L.) Small

= Acer rubrum =

Maple tree native in North America

Acer rubrum, the red maple, also known as swamp maple, water maple, or soft maple, is a North American tree species. Many of its features, especially its deciduous leaves, are quite variable in form. At maturity, it often attains a height around 30 metres (100 ft). Its flowers, petioles, twigs, and seeds are all red to varying degrees.

Red maple is one of the most common and widespread deciduous trees of eastern North America. Its distribution ranges from southeastern Manitoba around the Lake of the Woods on the border with Ontario and Minnesota, east to Newfoundland, south to Florida, and southwest to East Texas. Over most of its range, red maple is adaptable to a very wide range of site conditions. It can be found growing in swamps, on poor, dry soils, and almost anywhere in between from sea level to about 900 m (3,000 ft).

Due to its attractive red fall foliage and pleasing form, it is often used as a shade tree for landscapes. It is used commercially on a small scale for maple syrup production and for its lumber, which is of medium to high quality.

== Description ==
Though A. rubrum is sometimes easy to identify, it is highly variable in morphological characteristics. It is a medium to large tree, reaching heights of 27 to 38 m (90 to 120 ft) and exceptionally over 41 m (135 ft) in the southern Appalachians where conditions favour its growth. The leaves are usually 9 to 11 cm (3 1/2 to 4 1/4 in) long on a full-grown tree. The trunk diameter often ranges from 46 to 88 cm (18 to 35 in); depending on the growing conditions, however, open-grown trees can attain diameters of up to 153 cm (60 in). The trunk remains free of branches until some distance up the tree on forest grown trees, while individuals grown in the open are shorter and thicker with a more rounded crown. Trees on poorer sites often become malformed and scraggly. Generally the crown is irregularly ovoid with ascending whip-like curved shoots. The bark is a pale grey and smooth when the individual is young. As the tree grows the bark becomes darker and cracks into slightly raised long plates. The tallest known living red maple is near Sevierville in the Great Smoky Mountains National Park, with a height of 43.59 m (143.0 ft), and the largest known is near Armada, Michigan, with a height of 38.1 m (125 ft) and a bole circumference, at breast height, of 4.95 m (16 ft 3 in).

The leaves of the red maple are deciduous and arranged oppositely on the twig. They are around 5–10 cm (2–4 in) long and wide with three to five palmate lobes and a serrated margin. The sinuses are typically narrow, but the leaves can exhibit considerable variation.

The twigs are reddish in color and somewhat shiny with small lenticels. Dwarf shoots are present on many branches. The buds are usually blunt and greenish to reddish in color, generally with several loose scales. The lateral buds are slightly stalked, and in addition, collateral buds may be present, as well. The buds form in fall and winter and are often visible from a distance due to their large size and reddish tint. The leaf scars on the twig are V-shaped and contain three bundle scars.

The flowers are generally unisexual, with male and female flowers appearing in separate sessile clusters, though they are sometimes bisexual. They appear in late winter to early spring, from December to May depending on elevation and latitude, usually before the leaves. The tree itself is considered polygamodioecious, meaning some individuals are male, some female, and some monoecious. Under the proper conditions, the tree can sometimes switch from male to female, male to hermaphroditic, and hermaphroditic to female. The red maple begins blooming when it is about 8 years old, but this varies from tree to tree: some trees begin flowering when they are 4 years old. The flowers are red with 5 small petals and a 5-lobed calyx, usually at the twig tips. The staminate flowers are sessile. The pistillate flowers are borne on pedicels that grow out while the flowers are blooming, so that eventually the flowers are in a hanging cluster with stems 1 to 5 cm (1/2 to 2 in) long. The petals are lineal to oblong in shape and are pubescent. The pistillate flowers have one pistil formed from two fused carpels with a glabrous superior ovary and two long styles that protrude beyond the perianth. The staminate flowers contain between 4 and 12 stamens, often with 8.

The fruit is a schizocarp of 2 samaras, each one 15 to 25 mm (5/8 to 1 in) long. Prior to dehiscence, the wings of the fruit are somewhat divergent at an angle of 50 to 60°. They are borne on long slender pedicels and are variable in color from light brown to reddish. They ripen from April through early June, before even the leaf development is altogether complete. After they reach maturity, the seeds are dispersed for a 1- to 2-week period from April through July.

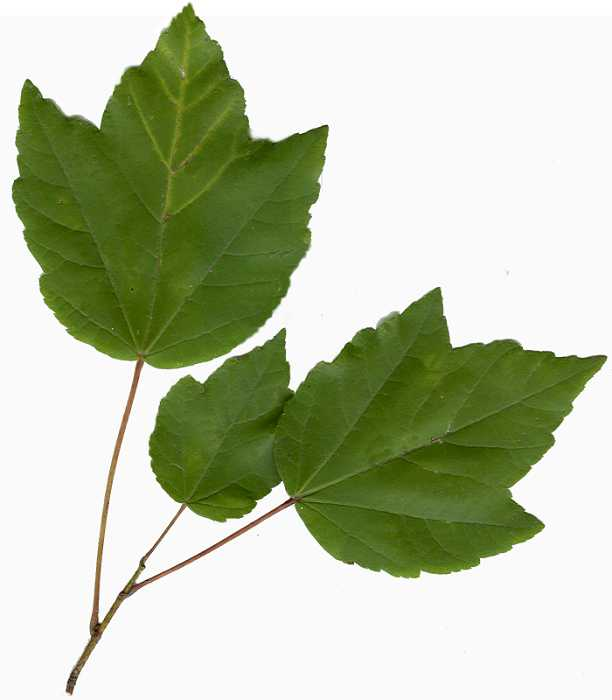
Leaves on a branchlet from a specimen in northern Florida

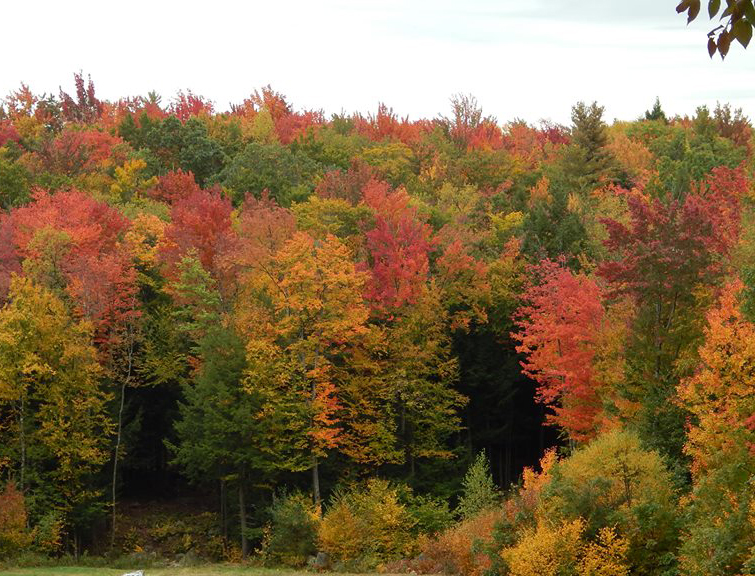
Fall foliage in red maple country

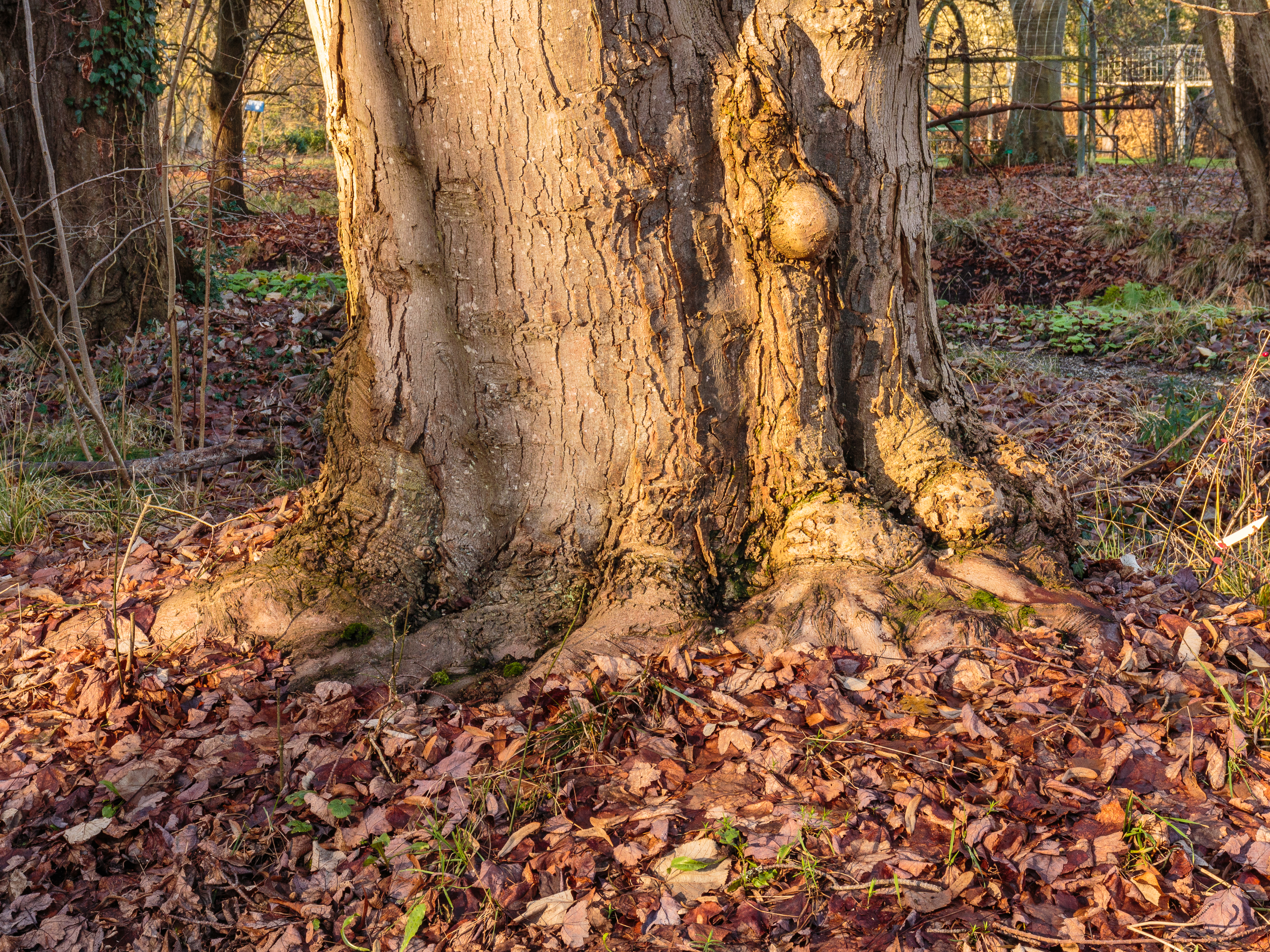
Base of trunk

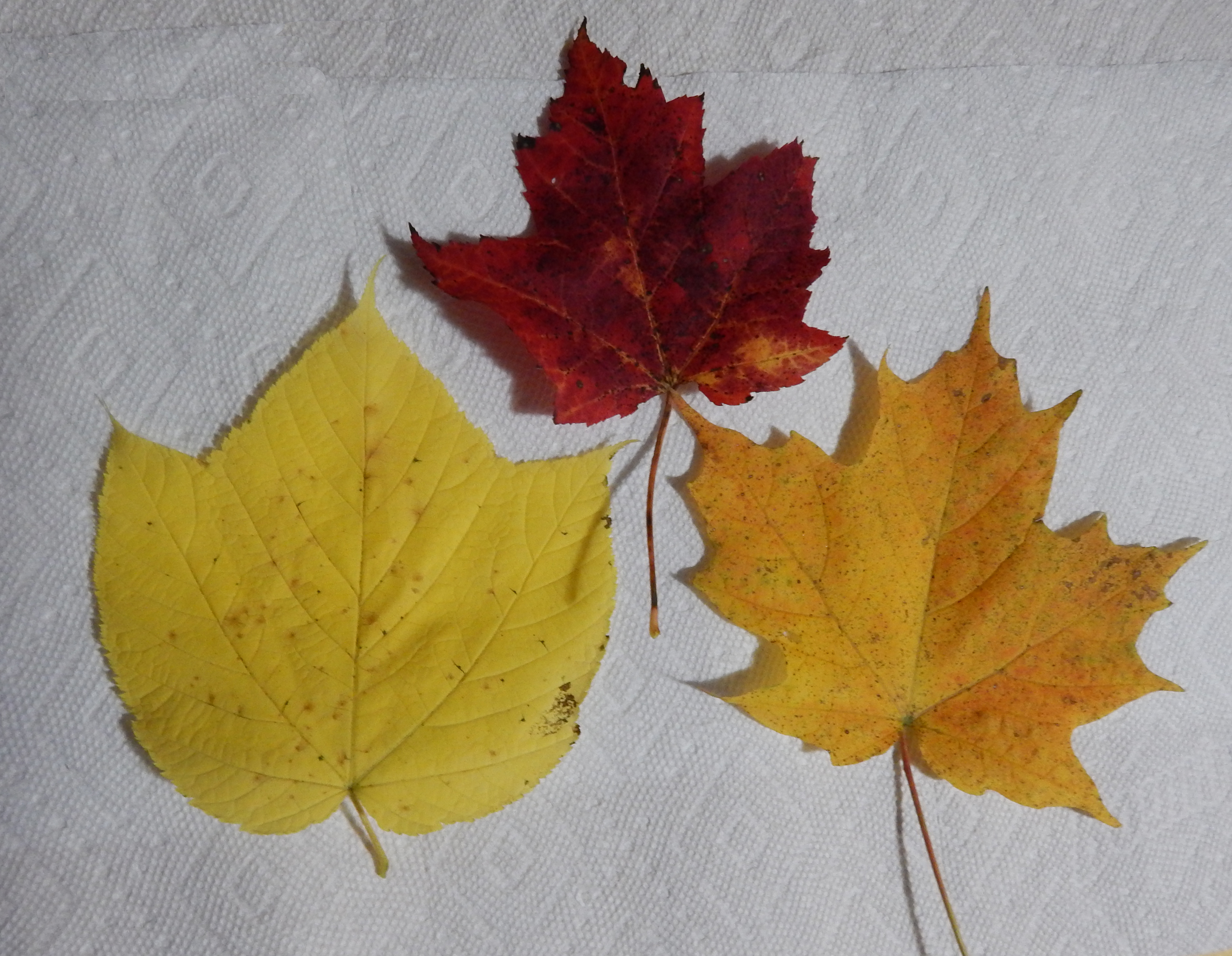
A. rubrum leaf in the autumn, top, compared to striped maple, which turns yellow, and sugar maple, which tends to orange

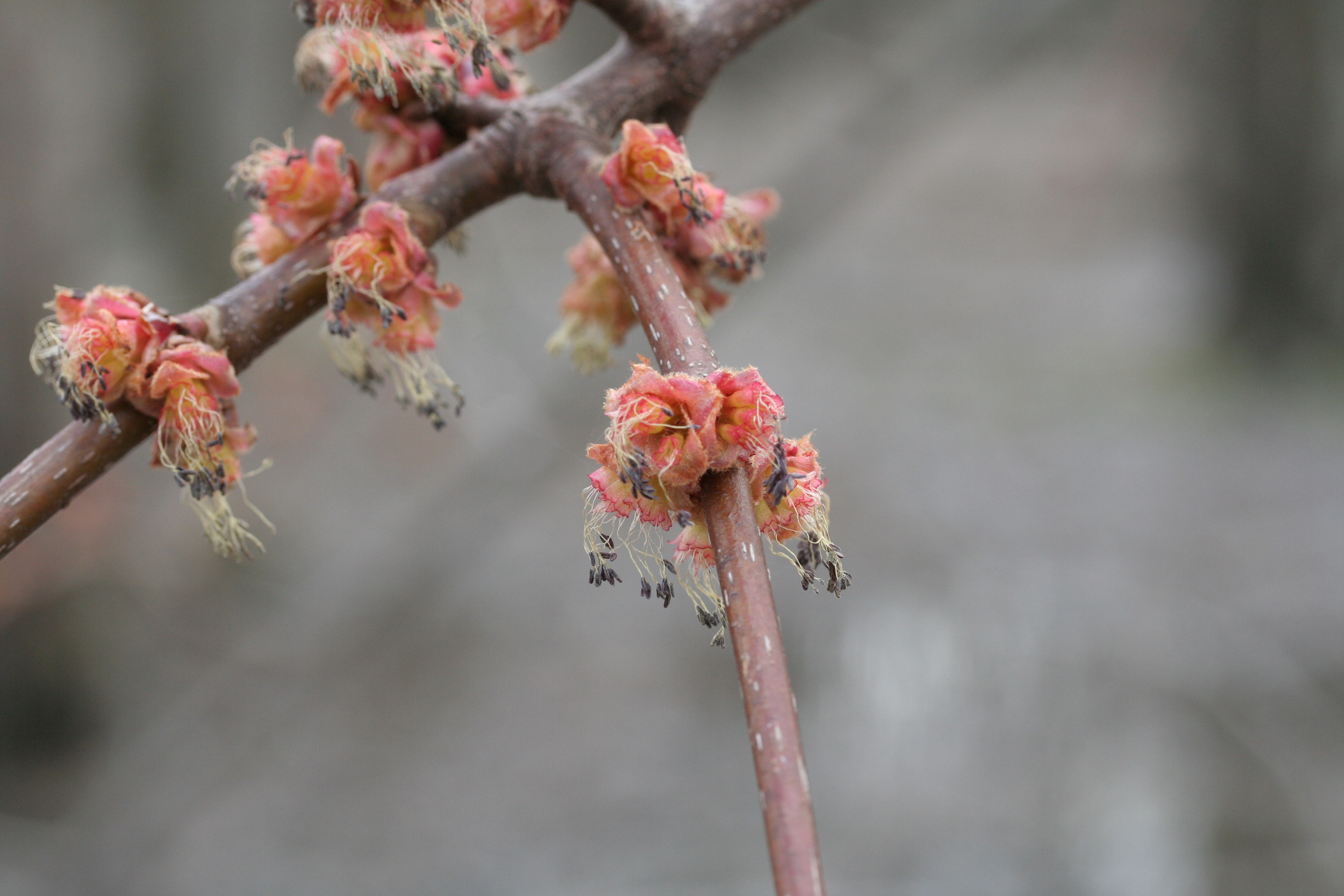
Acer rubrum, flowers, Quebec, Canada

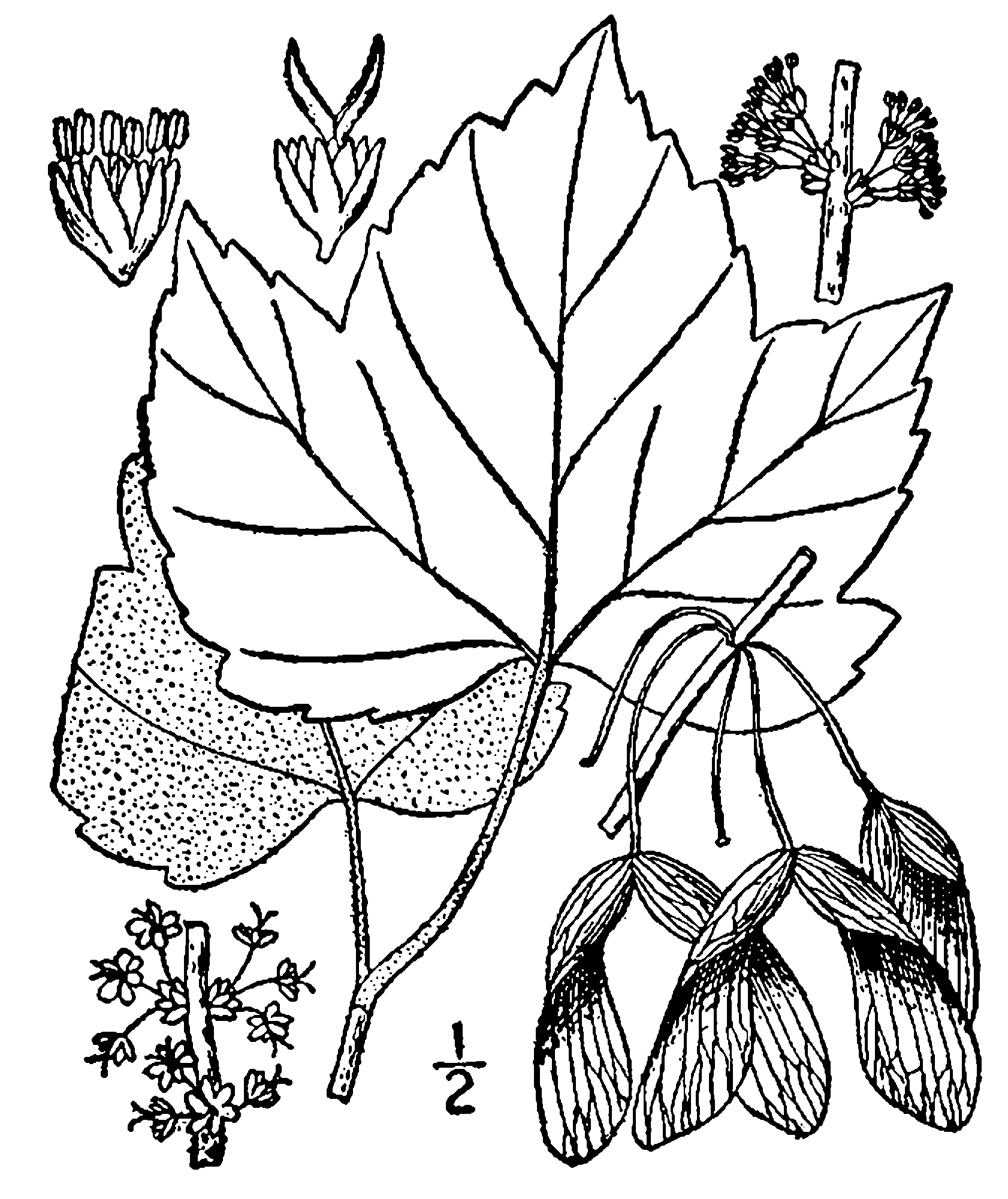
Drawing showing male and female flower, leaf and samara

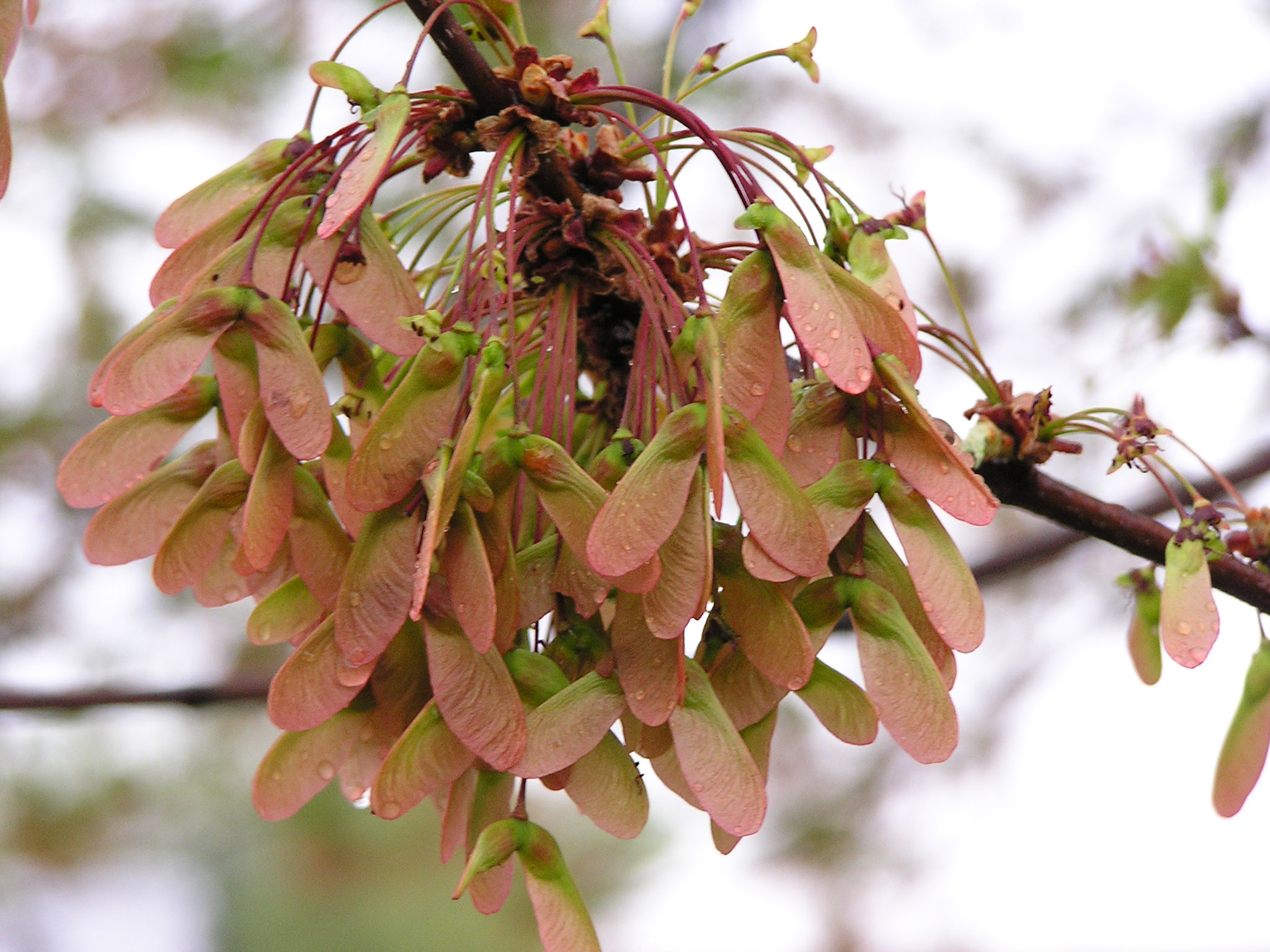
Samaras in Milford, New Hampshire

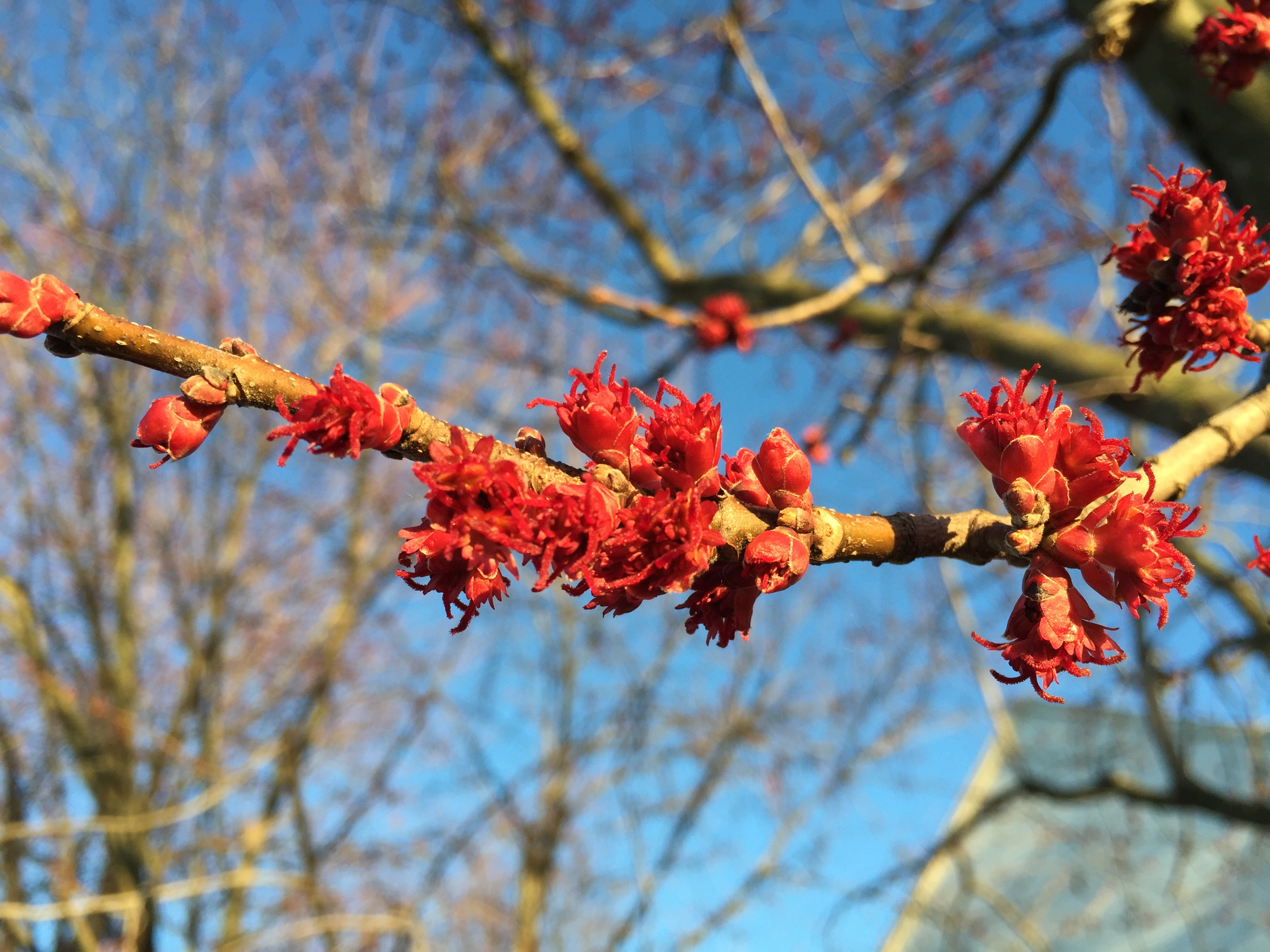
Female flowers with red pistils protruding

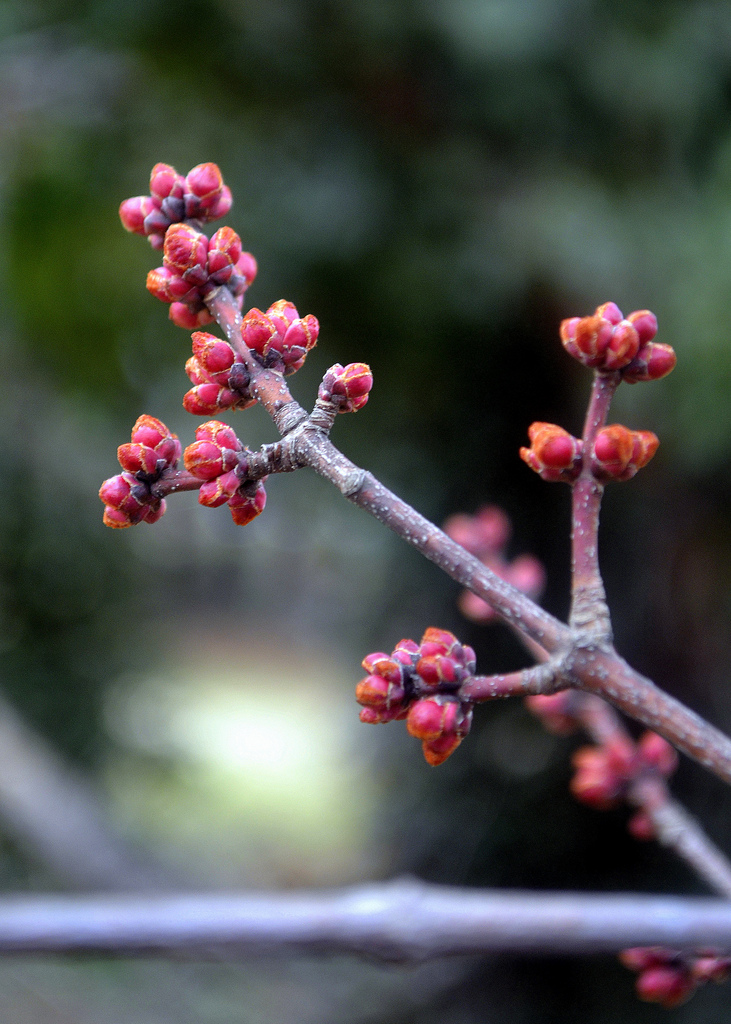
Flowerbuds in spring before blooming

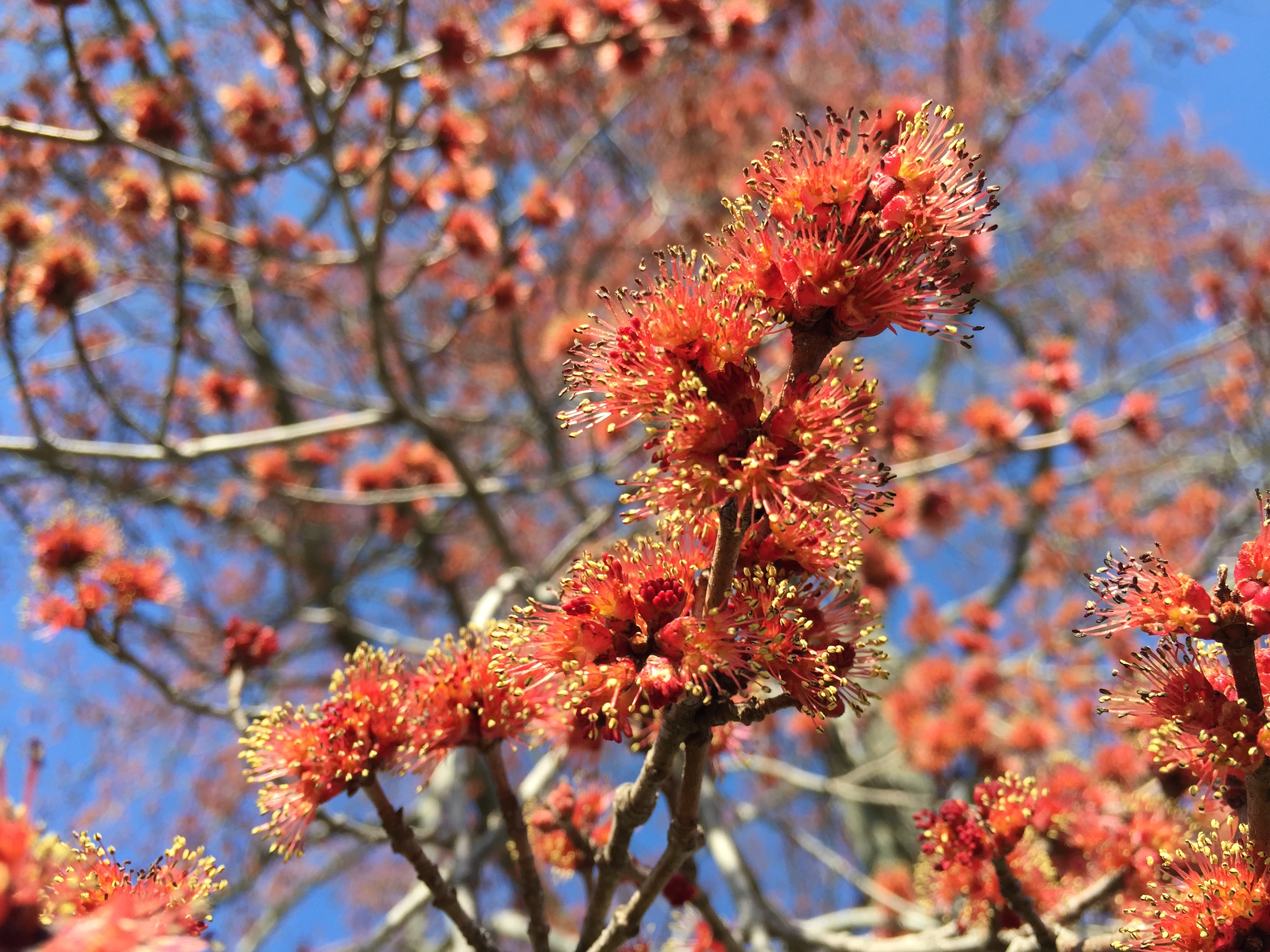
Male flowers

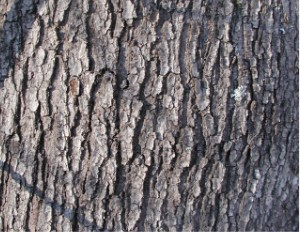
Mature bark, at Hemingway, South Carolina

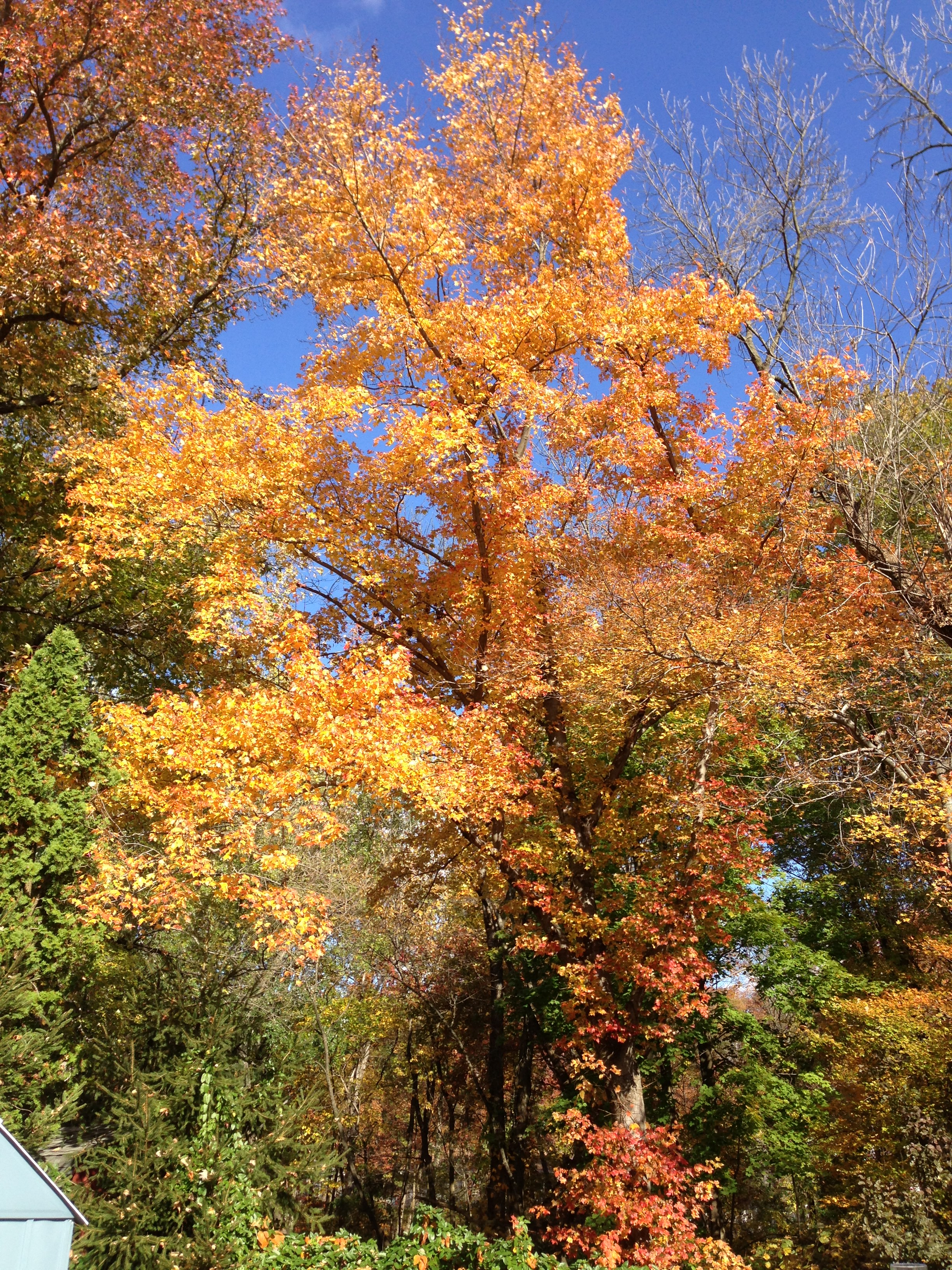
Variation of autumn coloration

== Distribution and habitat ==
Acer rubrum is one of the most abundant and most widespread trees in eastern North America. It can be found from the south of Newfoundland, through Nova Scotia, New Brunswick, and southern Quebec to the southwest west of Ontario, extreme southeastern Manitoba and northern Minnesota; southward through Wisconsin, Illinois, Missouri, eastern Oklahoma, and eastern Texas in its western range; and east to Florida. It has the largest continuous range along the North American Atlantic Coast of any tree that occurs in Florida. In total it ranges 2,600 km (1,600 mi) from north to south. The species is native to all regions of the United States east of the 95th meridian. The tree's range ends where the −40 °C (−40 °F) mean minimum isotherm begins, namely in southeastern Canada. A. rubrum is not present in most of the Prairie Peninsula of the northern Midwest (although it is found in Ohio), the coastal prairie in southern Louisiana and southeastern Texas and the swamp prairie of the Florida Everglades. Red maple's western range stops with the Great Plains where conditions become too dry for it. The absence of red maple from the Prairie Peninsula is most likely due to the tree's poor tolerance of wildfires. Red maple is most abundant in the Northeastern US, the Upper Peninsula of Michigan, and northeastern Wisconsin, and is rare in the extreme west of its range and in the Southeastern US.

In several other locations, the tree is absent from large areas but still present in a few specific habitats. An example is the Bluegrass region of Kentucky, where red maple is not found in the dominant open plains, but is present along streams. Here the red maple is not present in the bottom land forests of the Grain Belt, despite the fact it is common in similar habitats and species associations both to the north and south of this area. In the Northeastern US, red maple can be a climax forest species in certain locations, but will eventually give way to sugar maple.

A. rubrum does very well in a wide range of soil types, with varying textures, moisture, pH, and elevation, probably more so than any other forest tree in North America. Its wide pH tolerance means that it can grow in a variety of places, and it is widespread along the Eastern US. It grows on glaciated as well as unglaciated soils derived from granite, gneiss, schist, sandstone, shale, slate, conglomerate, quartzite, and limestone. Chlorosis can occur on very alkaline soils, though otherwise its pH tolerance is quite high. Moist mineral soil is best for germination of seeds.

Red maple can grow in a variety of moist and dry biomes, from dry ridges and sunny, southwest-facing slopes to peat bogs and swamps. While many types of tree prefer a south- or north-facing aspect, the red maple does not appear to have a preference. Its ideal conditions are in moderately well-drained, moist sites at low or intermediate elevations. However, it is nonetheless common in mountainous areas on relatively dry ridges, as well as on both the south and west sides of upper slopes. Furthermore, it is common in swampy areas, along the banks of slow moving streams, as well as on poorly drained flats and depressions. In northern Michigan and New England, the tree is found on the tops of ridges, sandy or rocky upland and otherwise dry soils, as well as in nearly pure stands on moist soils and the edges of swamps. In the far south of its range, it is almost exclusively associated with swamps. Additionally, red maple is one of the most drought-tolerant species of maple in the Carolinas.

Red maple is far more abundant today than when Europeans first arrived in North America. It only contributed minimally to old-growth upland forests, and would only form same-species stands in riparian zones. The density of the tree in many of these areas has increased six- to seven-fold, and this trend seems to be continuing. One of the primary factors for this appears to be a loss of forest management that comes in several forms. First, a loss regular prescribed burns, such as those performed by Native Americans who would use the burns to enhance acorn and other seed harvesting. Second, continued heavy logging and a recent trend of young, shrubby forests recovering from past human disturbances.

Because it can grow on a variety of substrates, has a wide pH tolerance, and grows in both shade and sun, A. rubrum is a prolific seed producer and highly adaptable, often dominating disturbed sites. While many believe that it is replacing historically dominant tree species in the Eastern US, such as sugar maples, beeches, oaks, hemlocks and pines, red maple will only dominate young forests prone to natural or human disturbance. In areas disturbed by humans where the species thrives, it can reduce diversity, but in a mature forest, it is not a dominant species; it only has a sparse presence and adds to the diversity and ecological structure of a forest. Extensive use of red maple in landscaping has contributed to the surge in the species' numbers as volunteer seedlings proliferate. Finally, disease epidemics have greatly reduced the population of elms and chestnuts in the forests of the US. While mainline forest trees continue to dominate mesic sites with rich soil, more marginal areas are increasingly being dominated by red maple.

In a mature or old-growth northern hardwood forest, red maple only has a sparse presence, while shade-tolerant trees such as sugar maples, beeches, and hemlocks thrive. The red maple can be considered weedy or even invasive in young, highly disturbed forests, especially frequently logged forests. By removing red maple from a young forest recovering from disturbance, the natural cycle of forest regeneration is altered, changing the diversity of the forest for centuries to come.

== Ecology ==
Red maple's maximum lifespan is 150 years, but most live less than 100 years. The tree's thin bark is easily damaged from ice and storms, animals, and when used in landscaping, being struck by flying debris from lawn mowers, allowing fungi to penetrate and cause heart rot. Its ability to thrive in a large number of habitats is largely due to its ability to produce roots to suit its site from a young age. In wet locations, red maple seedlings produce short taproots with long, well-developed lateral roots; while on dry sites, they develop long taproots with significantly shorter laterals. The roots are primarily horizontal, however, forming in the upper 25 cm (9.8 in) of the ground. Mature trees have woody roots up to 25 m (82 ft) long. They are very tolerant of flooding, with one study showing that 60 days of flooding caused no leaf damage. At the same time, they are tolerant of drought due to their ability to stop growing under dry conditions, and then producing a second-growth flush when conditions improve, even if growth has stopped for 2 weeks.

A. rubrum is one of the first plants to flower in spring. A crop of seeds is generally produced every year with a bumper crop often occurring every second year. A single tree between 5 and 20 cm (2.0 and 7.9 in) in diameter can produce between 12,000 and 91,000 seeds in a season. A tree 30 cm (0.98 ft) in diameter was shown to produce nearly a million seeds. Red maple produces one of the smallest seeds of any of the maples.

The seeds are epigeal and tend to germinate in early summer shortly after they are released, assuming a small amount of light, moisture, and sufficient temperatures are present. If the seeds are densely shaded, then germination commonly does not occur until the next spring.

Red maple is able to increase its numbers significantly when associate trees are damaged by disease, cutting, or fire. One study found that six years after clearcutting a 3.4-hectare (8.4-acre) oak-hickory forest containing no red maples, the plot contained more than 2,200 red maple seedlings per hectare (900 per acre) taller than 1.4 m (4.6 ft). One of its associates, the black cherry (Prunus serotina), contains benzoic acid, which is a potential allelopathic inhibitor of red maple growth. Red maple is one of the first species to start stem elongation. In one study, stem elongation was one-half completed in 1 week, after which growth slowed and was 90% completed within only 54 days. In good light and moisture conditions, the seedlings can grow 30 cm (0.98 ft) in their first year and up to 60 cm (2.0 ft) each year for the next few years, making it a fast grower.

The red maple is a food plant of Lepidoptera (butterflies and moths) including larvae of the rosy maple moth (Dryocampa rubicunda). The maple shoot borer, Proteoteras aesculana, is a serious pest of maples being raised in cultivation. The caterpillars tunnel into the shoots, weakening them; if a central shoot dies, the tree forks, though one of the branches may take over as the leading shoot.

Due to the species' very wide range, there is significant variation in hardiness, size, form, time of flushing, onset of dormancy, and other traits. Generally speaking, individuals from the north flush the earliest, have the most reddish fall color, set their buds the earliest and take the least winter injury. Seedlings are tallest in the north-central and east-central part of the range. In Florida, at the extreme south of the red maple's range, it is limited exclusively to swamplands. The fruits vary geographically with northern individuals in areas with brief, frost-free periods producing fruits that are shorter and heavier than their southern counterparts. As a result of such variation, there is much genetic potential for breeding programs with a goal of producing red maples for cultivation. This is especially useful for making urban cultivars that require resistance from verticillium wilt, air pollution, and drought.

Red maple frequently hybridizes with silver maple; the hybrid, known as Freeman's maple, Acer × freemanii, is intermediate between the parents.

=== Allergenic potential ===
The allergenic potential of red maples varies widely based on the cultivar. The following cultivars are completely male and are highly allergenic, with an OPALS allergy scale rating of 8 or higher:

- 'Autumn Flame' ('Flame')
- 'Autumn Spire'
- 'Columnare' ('Pyramidale')
- 'Firedance' ('Landsburg')
- 'Karpick'
- 'Northwood'
- 'October Brilliance'
- 'Sun Valley'
- 'Tiliford'

The following cultivars have an OPALS allergy scale rating of 3 or lower; they are completely female trees, and have low potential for causing allergies:

- 'Autumn Glory'
- 'Bowhall'
- 'Davey Red'
- 'Doric'
- 'Embers'
- 'Festival'
- 'October Glory'
- 'Red Skin'
- 'Red Sunset' ('Franksred')

=== Toxicity ===
The leaves of red maple, especially when dead or wilted, are extremely toxic to horses. The toxin is unknown, but believed to be an oxidant because it damages red blood cells, causing acute oxidative hemolysis that inhibits the transport of oxygen. This decreases oxygen delivery to all tissues, and leads to the production of methemoglobin, which can further damage the kidneys. The ingestion of 700 grams (1.5 pounds) of leaves is considered toxic and 1.4 kilograms (3 pounds) is lethal. Symptoms occur within one or two days after ingestion and can include depression, lethargy, increased rate and depth of breathing, increased heart rate, jaundice, dark brown urine, colic, laminitis, coma, and death. Treatment is limited and can include the use of methylene blue or mineral oil and activated carbon to stop further absorption of the toxin into the stomach, as well as blood transfusions, fluid support, diuretics, and anti-oxidants such as Vitamin C. About 50% to 75% of affected horses die or are euthanized as a result.

== Cultivation ==
Red maple's rapid growth, ease of transplanting, attractive form, and value for wildlife (in the eastern US) has made it one of the most extensively planted trees. In parts of the Pacific Northwest, it is one of the most common introduced trees. Its popularity in cultivation stems from its vigorous habit, its attractive and early red flowers, and most importantly, its flaming red fall foliage. The tree was introduced into the United Kingdom in 1656 and shortly thereafter entered cultivation. There it is frequently found in many parks and yards.

Red maple is a good choice of a tree for urban areas when there is ample room for its root system. Forming an association with arbuscular mycorrhizal fungi can help A. rubrum grow along city streets. It is more tolerant of pollution and road salt than sugar maples, although the tree's fall foliage is not as vibrant in this environment. Like several other maples, its low root system can be invasive and it makes a poor choice for plantings near paving. It attracts squirrels, who eat its buds in the early spring, although squirrels prefer the larger buds of the silver maple.

Red maples have attributes that make them conducive to bonsai, and have year-round features that make them frequent display trees.

=== Cultivars ===
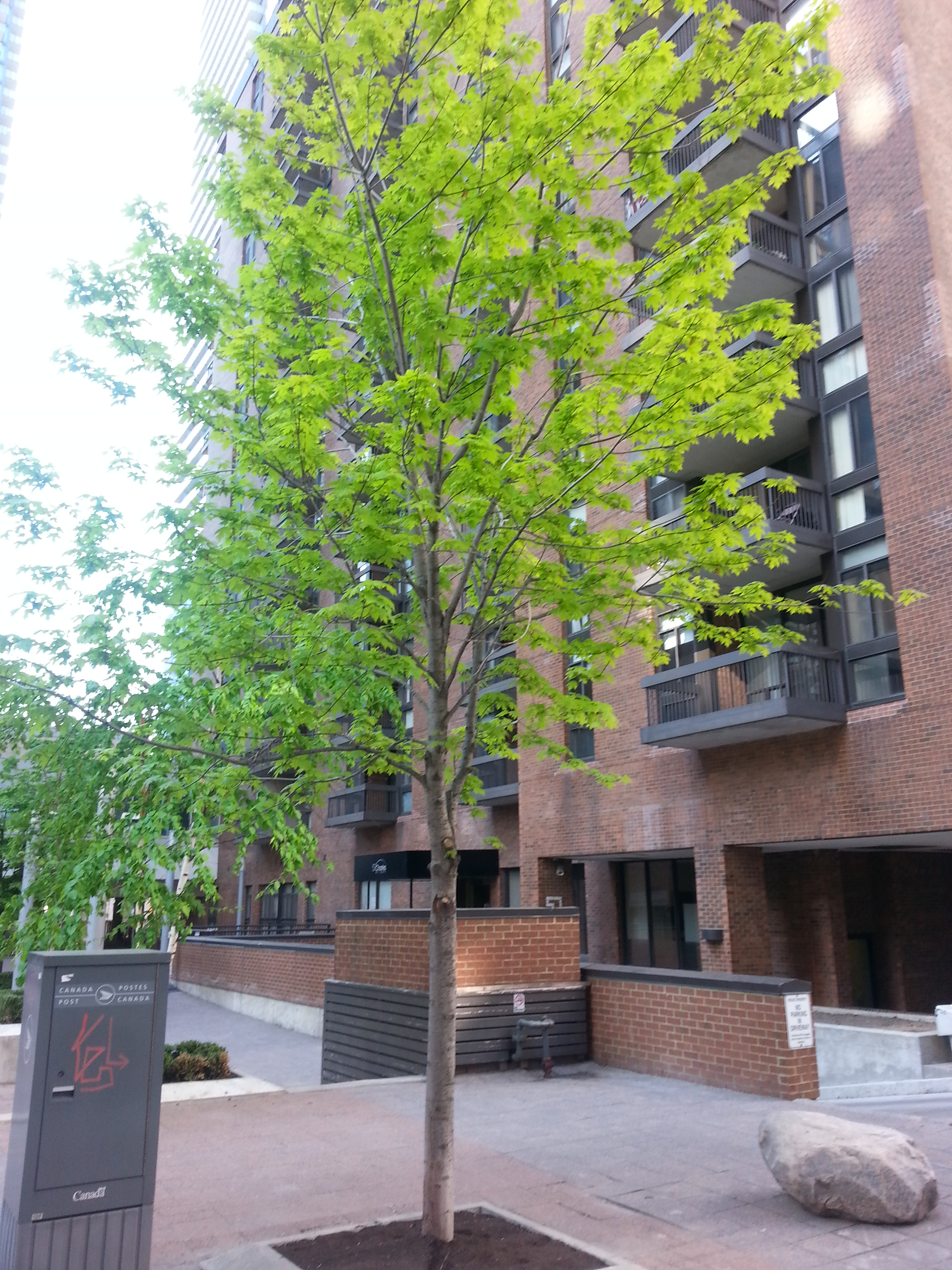
Acer × freemanii 'Jeffersred' cultivar in Toronto

Numerous cultivars have been selected, often for intensity of fall color, with 'October Glory' and 'Red Sunset' among the most popular. Toward its southern limit, 'Fireburst', 'Florida Flame', and 'Gulf Ember' are preferred. Many cultivars of the Freeman maple are also grown widely. Below is a partial list of cultivars:

- 'Armstrong' – Columnar to fastigate in shape with silvery bark and modest orange to red fall foliage.
- 'Autumn Blaze' – Rounded oval form with leaves that resemble the silver maple. The fall color is orange red and persists longer than usual.
- 'Autumn Flame' – A fast grower with exceptional bright red fall color developing early. The leaves are also smaller than the species.
- 'Autumn Radiance' – Dense oval crown with an orange-red fall color.
- 'Autumn Spire' – Broad columnar crown; red fall color; very hardy.
- 'Bowhall' – Conical to upright in form with a yellow-red fall color.
- 'Burgundy Bell' – Compact rounded uniform shape with long lasting, burgundy fall leaves.
- 'Columnare' – An old cultivar growing to 20 metres (66 feet) with a narrow columnar to pyramidal form with dark green leaves turning orange and deep red in fall.
- 'Gerling' – A compact, slow growing selection, this individual only reaches 10 metres (33 feet) and has orange-red fall foliage.
- 'Northwood' – Branches are at a 45 degree angle to the trunk, forming a rounded oval crown. Though the foliage is deep green in summer, its orange-red fall color is not as impressive as other cultivars.
- 'October Brilliance' – This selection is slow to leaf in spring, but has a tight crown and deep red fall color.
- 'October Glory' – Has a rounded oval crown with late developing intense red fall foliage. Along with 'Red Sunset', it is the most popular selection due to the dependable fall color and vigorous growth. This cultivar has gained the Royal Horticultural Society's Award of Garden Merit.
- 'Redpointe' – Superior in alkaline soil, strong central leader, red fall color.
- 'Red Sunset' – is also a recipient of the Award of Garden Merit. The other very popular choice, this selection does well in heat due to its drought tolerance and has an upright habit. It has very attractive orange-red fall color and is also a rapid and vigorous grower.
- 'Scarlet Sentinel' – A columnar to oval selection with 5-lobed leaves resembling the silver maple. The fall color is yellow-orange to orange-red and the tree is a fast grower.
- 'Schlesingeri' – A tree with a broad crown and early, long lasting fall color that is a deep red to reddish purple. Growth is also quite rapid. The original tree grew at the home of Barthold Schlesinger in Brookline, Massachusetts.
- 'Shade King' – This fast growing cultivar has an upright-oval form with deep green summer leaves that turn red to orange in fall.
- 'V.J. Drake' – This selection is notable because the edges of the leaves first turn a deep red before the color progresses into the centre.

== Other uses ==
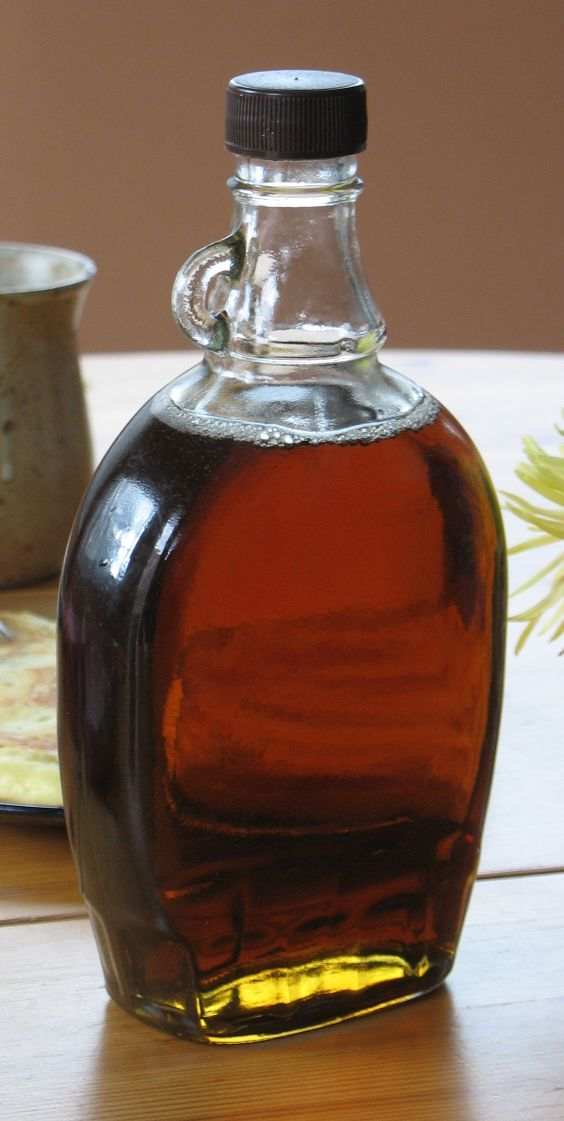
Red maple may be used for syrup, but its short harvest season reduces its commercial viability.

In the lumber industry Acer rubrum is considered a "soft maple", a designation it shares, commercially, with its cousin silver maple (A. saccharinum). In this context, the term "soft" is more comparative than descriptive; i.e., "soft maple", while softer than sugar maple, is still a fairly hard wood, being comparable to black cherry (Prunus serotina). Like A. saccharum, the wood of red maple is close-grained, but its texture is softer, less dense, and has not as desirable an appearance, particularly under a clear finish. However, the wood from A. rubrum while being typically less expensive than hard maple, has greater dimensional stability than that of A. saccharum, and machines and stains more readily. Thus, high grades of wood from the red maple can be substituted for hard maple, particularly when it comes to making stain/paint-grade furniture. Red maple lumber contains a greater percentage of "curly" (aka "flame"/"fiddleback") figure, prized by musical instrument/custom furniture makers, as well as the veneer industry. As a soft maple, the wood tends to shrink more during the drying process than with the hard maples.

Red maple is used for the production of maple syrup, though the hard maples A. saccharum (sugar maple) and A. nigrum (black maple) are more commonly utilized. One study compared the sap and syrup from the sugar maple with those of the red maple, as well as those of the A. saccharinum (silver maple), A. negundo (boxelder), and A. platanoides (Norway maple), and all were found to be equal in sweetness, flavour, and quality. However, the buds of red maple and other soft maples emerge much earlier in the spring than the sugar maple, and after sprouting, chemical makeup of the sap changes, imparting an undesirable flavour to the syrup. This being the case, red maple can only be tapped for syrup before the buds emerge, making the season very short.

Native Americans used red maple bark as a wash for inflamed eyes and cataracts, and as a remedy for hives and muscular aches. They brewed tea from the inner bark to treat coughs and diarrhea. Pioneers made cinnamon-brown and black dyes from a bark extract, and iron sulphate could be added to the tannin from red maple bark in order to make ink.

== In culture ==
It is the state tree of Rhode Island.

== See also ==
- List of plants poisonous to equines
- List of foods made from maple
