= Prairie Peninsula =

Ecological area in North America

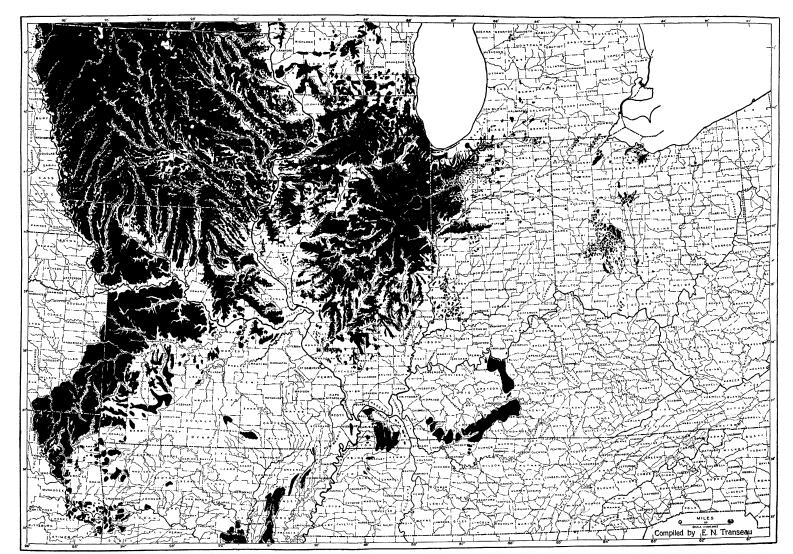
Extent of the Prairie Peninsula as mapped in 1935

The Prairie Peninsula is an eastward projection of vegetation typically found in the American prairies into Wisconsin, Illinois, Indiana, and Ohio. It is so named because it is an extension of grassland into the forests of the eastern United States.

Anthropogenic fire regimes are considered to have helped maintain the eastern prairies. The Prairie Peninsula is considered an endangered ecosystem. Through human settlement and farming, the peninsula has become heavily fragmented.

== History ==
The Prairie Peninsula was mostly forested during the early Holocene. Prairie species began to thrive as aridity in the region increased between 10,000 and 8,500 years ago, displacing trees such as elms, ashes, ironwoods, and sugar maples. Trees recolonized the area between 8,500 and 6,200 years ago, such as oaks and hickories. The prairie ecosystem became dominant again around 6,200 years ago, despite the climate being less arid than it was between 10,000 and 8,500 years ago.

It is hypothesized that the tallgrass prairie persisted through wildfires started by anthropogenic activity and by lightning. It has been theorized that the Native American use of fire in ecosystem management contributed to the formation and maintenance of the ecosystem. The formation of the peninsula is thought to be due to soil moisture retention that differs from the surrounding forests of the region. Deep soil moisture is not retained year-round, as the rates of evapotranspiration are high during the growing season. While shallow rooting grasses are less affected, tap-rooting trees are disadvantaged.

The area receives 750 to 1,200 mm (30 to 47 in) of precipitation annually. Periodic droughts, fire regimes, and browsing by elk and deer have contributed to the high mortality of colonizing tree saplings.
