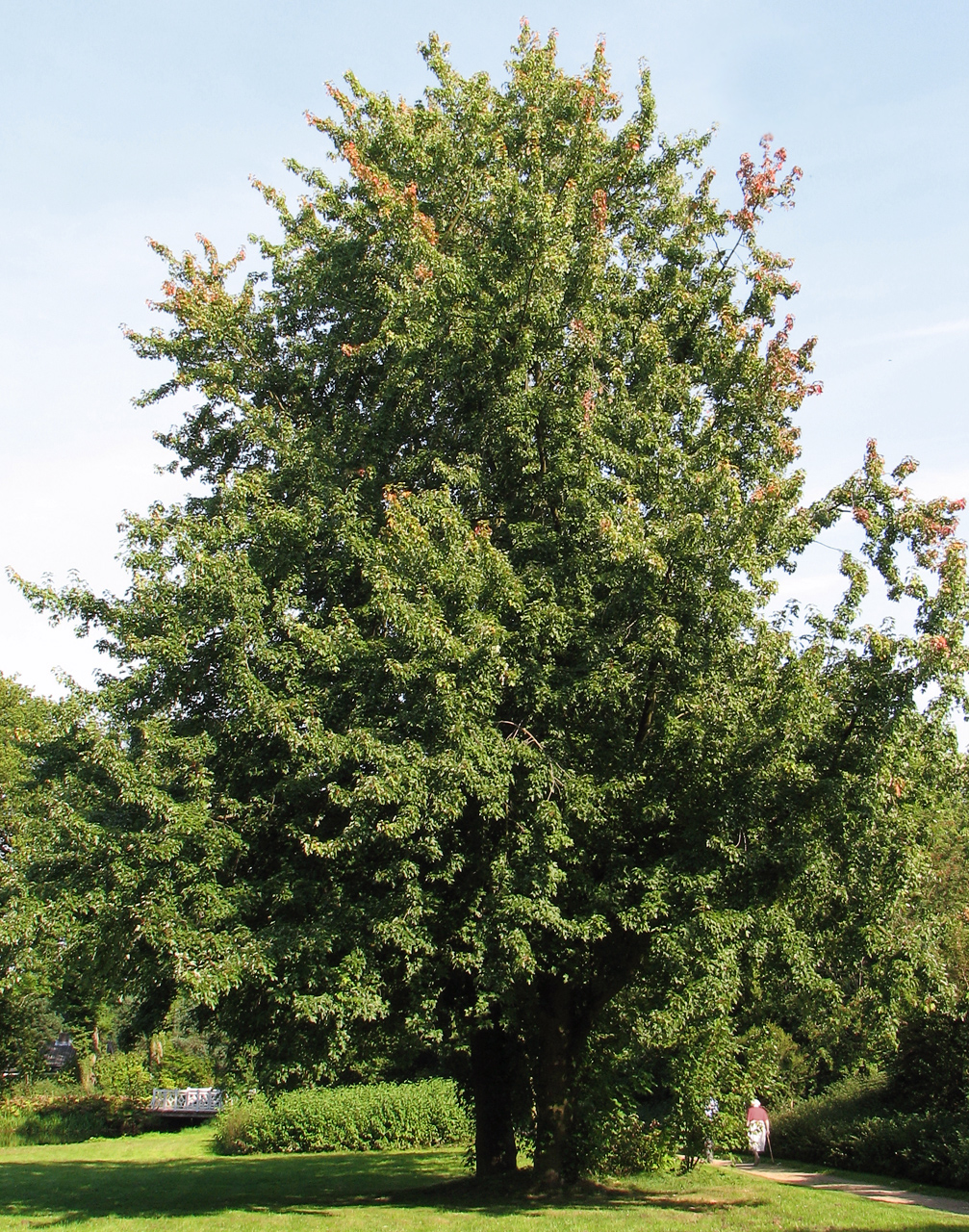

Conservation status
- Least Concern (IUCN 3.1)

Scientific classification
- Kingdom: Plantae
- Clade: Tracheophytes
- Clade: Angiosperms
- Clade: Eudicots
- Clade: Rosids
- Order: Sapindales
- Family: Sapindaceae
- Genus: Acer
- Section: Acer sect. Rubra
- Species: A. saccharinum

Binomial name
- Acer saccharinum L. 1753
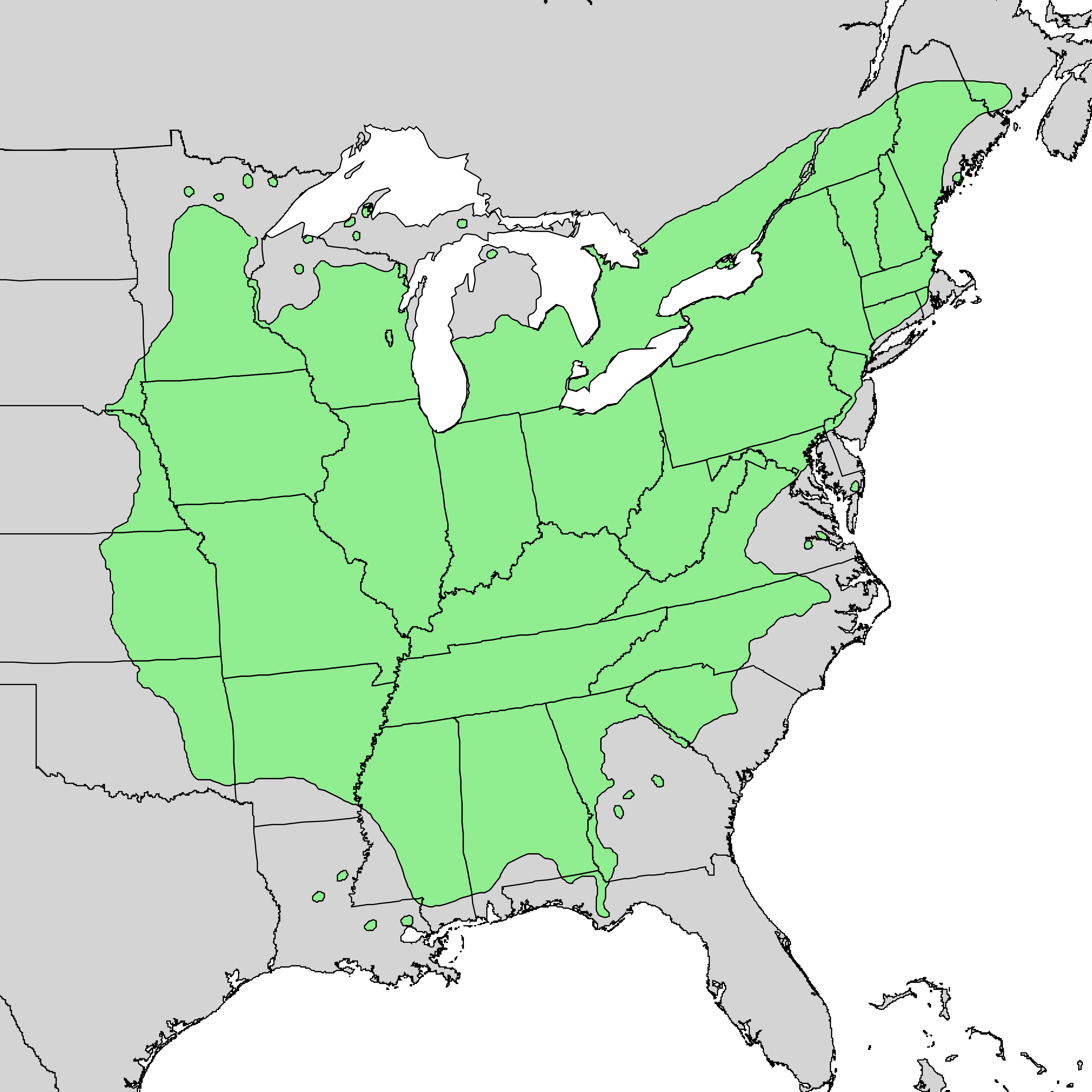
- Natural range of Acer saccharinum

Synonyms
- List: Acer coccineum Wender. 1831 not F. Michx. 1817; Acer dasycarpum Ehrh.; Acer eriocarpum Michx.; Acer pavia Dippel; Acer saira K.Koch; Acer tomentosum Desf.; Acer virginianum Mill. ex Steud.; Argentacer saccharinum (L.) Small; Saccharodendron saccharinum Nieuwl.; Sacchrosphendamnus saccharinus Nieuwl.

= Acer saccharinum =

Species of maple tree

Acer saccharinum, commonly known as silver maple, creek maple, silverleaf maple, soft maple, large maple, water maple, swamp maple, or white maple, is a species of maple native to the eastern and central United States and southeastern Canada. It is one of the most common trees in the United States.

Although the silver maple's Latin name is similar, it should not be confused with Acer saccharum, the sugar maple. Some of the common names are also applied to other maples, especially Acer rubrum.

== Description ==
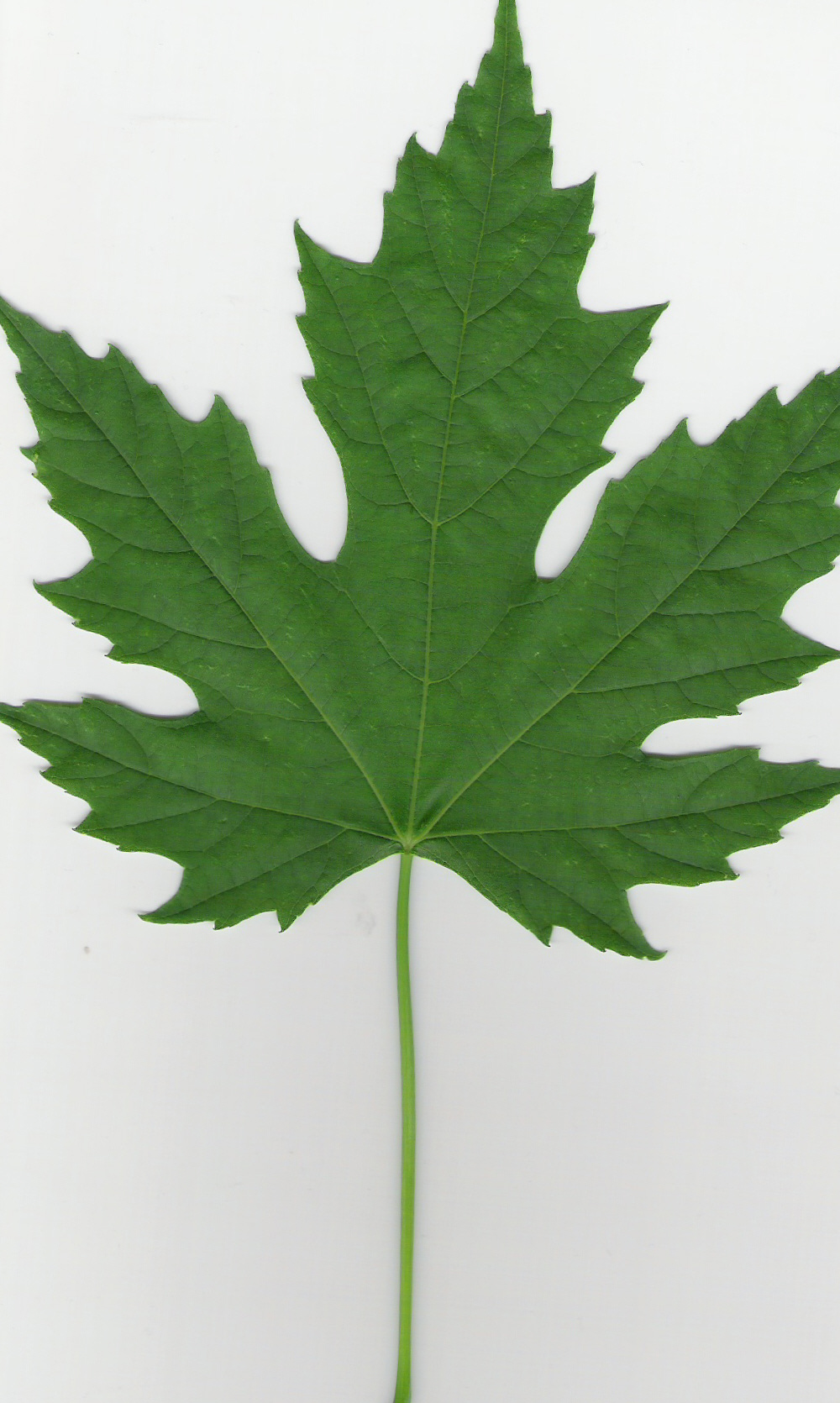
Mature leaf

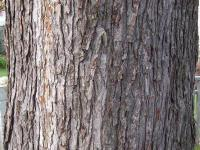
Typical bark

The silver maple tree is a relatively fast-growing deciduous tree, commonly reaching a height of 15–25 m (49–82 ft), exceptionally 35 m (115 ft). Its spread will generally be 11–15 m (36–49 ft) wide. A 10-year-old sapling will stand about 8 m (26 ft) tall. It is often found along waterways and in wetlands, leading to the colloquial name "water maple". It is a highly adaptable tree, although it has higher sunlight requirements than other maple trees. The leaves are simple and palmately veined, 8–16 cm (3 1/4–6 1/4 in) long and 6–12 cm (2 1/4–4 3/4 in) broad, with deep angular notches between the five lobes. The 5–12 cm (2–4 3/4 in) long, slender stalks of the leaves mean that even a light breeze can produce a striking effect as the downy silver undersides of the leaves are exposed. The autumn color is less pronounced than in many maples, generally ending up a pale yellow, although some specimens can produce a more brilliant yellow and even orange and red colorations. The tree has a tendency to color and drop its leaves slightly earlier in autumn than other maples.

The flowers are in dense clusters, produced before the leaves in early spring, with the seeds maturing in early summer. The fruit is a schizocarp of two single-seeded, winged samaras. The wing of each samara is about 3–5 cm (1 1/4–2 in) long. The fruit of this species is the largest among the maples native to its range. Although the wings provide for some transport by air, the fruit are heavy and are also transported by water. Silver maple and its close cousin red maple are the only Acer species which produce their fruit crop in spring instead of fall. The seeds of both trees have no epigeal dormancy and will germinate immediately. Seed production begins at 11 years of age and large crops are produced most years. Like most maples, silver maple can be variably dioecious (separate male or female trees) or monoecious (male and female flowers on the same tree) but dioecious trees are far more common. They can also change sex from year to year.

On mature trunks, the bark is gray and shaggy. On branches and young trunks, the bark is smooth and silvery gray.

== Cultivation and uses ==
Wildlife uses the silver maple in various ways. In many parts of the eastern U.S., the large rounded buds are one of the primary food sources for squirrels during the spring, after many acorns and nuts have sprouted and the squirrels' food is scarce. The seeds are also a food source for chipmunks and birds. The bark can be eaten by beaver and deer. The trunks tend to produce cavities, which can shelter squirrels, raccoons, opossums, owls and woodpeckers, and are frequented by carpenter ants. Additionally, the leaves serve as a source of food for species of Lepidoptera, such as the rosy maple moth (Dryocampa rubicunda).

The wood can be used as pulp for making paper. Lumber from the tree is used in furniture, cabinets, flooring, musical instruments, crates, and tool handles, because it is light and easily worked. Because of the silver maple's fast growth, it is being researched as a potential source of biofuels. Silver maple produces a sweet sap but it is generally not used by commercial sugarmakers because its sugar content is lower than in other maple species.

Silver maple is often planted as an ornamental tree because of its rapid growth and ease of propagation and transplanting. It is highly tolerant of urban situations and is frequently planted next to streets. However, its quick growth produces brittle wood which is commonly damaged in storms. The silver maple's root system is shallow and fibrous and easily invades septic fields and old drain pipes; it can also crack sidewalks and foundations. It is a vigorous resprouter, and if not pruned, will often grow with multiple trunks. Although it naturally is found near water, it can grow on drier ground if planted there. In ideal natural conditions, A. saccharinum may live up to 130 years but in urban environments often 80 or less.

Following World War II, silver maples were commonly used as a landscaping and street tree in suburban housing developments and cities due to their rapid growth, especially as a replacement for the blighted American elm. However, they fell out of favor for this purpose because of brittle wood, unattractive form when not pruned or trained, and tendency to produce large numbers of volunteer seedlings. Today the tree has fallen so far out of favor that some towns and cities have banned its use as a street tree.

Silver maple's natural range encompasses most of the eastern US, the Midwestern US and southern Canada, that being Southern Ontario and southwestern Quebec. It is generally absent from the humid US coastal plain south of Maryland, so it is confined to the Appalachians in those states. It does not occur along the Gulf Coast or in Florida outside a few scattered locations in the panhandle.

It is commonly cultivated outside its native range, showing tolerance of a wide range of climates, and growing successfully as far north as central Norway. It also is in Anchorage, Alaska. It can thrive in a Mediterranean climate, as at Jerusalem and Los Angeles, if summer water is provided.

The silver maple is closely related to the red maple (Acer rubrum) and can hybridise with it. The hybrid is known as the Freeman maple (Acer × freemanii). The Freeman maple is used as an ornamental tree in parks and large gardens, combining the fast growth of silver maple with the less brittle wood, less invasive roots, and the bright red fall foliage of the red maple. The cultivar Acer × freemanii Autumn Blaze = 'Jeffersred' has gained the Royal Horticultural Society's Award of Garden Merit.

The silver maple is the favored host of the maple bladder gall mite Vasates quadripedes.

=== Native American ethnobotany ===
Native Americans used the sap of wild trees to make sugar, as medicine, and in bread. They used the wood to make baskets and furniture. An infusion of bark removed from the south side of the tree is used by the Mohegan as cough medicine. The Cherokee take an infusion of the bark to treat cramps, menstrual pains, dysentery, and hives. They boil the inner bark and use it with water as a wash for sore eyes. They take a hot infusion of the bark to treat measles. They use the tree to make baskets, for lumber, building material, and for carving.

== Photo gallery ==
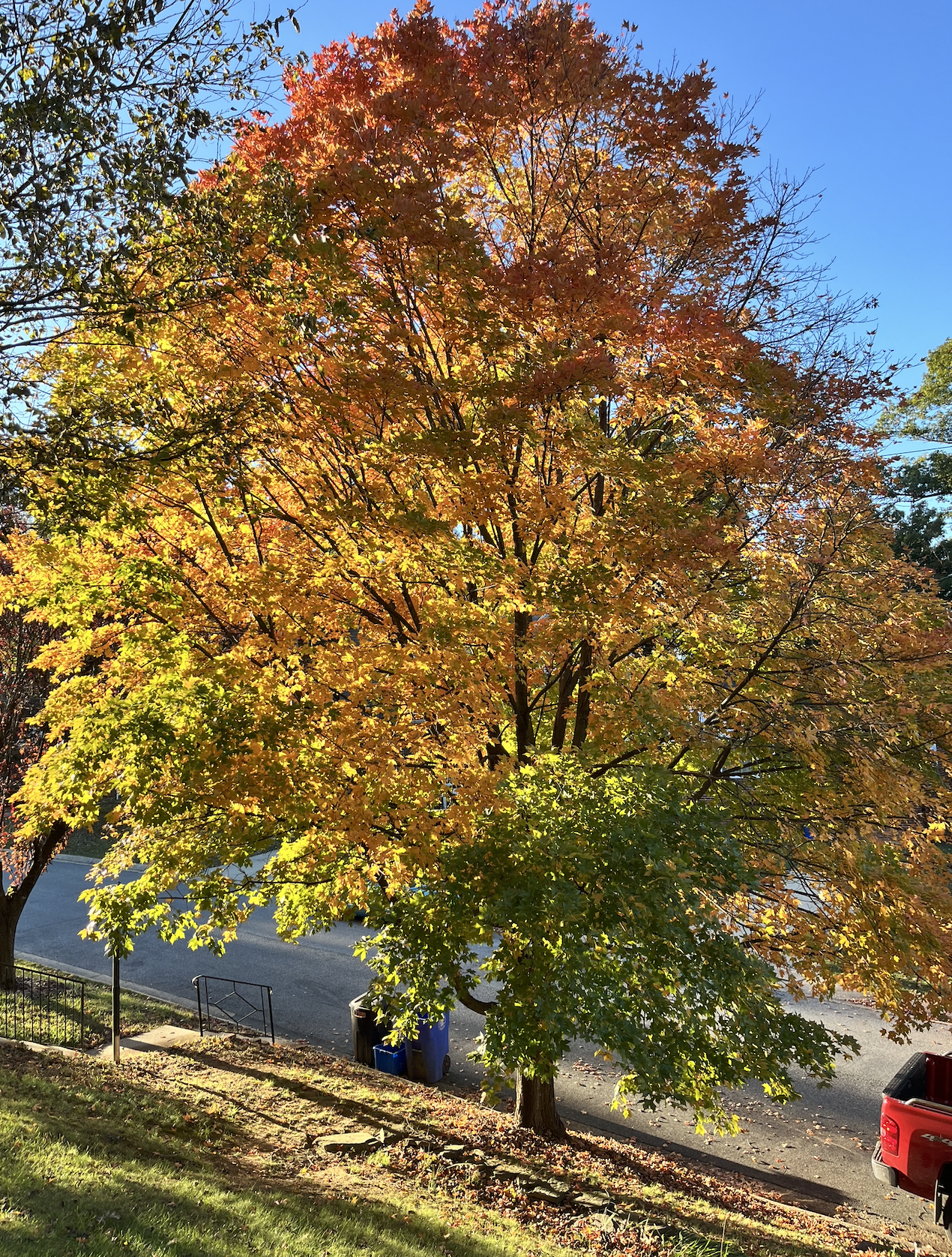
A silver maple showing typical fall foliage Woodmoor, Maryland

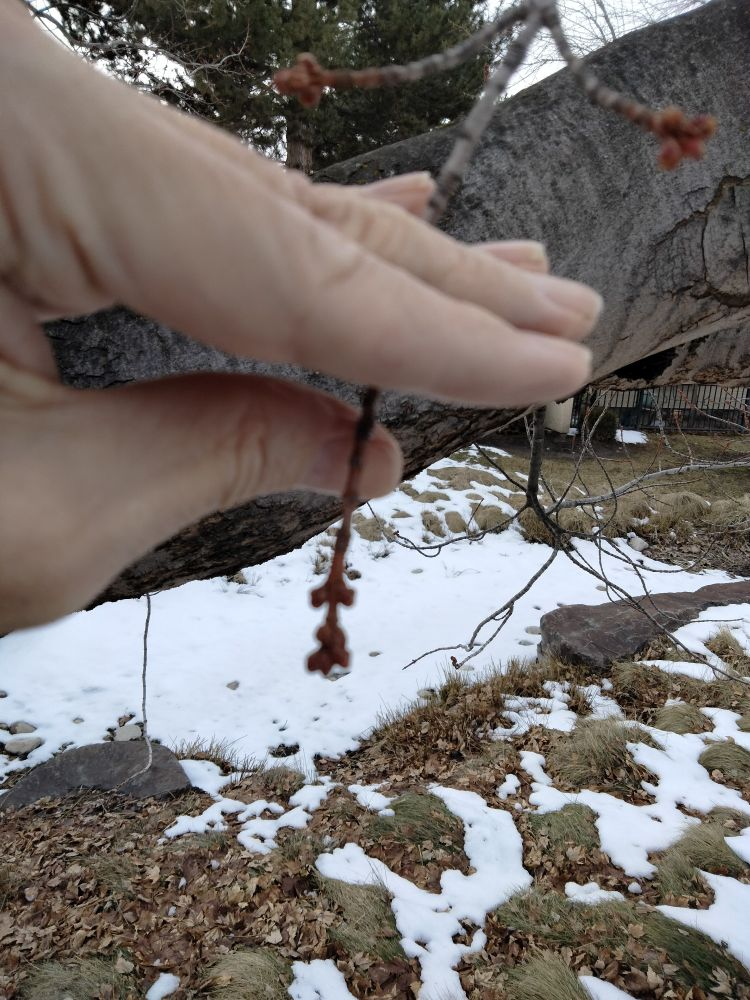
A silver maple just beginning to bud in mid-February, Boise, Idaho

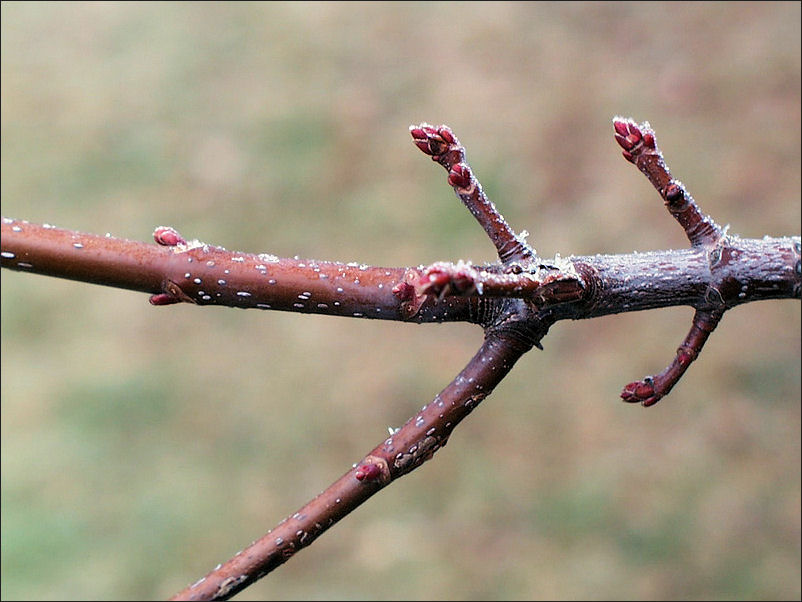
Twig and buds in early March

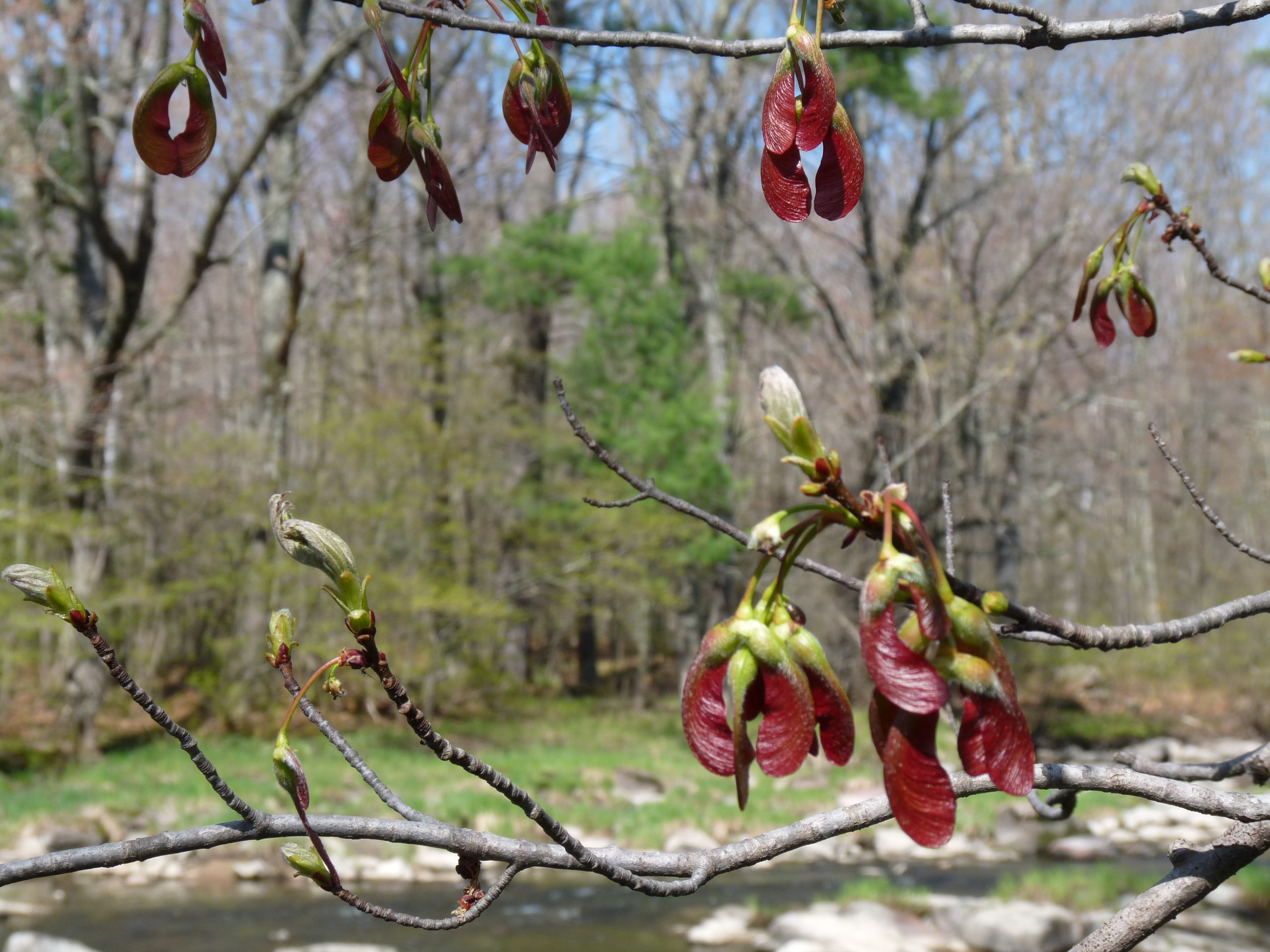
Samaras and leaves forming in April

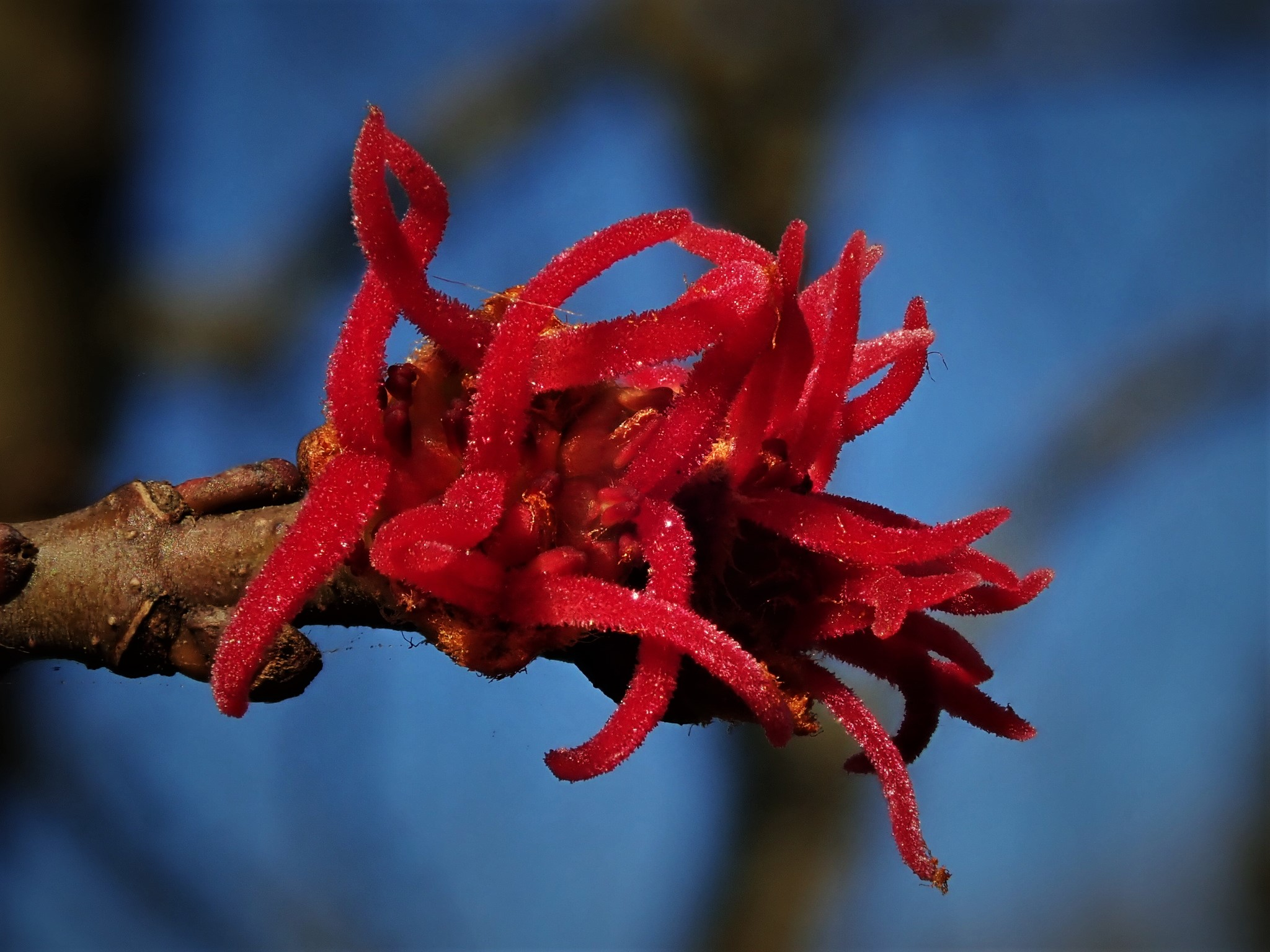
Female flowers

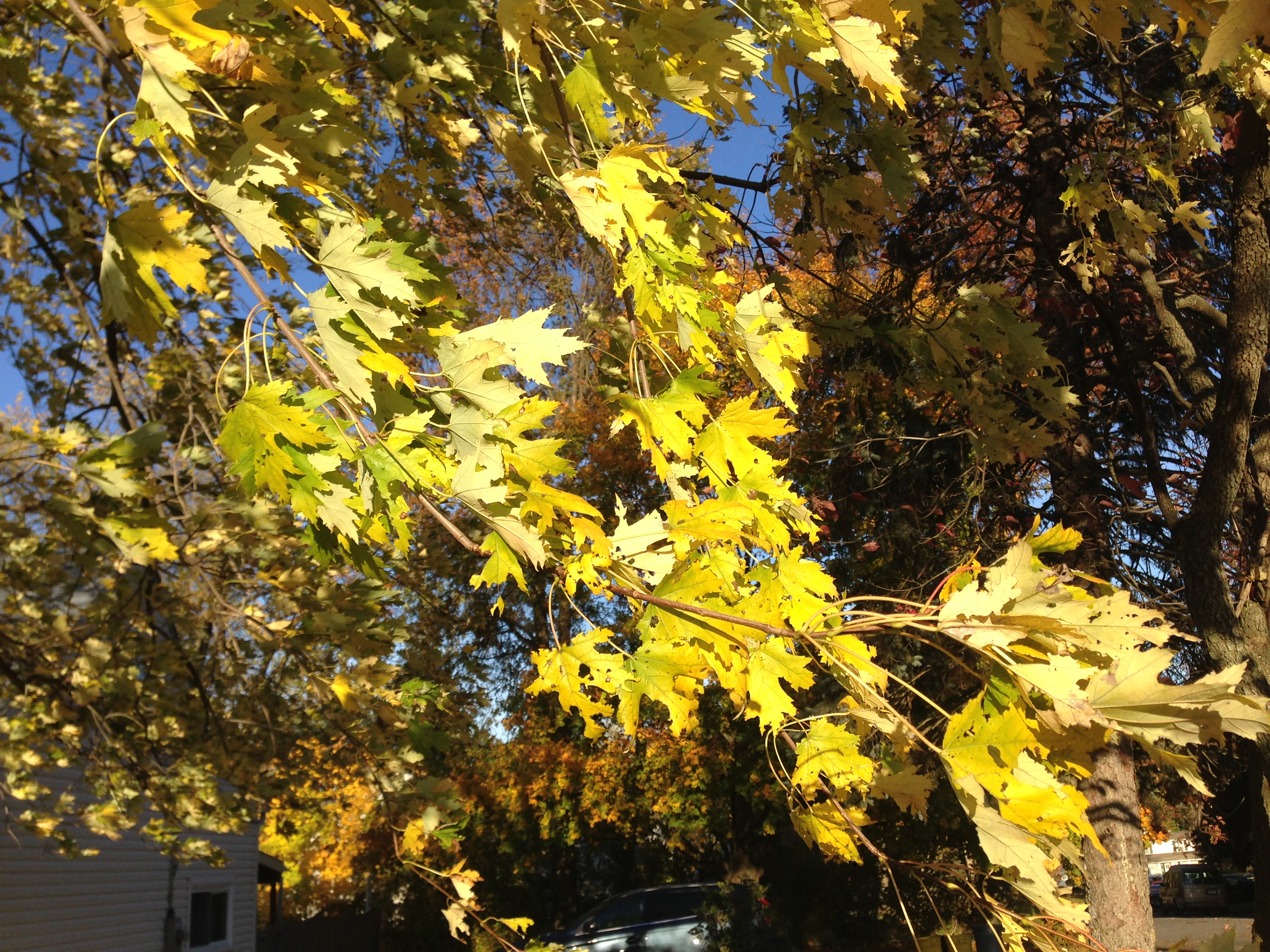
Autumnal foliage, Ewing, New Jersey
