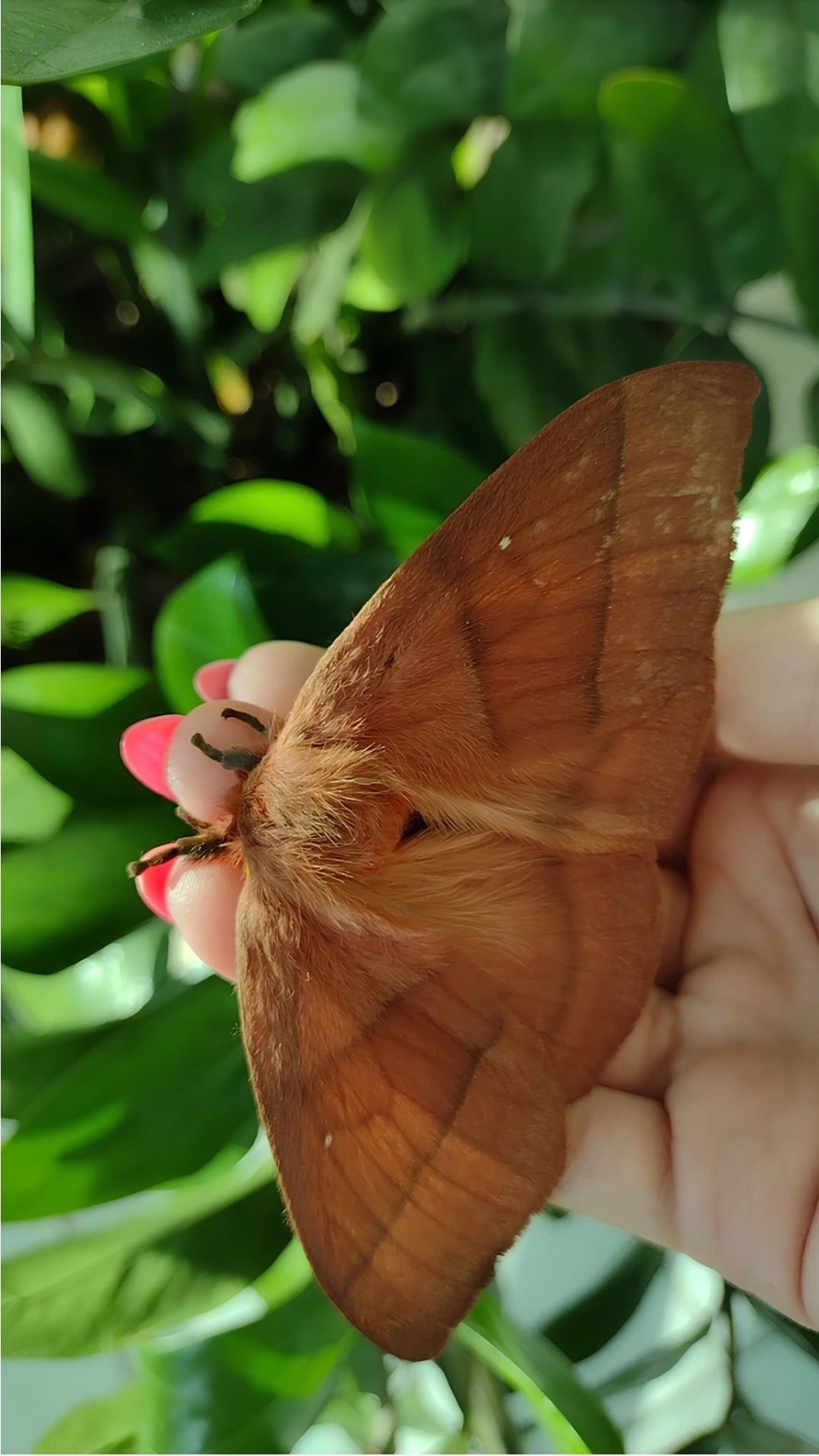
- In Fortaleza, Ceará, Brazil

Scientific classification
- Kingdom: Animalia
- Phylum: Arthropoda
- Class: Insecta
- Order: Lepidoptera
- Family: Saturniidae
- Genus: Dirphia
- Species: D. rubricauda

Binomial name
- Dirphia rubricauda Bouvier, 1929

= Mars Moth =

Species of moth

Dirphia rubricauda, commonly known as the Mars moth or red-tailed moth, is a large species of moth in the family Saturniidae, the same family as the giant silk moths. Described by Eugène Louis Bouvier in 1929, it is mainly recognized by the bright red tails on its hindwings and the urticating hairs of its caterpillars. It is primarily found in the Cerrado biome of Brazil and adjacent regions of South America.

== Distribution ==
D. rubricauda is distributed across tropical and subtropical South America, especially in Brazil. Within Brazil, it is more commonly found in the Cerrado biome, especially in the states of Goiás, the Federal District, and Tocantins. There are also confirmed records from Ceará and Piauí (Northeast) and transitional areas in Minas Gerais (Southeast).

Outside Brazil, it has been recorded in the Concepción department of Paraguay.

== Description ==
Adults have a wingspan of 6–9 cm. The forewings are rust-colored to reddish-brown, often with coppery or reddish reflections. Hindwings feature bright red to orange-red tails, a defining trait of the species (rubricauda = "red tail"). Males have bipectinate antennae for detecting female pheromones; females' antennae are less branched. Mouthparts are vestigial, and adults do not feed.

Larvae are greenish-yellow and covered in urticating hairs arranged in rings. These hairs are connected to glands that release toxins when broken.

== Life cycle ==
The species undergoes complete metamorphosis: egg, larva, pupa, and adult. Eggs are laid in clusters under host leaves and hatch in 8–15 days. Larvae go through 5–6 instars and feed on native plants, including Fabaceae, Myrtaceae, and Rubiaceae.

Mature larvae spin a cocoon on the forest floor or among dry leaves. Pupation lasts 2–8 weeks but can extend during diapause. Adults live 5–10 days and reproduce shortly after emergence.

== Ecology and behavior ==
Larvae begin life in groups but become solitary with growth. Their spines, typical of the Hemileucinae, act as a defense mechanism with aposematic coloration. Adults are nocturnal and use cryptic coloration for daytime camouflage.

Reproduction is initiated by pheromones released by females, which attract males. Mating occurs at night. Eggs are laid under leaves to ensure larval food availability.

Unusual resting behaviors, such as slight abdominal curling or head swaying, have been anecdotally observed but require scientific validation.

== Toxicity ==
Caterpillar spines contain proteins and histamines that cause intense pain, swelling, and sometimes allergic reactions in humans. These effects are more common among children and rural workers. Treatment includes cold compresses and antihistamines.

== Host plants ==
Although the full host range is unknown, recorded plants include:

- Myrciaria spp. and Eugenia spp. (Myrtaceae)
- Bauhinia forficata and Erythrina falcata (Fabaceae)
- Alibertia concolor and Alibertia micrantha (Rubiaceae)
- Luehea candida (Malvaceae)
- Hirtella racemosa (Chrysobalanaceae)
- Calycophyllum candidissimum (Rubiaceae)

== Importance ==
Ecological: contributes to vegetation control and serves as prey for predators and parasitoids.

Medical: due to the urticating caterpillars, environmental education is necessary to prevent accidents.
