= Hispaniodirphia =

Scientific classification
- Kingdom: Animalia
- Phylum: Arthropoda
- Clade: Pancrustacea
- Class: Insecta
- Order: Lepidoptera
- Family: Saturniidae
- Subfamily: Hemileucinae
- Genus: Hispaniodirphia; Lemaire, 1999

Genus of moths

Hispaniodirphia is a genus of moths in the family Saturniidae first described by Claude Lemaire in 1999. All species are endemic to Hispaniola, in both Haiti and the Dominican Republic; it is the only saturniid moth genus found in the Greater Antilles.

== Species ==
- Hispaniodirphia lemaireiana Rougerie & Herbin, 2006
- Hispaniodirphia plana (Walker, 1855)
