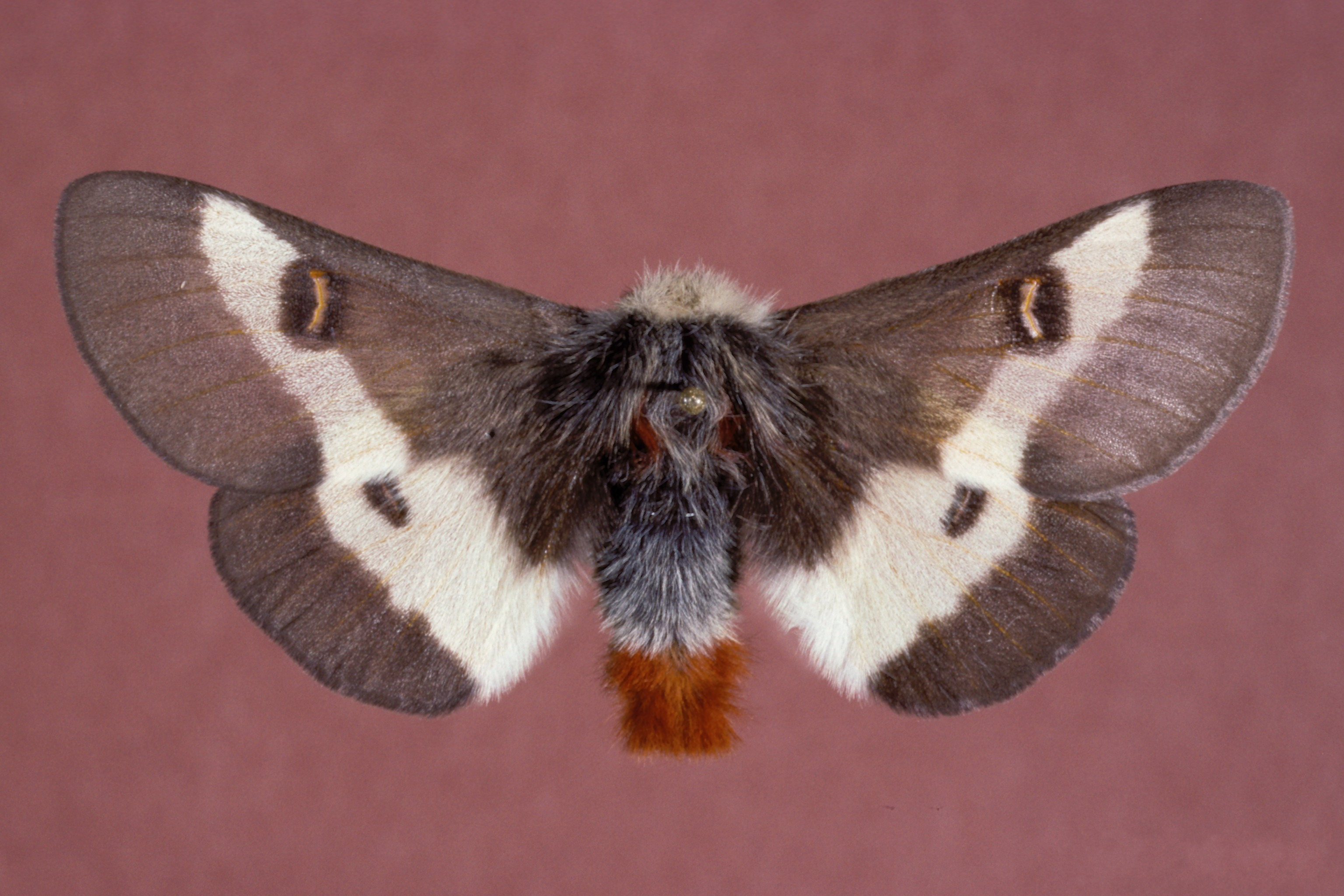
- Hemileuca maia
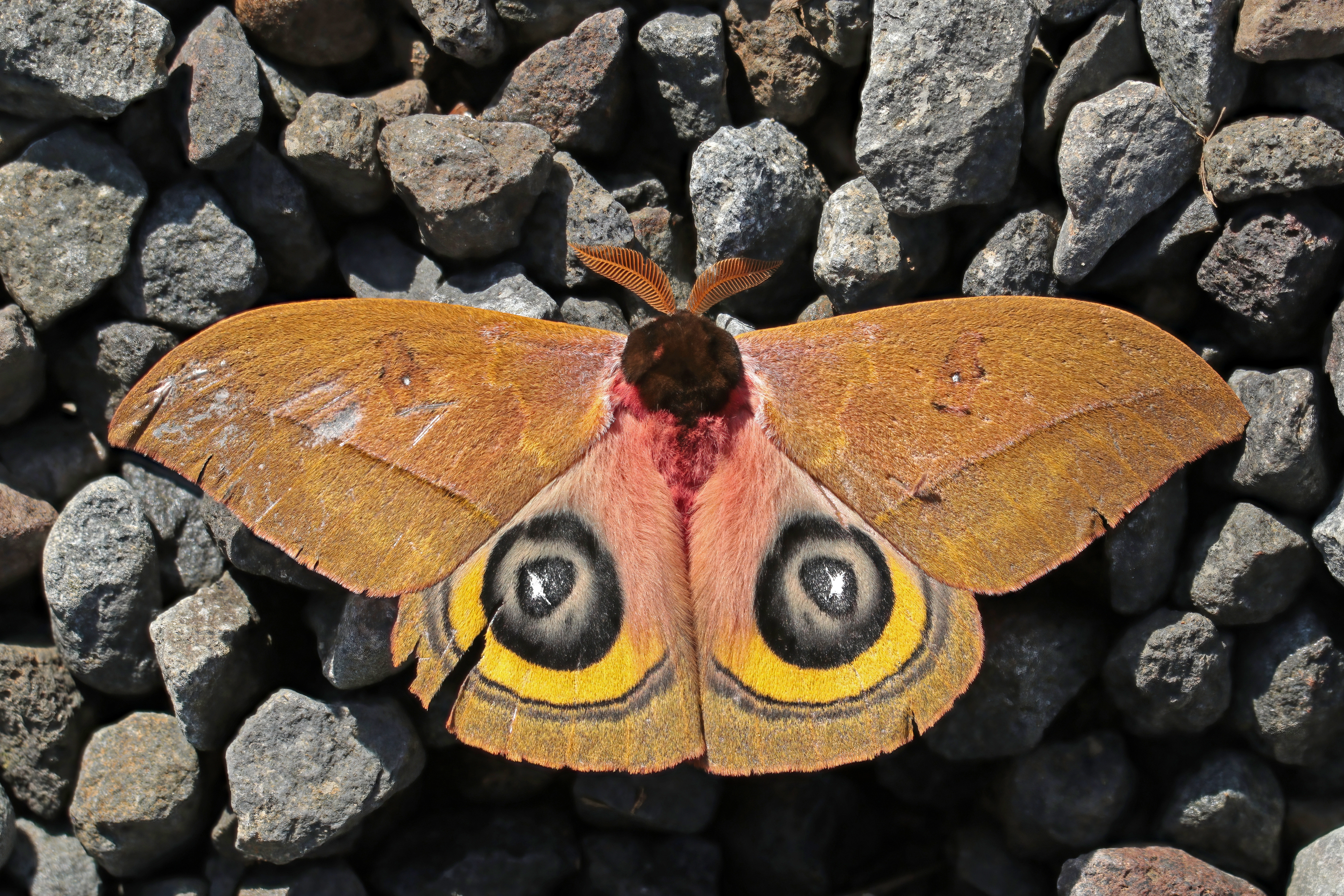
- Automeris belti

Scientific classification
- Domain: Eukaryota
- Kingdom: Animalia
- Phylum: Arthropoda
- Class: Insecta
- Order: Lepidoptera
- Family: Saturniidae
- Subfamily: Hemileucinae

Genera
- See text

= Hemileucinae =

Subfamily of moths

Hemileucinae is a subfamily of the family Saturniidae, including a number of taxa whose caterpillars have venomous urticating hairs.

This subfamily contains the following genera:

- Adetomeris Michener, 1949
- Ancistrota Hübner, 1819
- Arias Lemaire, 1995
- Automerella Michener, 1949
- Automerina Michener, 1949
- Automeris Hübner, 1819
- Automeropsis Lemaire, 1969
- Callodirphia Michener, 1949
- Catacantha Bouvier, 1930
- Catharisa Jordan, 1911
- Cerodirphia Michener, 1949
- Cinommata Butler, 1882
- Coloradia Blake, 1863
- Dihirpa Draudt, 1929
- Dirphia Hübner, 1819
- Dirphiella Michener, 1949
- Dirphiopsis Bouvier, 1928
- Erythromeris Lemaire, 1969
- Eubergia Bouvier, 1929
- Eubergioides Michener, 1949
- Eudyaria Dyar, 1898
- Gamelia Hübner, 1819
- Gamelioides Lemaire, 1988
- Heliconisa Walker, 1855
- Hemileuca Walker, 1855
- Hidripa Draudt, 1929
- Hirpida Draudt, 1929
- Hispaniodirphia Lemaire, 1999
- Hylesia Hübner, 1820
- Hylesiopsis Bouvier, 1929
- Hyperchiria Hübner, 1819
- Hyperchirioides Lemaire, 1981
- Hypermerina Lemaire, 1969
- Ithomisa Oberthür, 1881
- Kentroleuca Draudt, 1930
- Leucanella Lemaire, 1969
- Lonomia Walker, 1855
- Meroleuca Packard, 1904
- Meroleucoides Michener, 1949
- Molippa Walker, 1855
- Ormiscodes Blanchard, 1852
- Paradirphia Michener, 1949
- Periga Walker, 1855
- Periphoba Hübner, [1820]
- Polythysana Walker, 1855
- Prohylesia Draudt, 1929
- Pseudautomeris Lemaire, 1967
- Pseudodirphia Bouvier, 1928
- Rhodirphia Michener, 1949
- Travassosula Michener, 1949
- Xanthodirphia Michener, 1949
