= Xanthodirphia =

Scientific classification
- Kingdom: Animalia
- Phylum: Arthropoda
- Class: Insecta
- Order: Lepidoptera
- Family: Saturniidae
- Subfamily: Hemileucinae
- Genus: Xanthodirphia; Michener, 1949

Genus of moths

Xanthodirphia is a genus of moths in the family Saturniidae first described by Charles Duncan Michener in 1949. It was originally established as a subgenus of the genus Ormiscodes.

== Species ==
- Xanthodirphia abbreviata Becker & Chacon, 2001
- Xanthodirphia amarilla (Schaus, 1908)
