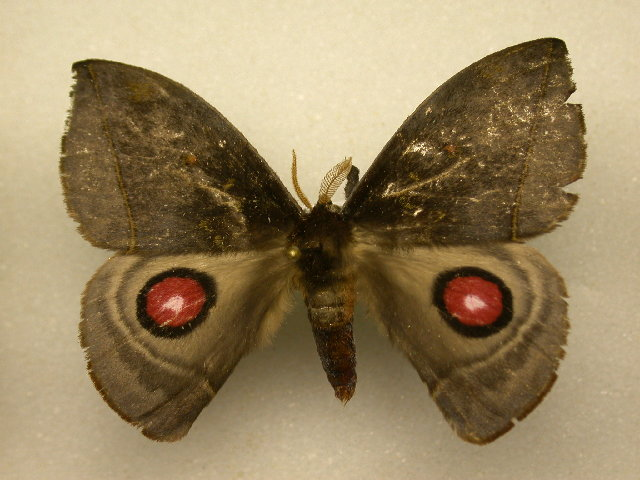
- Gamelia septentrionalis

Scientific classification
- Domain: Eukaryota
- Kingdom: Animalia
- Phylum: Arthropoda
- Class: Insecta
- Order: Lepidoptera
- Family: Saturniidae
- Subfamily: Hemileucinae
- Genus: Gamelia; Hübner, 1819

Species
- See text

= Gamelia (moth) =

Genus of moths

Gamelia is a genus of moths in the family Saturniidae first described by Jacob Hübner in 1819.

== Species ==
The genus includes the following species:

- Gamelia abas (Cramer, 1775)
- Gamelia abasia (Stoll, 1781)
- Gamelia abasiella Lemaire, 1973
- Gamelia anableps (R. Felder & Rogenhofer, 1874)
- Gamelia berliozi Lemaire, 1967
- Gamelia catharina (Draudt, 1929)
- Gamelia cimarrones Decaens, Bonilla & Ramirez, 2005
- Gamelia dargei Naumann, Brosch & Wenczel, 2005
- Gamelia denhezi Lemaire, 1967
- Gamelia kiefferi Lemaire, 1967
- Gamelia lichyi Lemaire, 1973
- Gamelia longispina Naumann, Brosch & Wenczel, 2005
- Gamelia musta Schaus, 1912
- Gamelia neidhoeferi Lemaire, 1967
- Gamelia paraensis Lemaire, 1973
- Gamelia pygmaea (Schaus, 1904)
- Gamelia pyrrhomelas (Walker, 1855)
- Gamelia remissa (Weymer, 1907)
- Gamelia remissoides Lemaire, 1967
- Gamelia rindgei Lemaire, 1967
- Gamelia rubriluna (Walker, 1862)
- Gamelia septentrionalis Bouvier, 1936
- Gamelia vanschaycki Naumann, Brosch & Wenczel, 2005
- Gamelia viettei Lemaire, 1967
