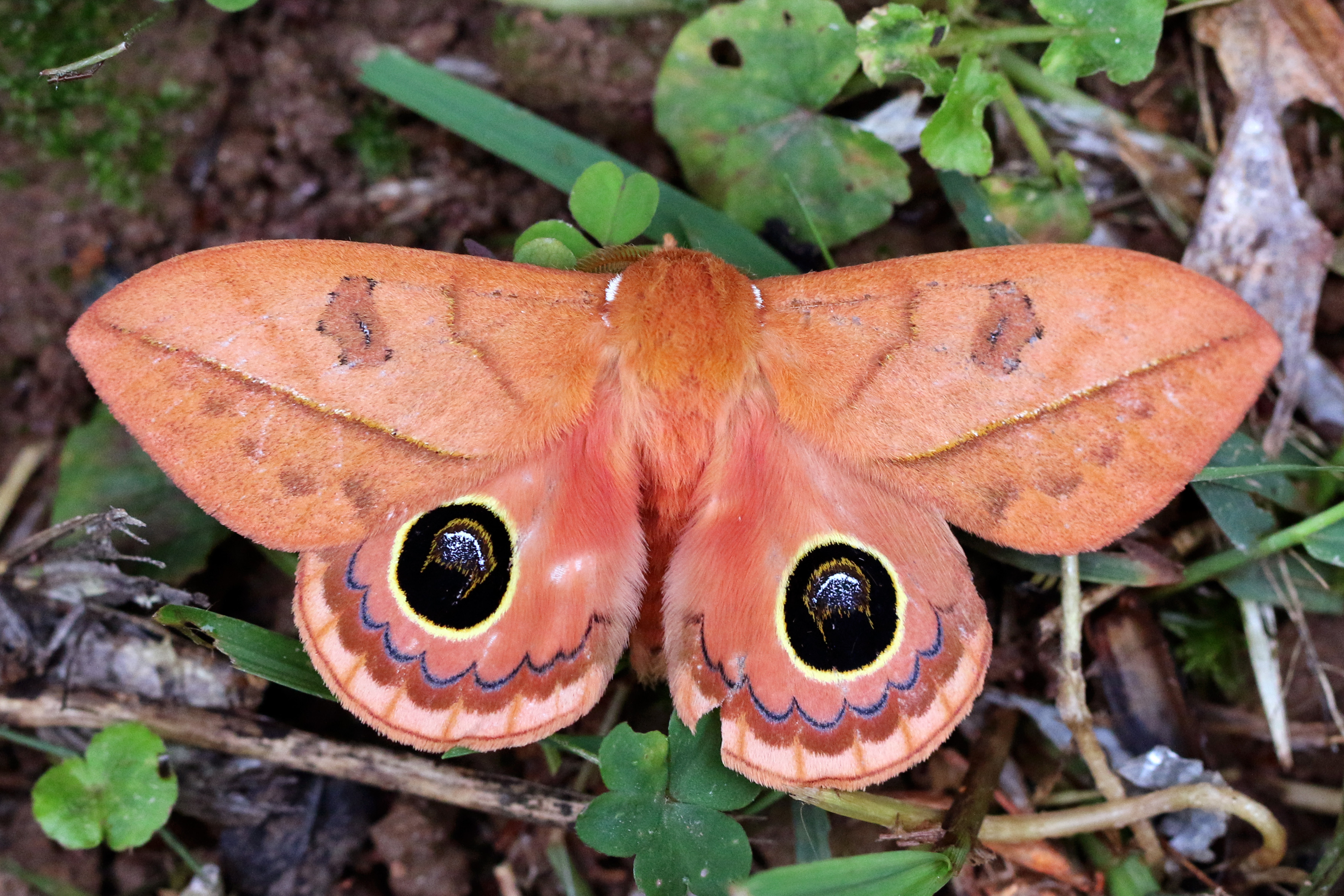
- Pseudautomeris luteata, Brazil

Scientific classification
- Domain: Eukaryota
- Kingdom: Animalia
- Phylum: Arthropoda
- Class: Insecta
- Order: Lepidoptera
- Family: Saturniidae
- Subfamily: Hemileucinae
- Genus: Pseudautomeris; Lemaire, 1967

= Pseudautomeris =

Genus of moths

Pseudautomeris is a genus of moths in the family Saturniidae first described by Claude Lemaire in 1967.

== Species ==
The genus includes the following species:

- Pseudautomeris antioquia (Schaus, 1921)
- Pseudautomeris arminicuscoensis Brechlin & Meister, 2010
- Pseudautomeris arminiyungasensis Brechlin & Meister, 2010
- Pseudautomeris boettgeri Naumann, Brosch & Wenczel, 2005
- Pseudautomeris brasiliensis (Walker, 1855)
- Pseudautomeris chinchipensis Racheli & Racheli, 2006
- Pseudautomeris chrisbrechlinae Brechlin & Meister, 2010
- Pseudautomeris coronis (Schaus, 1913)
- Pseudautomeris erubescens (Boisduval, 1875)
- Pseudautomeris fimbridentata (Dognin, 1916)
- Pseudautomeris grammivora (E. D. Jones, 1908)
- Pseudautomeris hubneri (Boisduval, 1875)
- Pseudautomeris irene (Cramer, 1779)
- Pseudautomeris lata (Conte, 1906)
- Pseudautomeris luteata (Walker, 1865)
- Pseudautomeris ophthalmica (Moore, 1883)
- Pseudautomeris pohli Lemaire, 1967
- Pseudautomeris porifera (Strand, 1920)
- Pseudautomeris rudloffi Brechlin & Meister, 2010
- Pseudautomeris salmonea (Cramer, 1777)
- Pseudautomeris stawiarskii (Gagarin, 1936)
- Pseudautomeris subcoronis Lemaire, 1967
- Pseudautomeris toulgoeti Lemaire, 2002
- Pseudautomeris yourii Lemaire, 1985
