= Rhodirphia =

Scientific classification
- Kingdom: Animalia
- Phylum: Arthropoda
- Class: Insecta
- Order: Lepidoptera
- Family: Saturniidae
- Subfamily: Hemileucinae
- Genus: Rhodirphia; Michener, 1949

Genus of moths

Rhodirphia is a genus of moths in the family Saturniidae first described by Charles Duncan Michener in 1949.

== Species ==
- Rhodirphia carminata (Schaus, 1902)
