= Ronald W. Hodges =

American entomologist (1934–2017)

- Born: August 7, 1934; Lansing
- Died: December 10, 2017 (aged 83); Eugene
- Alma mater: Michigan State University; Cornell University
- Occupation: Entomologist, lepidopterist, scientific collector

Ronald William Hodges (August 7, 1934 – December 10, 2017), known as Ron, was an American entomologist and lepidopterist.

Hodges was born on August 7, 1934, and was raised in Michigan. He was educated at Michigan State University, obtaining first a BSc then an MSc. He obtained a PhD from Cornell University in 1961.

Interested in moths from a young age, he obtained a National Science Foundation postdoctoral fellowship and began researching the Gelechiidae. He broke off from that work to take up a post at the Systematic Entomology Laboratory of the United States Department of Agriculture's Agricultural Research Service, in the National Museum of Natural History. He eventually left that role to return to work on gelechioid moths.

He was the author of three volumes of The Moths of America North of Mexico, on the Oecophoridae, Cosmopterigidae, and Gelechiidae. He served as managing director of the series' publisher, the Wedge Entomological Research Foundation and as its editor-in-chief.

He introduced the MONA numbering scheme for North American moths in 1983 in the publication Check List of the Lepidoptera of America North of Mexico, which he edited. A MONA number is also referred to as a "Hodges number".

He was elected to the Washington Biologists' Field Club in 1963 and served as its president from 1976 to 1979. He was also president of the Lepidopterists' Society from 1975 to 1976; of the Maryland Entomological Society from 1973 to 1974; and of the American Association for Zoological Nomenclature from 1993 to 1995.

Upon retirement in January 1997 he and his wife Elaine moved to Eugene, Oregon.

He died at home in Eugene, on December 10, 2017.

== Recognition ==
Hodges was granted the Thomas Say Award by the Entomological Society of America for his work on Moths of North America in 1990, and the Lepidopterists' Society's Karl Jordan Medal for his gelechioid research in 1997. He was elected an honorary member of the Entomological Society of Washington in 1999.

Chionodes hodgesorum was named in honor of Hodges and his wife, to coincide with his 80th birthday.

Hodges' papers from the period 1960 to 1997 are in the collection of the Smithsonian Institution.
