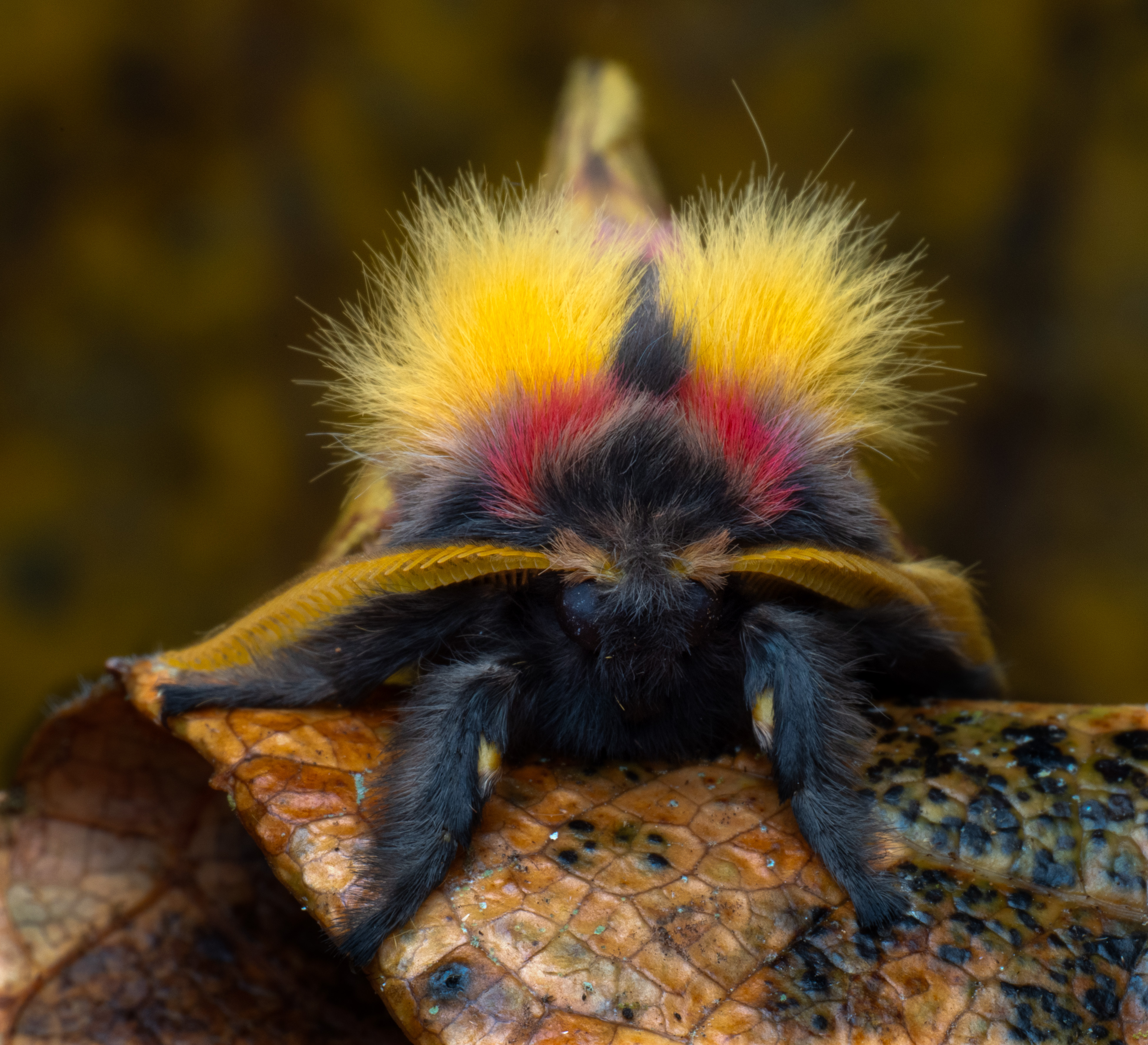

Scientific classification
- Kingdom: Animalia
- Phylum: Arthropoda
- Clade: Pancrustacea
- Class: Insecta
- Order: Lepidoptera
- Family: Saturniidae
- Genus: Xanthodirphia
- Species: X. amarilla

Binomial name
- Xanthodirphia amarilla (Schaus, 1908)

= Xanthodirphia amarilla =

Species of moth

Xanthodirphia amarilla is a species of moth in the family Saturniidae. It is found only in the high elevation mountains of Costa Rica.

== Gallery ==
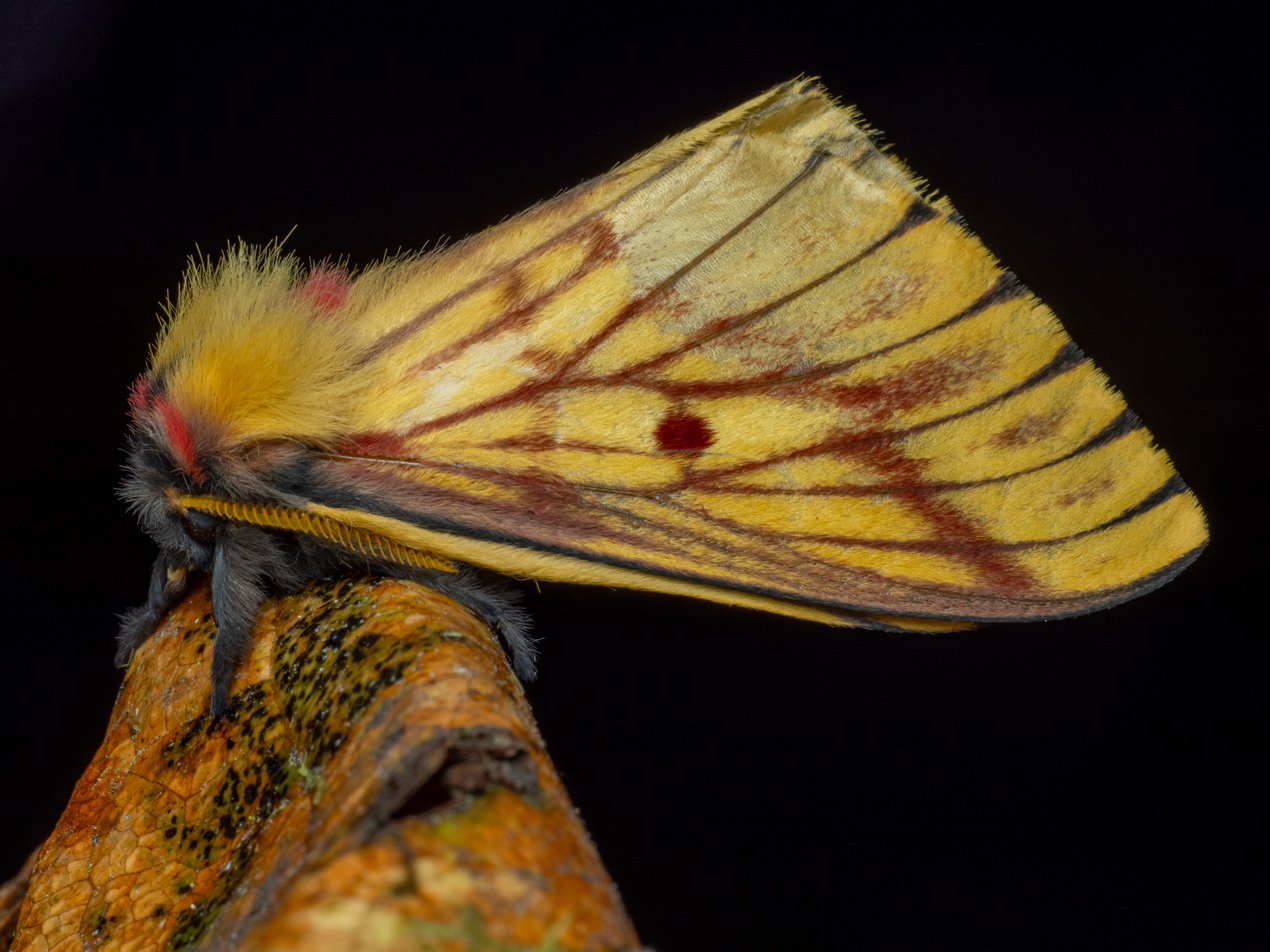
Side view
