= Prohylesia =

Scientific classification
- Domain: Eukaryota
- Kingdom: Animalia
- Phylum: Arthropoda
- Class: Insecta
- Order: Lepidoptera
- Family: Saturniidae
- Subfamily: Hemileucinae
- Genus: Prohylesia; Draudt, 1929

Genus of moths

Prohylesia is a genus of moths in the family Saturniidae first described by Max Wilhelm Karl Draudt in 1929.

== Species ==
- Prohylesia friburgensis (Schaus, 1915)
- Prohylesia peruviana Lemaire, 1982
- Prohylesia rosalinda Draudt, 1929
- Prohylesia zikani Draudt, 1929
