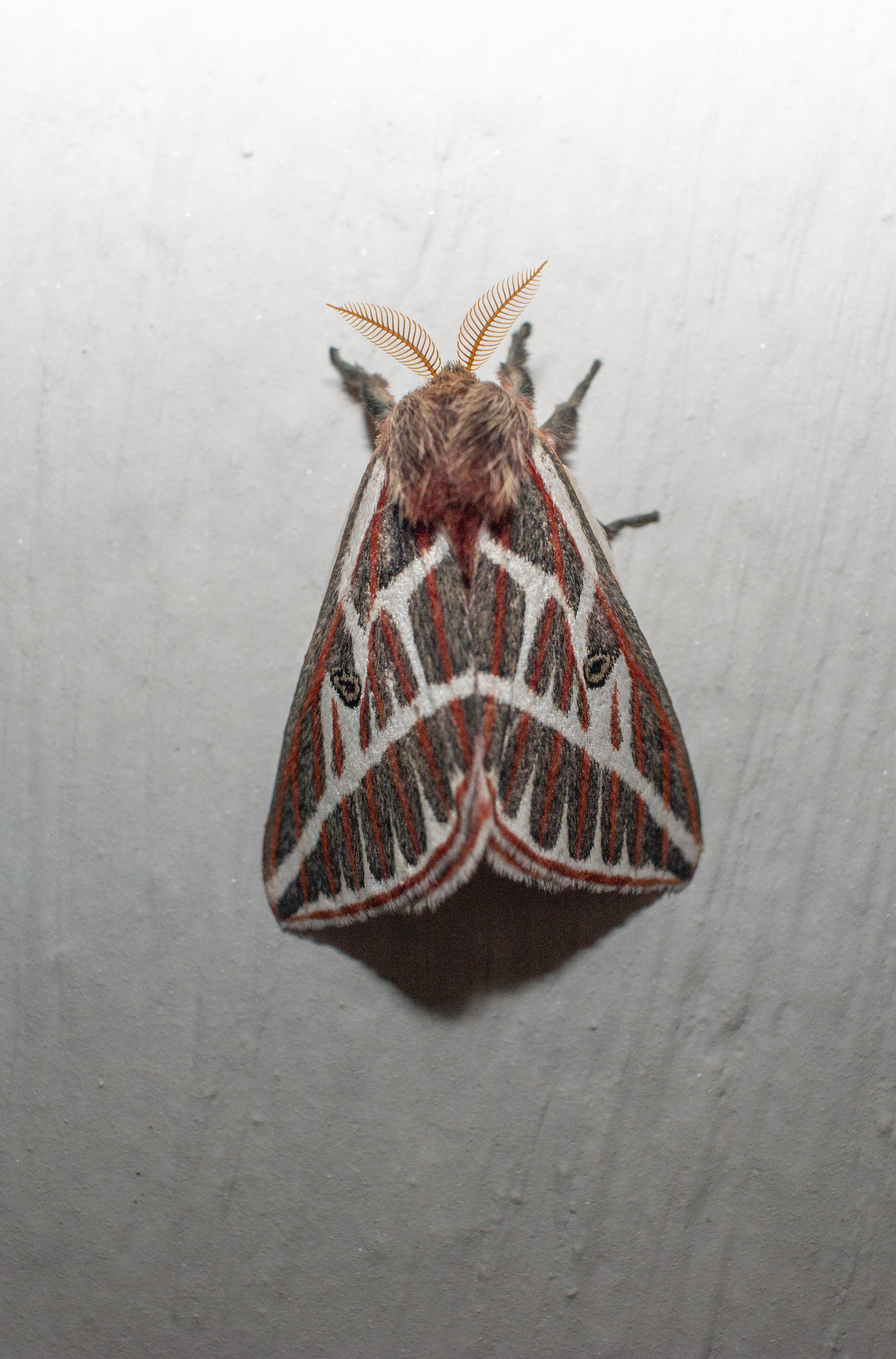
- Eubergia argyrea

Scientific classification
- Kingdom: Animalia
- Phylum: Arthropoda
- Clade: Pancrustacea
- Class: Insecta
- Order: Lepidoptera
- Family: Saturniidae
- Subfamily: Hemileucinae
- Genus: Eubergia; Bouvier, 1929

= Eubergia =

Genus of moths

Eubergia is a genus of moths in the family Saturniidae first described by Eugène Louis Bouvier in 1929.

== Species ==
- Eubergia argyrea (Weymer, 1908)
- Eubergia caisa (Berg, 1883)
- Eubergia radians (Dognin, 1911)
