= Kentroleuca =

Scientific classification
- Domain: Eukaryota
- Kingdom: Animalia
- Phylum: Arthropoda
- Class: Insecta
- Order: Lepidoptera
- Family: Saturniidae
- Subfamily: Hemileucinae
- Genus: Kentroleuca; Draudt, 1930

Species
- See text

Genus of moths

Kentroleuca is a genus of moths in the family Saturniidae first described by Max Wilhelm Karl Draudt in 1930.

== Species ==
The genus includes the following species:

- Kentroleuca albilinea (Schaus, 1908)
- Kentroleuca boliviensis Brechlin & Meister, 2002
- Kentroleuca brunneategulata Mielke & Furtado, 2006
- Kentroleuca dukinfieldi (Schaus, 1894)
- Kentroleuca griseoalbata Mielke & Furtado, 2006
- Kentroleuca lineosa (Walker, 1855)
- Kentroleuca novaholandensis Lemaire & C. Mielke, 2001
- Kentroleuca spitzi Lemaire, 1971
