= Hidripa =

Scientific classification
- Domain: Eukaryota
- Kingdom: Animalia
- Phylum: Arthropoda
- Class: Insecta
- Order: Lepidoptera
- Family: Saturniidae
- Subfamily: Hemileucinae
- Genus: Hidripa; Draudt, 1929

Genus of moths

Hidripa is a genus of moths in the family Saturniidae first described by Max Wilhelm Karl Draudt in 1929.

== Species ==
- Hidripa albipellis Draudt, 1930
- Hidripa gschwandneri Draudt, 1930
- Hidripa paranensis (Bouvier, 1929)
- Hidripa perdix (Maassen & Weyding, 1885)
- Hidripa ruscheweyhi (Berg, 1885)
- Hidripa taglia (Schaus, 1896)
