= Dihirpa =

Scientific classification
- Domain: Eukaryota
- Kingdom: Animalia
- Phylum: Arthropoda
- Class: Insecta
- Order: Lepidoptera
- Family: Saturniidae
- Subfamily: Hemileucinae
- Genus: Dihirpa; Draudt, 1929

Genus of moths

Dihirpa is a genus of moths in the family Saturniidae first described by Max Wilhelm Karl Draudt in 1929.

== Species ==
- Dihirpa lamasi Lemaire, 1982
- Dihirpa litura (Walker, 1855)
