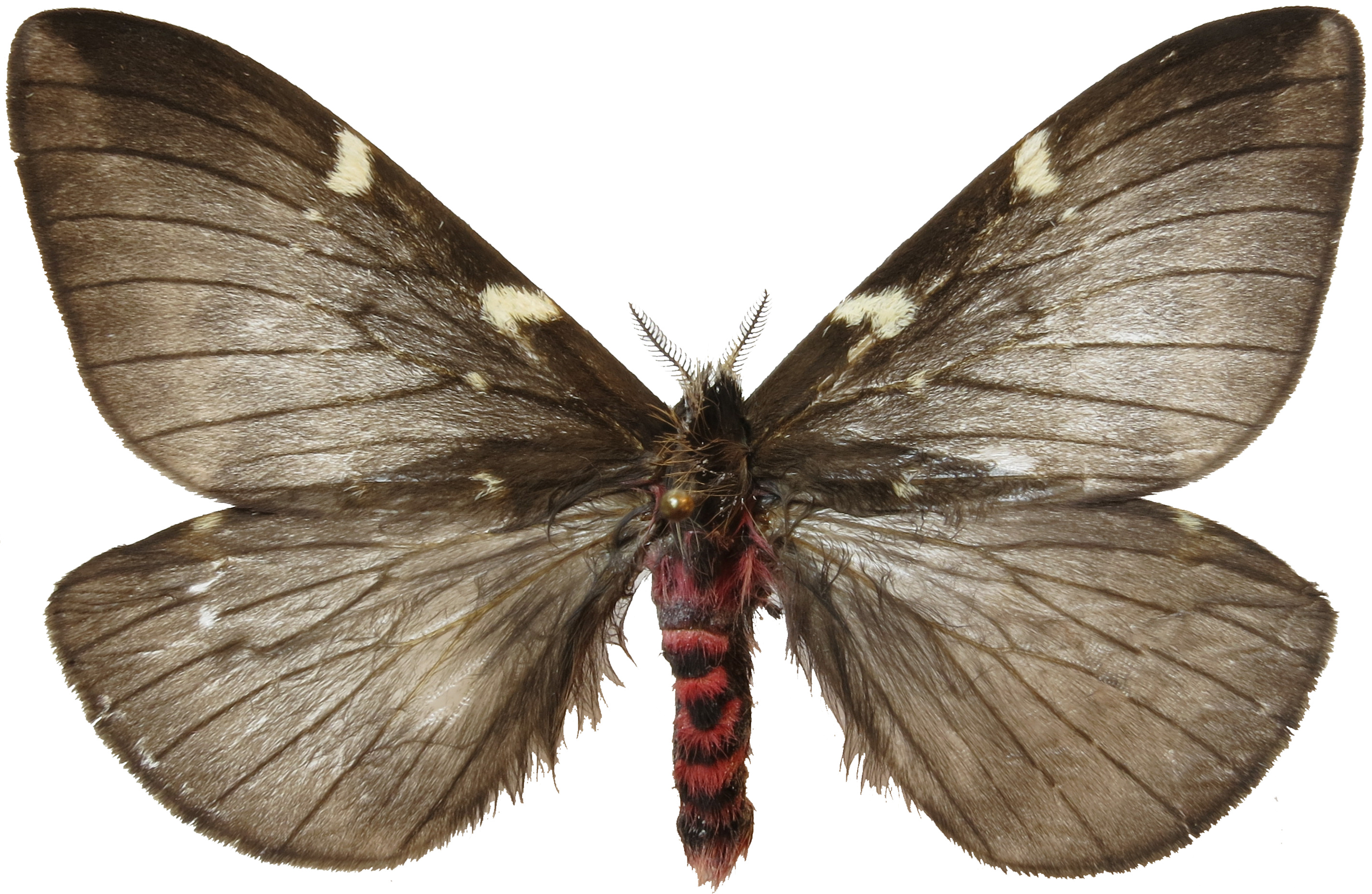
- Paradirphia oblita

Scientific classification
- Domain: Eukaryota
- Kingdom: Animalia
- Phylum: Arthropoda
- Class: Insecta
- Order: Lepidoptera
- Family: Saturniidae
- Subfamily: Hemileucinae
- Genus: Paradirphia; Michener, 1949

Species
- See text

= Paradirphia =

Genus of moths

Paradirphia is a genus of moths in the family Saturniidae first described by Charles Duncan Michener in 1949.

== Species ==
The genus includes the following species:

- Paradirphia andicola Lemaire, 2002
- Paradirphia andrei Brechlin & Meister, 2010
- Paradirphia anikae Brechlin & Meister, 2010
- Paradirphia antonia (Dognin, 1911)
- Paradirphia boudinoti Lemaire & Wolfe, 1990
- Paradirphia citrina (Druce, 1886)
- Paradirphia coprea (Draudt, 1930)
- Paradirphia estivalisae Guerrero & Passola, 2003
- Paradirphia frankae Brechlin & Meister, 2010
- Paradirphia fumosa (R. Felder & Rogenhofer, 1874)
- Paradirphia gabrielae Brechlin & Meister, 2010
- Paradirphia geneforti (Bouvier, 1923)
- Paradirphia hectori Brechlin & Meister, 2010
- Paradirphia herediana Brechlin & Meister, 2010
- Paradirphia hoegei (Druce, 1886)
- Paradirphia ibarai Balcazar, 1999
- Paradirphia lasiocampina (R. Felder & Rogenhofer, 1874)
- Paradirphia leoni Brechlin & Meister, 2010
- Paradirphia lieseorum Brechlin & Meister, 2010
- Paradirphia manes (Druce, 1897)
- Paradirphia oblita (Lemaire, 1976)
- Paradirphia pararudloffi Brechlin & Meister, 2010
- Paradirphia peggyae Brechlin & Meister, 2010
- Paradirphia rectilineata Wolfe, 1994
- Paradirphia rudloffi Brechlin & Meister, 2008
- Paradirphia semirosea (Walker, 1855)
- Paradirphia talamancaia Brechlin & Meister, 2010
- Paradirphia torva (Weymer, 1907)
- Paradirphia valverdei Lemaire & Wolfe, 1990
- Paradirphia winifredae Lemaire & Wolfe, 1990
