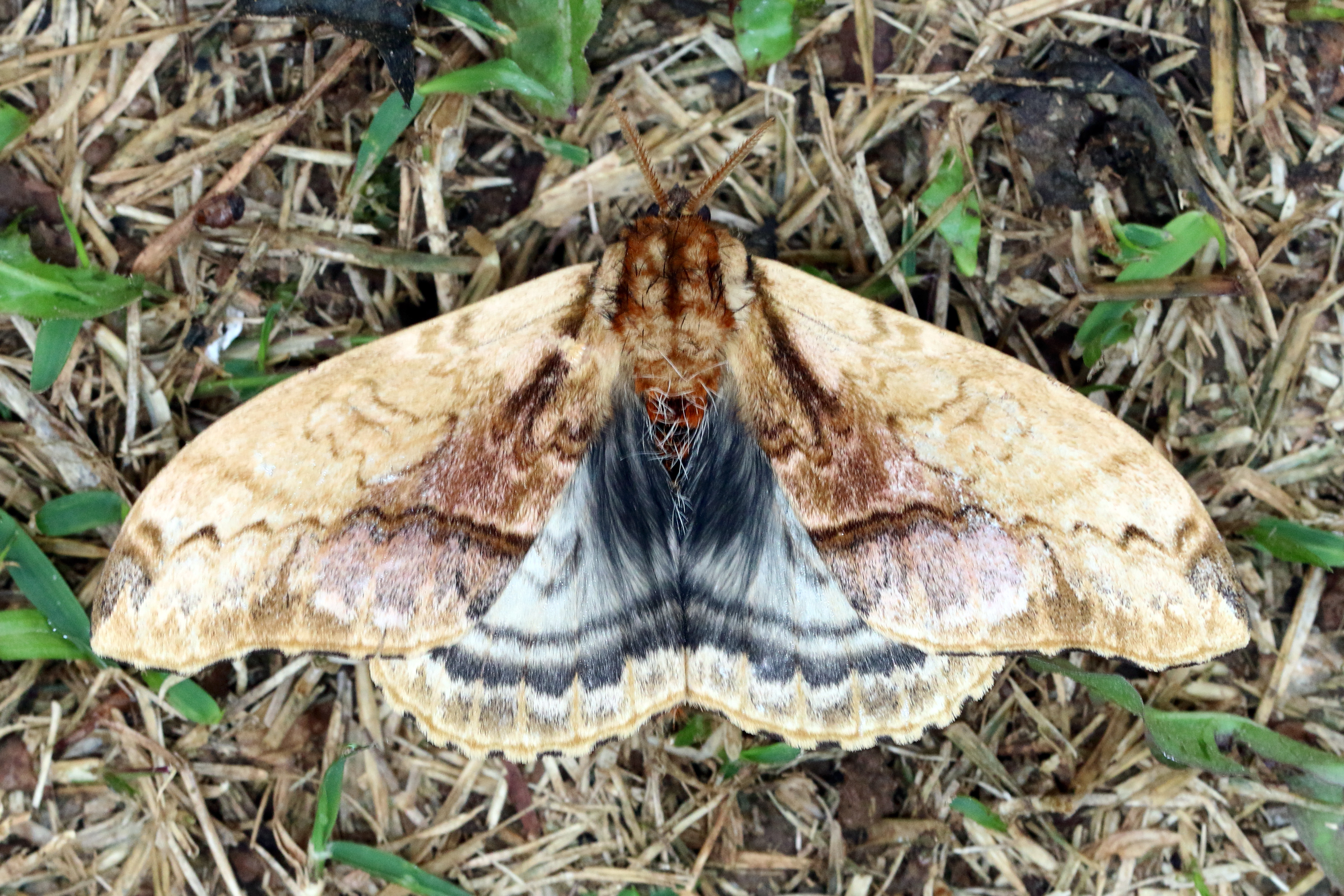
- Molippa sabina, Brazil

Scientific classification
- Domain: Eukaryota
- Kingdom: Animalia
- Phylum: Arthropoda
- Class: Insecta
- Order: Lepidoptera
- Family: Saturniidae
- Subfamily: Hemileucinae
- Genus: Molippa; Walker, 1855

Species
- See text

Synonyms
- Rhodormiscodes Packard, 1852; Prodirphia Bouvier, 1928

= Molippa =

Genus of moths

Molippa is a genus of moths in the family Saturniidae first described by Francis Walker in 1855.

== Species ==
The genus includes the following species:

- Molippa azuelensis Lemaire, 1976
- Molippa basina Maassen & Weyding, 1885
- Molippa basinoides Bouvier, 1926
- Molippa bertrandi Lemaire, 1982
- Molippa bertrandoides Brechlin & Meister, 2008
- Molippa binasa (Schaus, 1924)
- Molippa convergens (Walker, 1855)
- Molippa coracoralinae Lemaire & Tangerini, 2002
- Molippa cruenta (Walker, 1855)
- Molippa eophila (Dognin, 1908)
- Molippa flavocrinata Mabille, 1896
- Molippa larensis Lemaire, 1972
- Molippa latemedia (Druce, 1890)
- Molippa luzalessarum Naumann, Brosch & Wenczel, 2005
- Molippa nibasa Maassen & Weyding, 1885
- Molippa ninfa (Schaus, 1921)
- Molippa pearsoni Lemaire, 1982
- Molippa pilarae Naumann, Brosch, Wenczel & Bottger, 2005
- Molippa placida (Schaus, 1921)
- Molippa rosea (Druce, 1886)
- Molippa sabina Walker, 1855
- Molippa simillima E. D. Jones, 1907
- Molippa strigosa (Maassen & Weyding, 1885)
- Molippa superba (Burmeister, 1878)
- Molippa tusina (Schaus, 1921)
- Molippa wenczeli Meister & Brechlin, 2008
- Molippa wittmeri Lemaire, 1976
