= Citheronioides =

Scientific classification
- Domain: Eukaryota
- Kingdom: Animalia
- Phylum: Arthropoda
- Class: Insecta
- Order: Lepidoptera
- Family: Saturniidae
- Subfamily: Ceratocampinae
- Genus: Citheronioides; Lemaire, 1988

Genus of moths

Citheronioides is a genus of moths in the family Saturniidae first described by Claude Lemaire in 1988.

== Species ==
- Citheronioides collaris (W. Rothschild, 1907)
