= Meroleucoides =

Scientific classification
- Domain: Eukaryota
- Kingdom: Animalia
- Phylum: Arthropoda
- Class: Insecta
- Order: Lepidoptera
- Family: Saturniidae
- Subfamily: Hemileucinae
- Genus: Meroleucoides; Michener, 1949

Genus of moths

Meroleucoides is a genus of moths in the family Saturniidae first described by Charles Duncan Michener in 1949.

== Species ==
- Meroleucoides albomaculata (Dognin, 1916)
- Meroleucoides amarillae Lemaire & Wolfe, 1995
- Meroleucoides bipectinata Lemaire, 2002
- Meroleucoides bipunctata Lemaire, 1982
- Meroleucoides bravera Lemaire, 2002
- Meroleucoides dargei Lemaire, 1982
- Meroleucoides diazmaurini Decaens, Bonilla & Ramirez, 2005
- Meroleucoides erythropus (Maassen, 1890)
- Meroleucoides famula (Maassen, 1890)
- Meroleucoides fassli Lemaire, 1995
- Meroleucoides flavodiscata (Dognin, 1916)
- Meroleucoides laverna (Druce, 1890)
- Meroleucoides microstyx Lemaire, 2002
- Meroleucoides modesta Lemaire, 2002
- Meroleucoides nadiana Lemaire, 2002
- Meroleucoides naias (Bouvier, 1929)
- Meroleucoides nata (Maassen, 1890)
- Meroleucoides penai Lemaire, 1982
- Meroleucoides ramicosa (Lemaire, 1975)
- Meroleucoides rectilineata Lemaire & Venedictoff, 1989
- Meroleucoides riveti Lemaire, 2002
- Meroleucoides verae van Schayck, 2000
