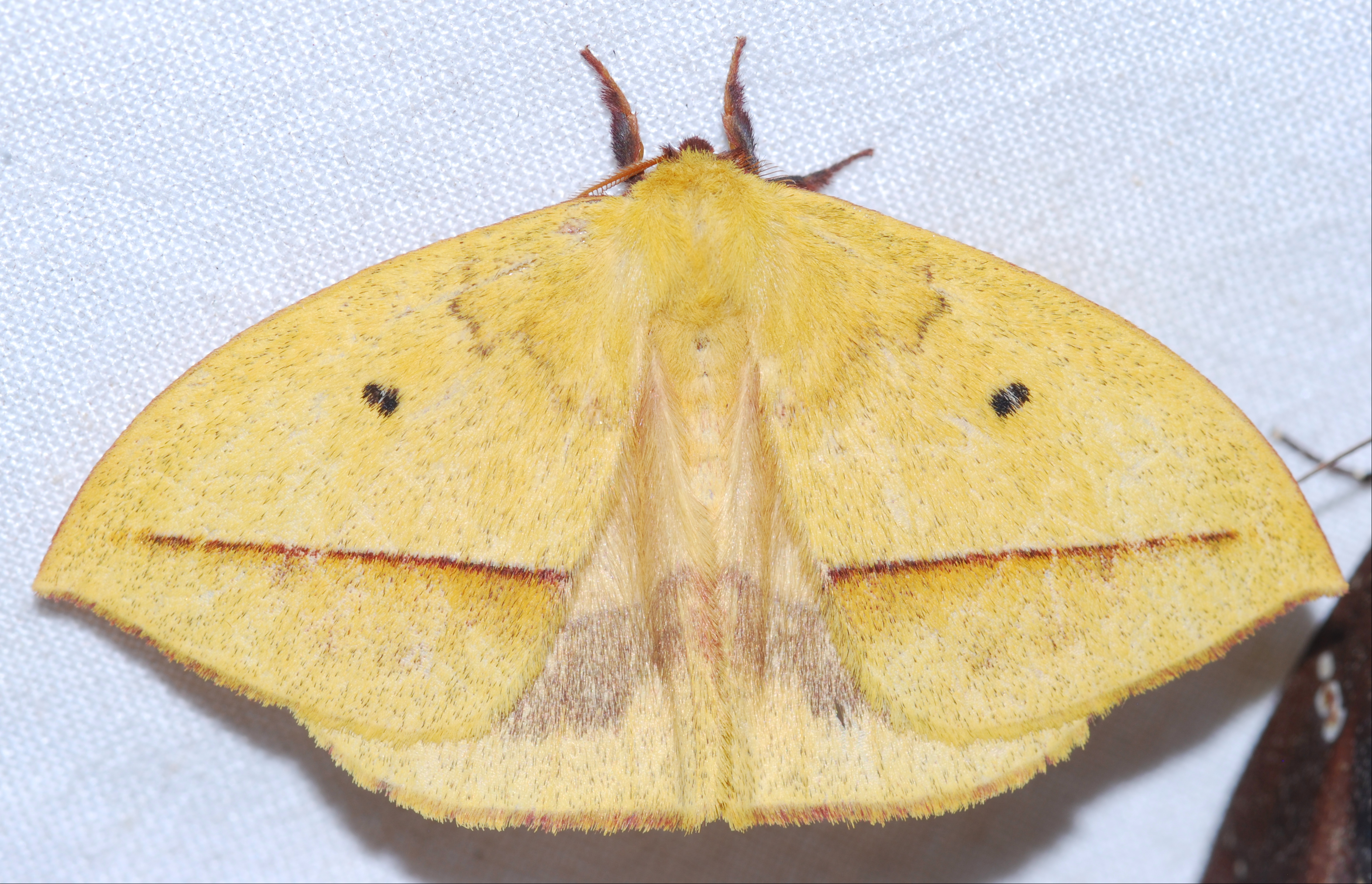
- Ancistrota plagia

Scientific classification
- Domain: Eukaryota
- Kingdom: Animalia
- Phylum: Arthropoda
- Class: Insecta
- Order: Lepidoptera
- Family: Saturniidae
- Subfamily: Hemileucinae
- Genus: Ancistrota; Hübner, 1819

= Ancistrota =

Genus of moths

Ancistrota is a genus of moths in the family Saturniidae first described by Jacob Hübner in 1819.

== Species ==
- Ancistrota plagia Hübner, 1819
