= Meroleuca =

Scientific classification
- Kingdom: Animalia
- Phylum: Arthropoda
- Clade: Pancrustacea
- Class: Insecta
- Order: Lepidoptera
- Family: Saturniidae
- Subfamily: Hemileucinae
- Genus: Meroleuca; Packard, 1904

Genus of moths

Meroleuca is a genus of moths in the family Saturniidae first described by Packard in 1904.

== Species ==
- Meroleuca catamarcensis Meister & Brechlin, 2008
- Meroleuca decaensi Lemaire, 1995
- Meroleuca lituroides (Bouvier, 1929)
- Meroleuca mossi Lemaire, 1995
- Meroleuca nigra (Dognin, 1913)
- Meroleuca raineri Brechlin & Meister, 2008
- Meroleuca venosa (Walker, 1855)
