= Pseudodirphia varioides =

Scientific classification
- Kingdom: Animalia
- Phylum: Arthropoda
- Class: Insecta
- Order: Lepidoptera
- Family: Saturniidae
- Genus: Pseudodirphia
- Species: P. varioides

Binomial name
- Pseudodirphia varioides Brechlin, 2018

Species of moth

Pseudodirphia varioides is a species of moth in the family Saturniidae first described by Ronald Brechlin in 2018. It is native to Bolivia.
