= Arias (moth) =

Scientific classification
- Domain: Eukaryota
- Kingdom: Animalia
- Phylum: Arthropoda
- Class: Insecta
- Order: Lepidoptera
- Family: Saturniidae
- Subfamily: Hemileucinae
- Genus: Arias; Lemaire, 1995

Genus of moths

Arias is a genus of moths in the family Saturniidae first described by Claude Lemaire in 1995.

== Species ==
- Arias inbio Lemaire, 1995
