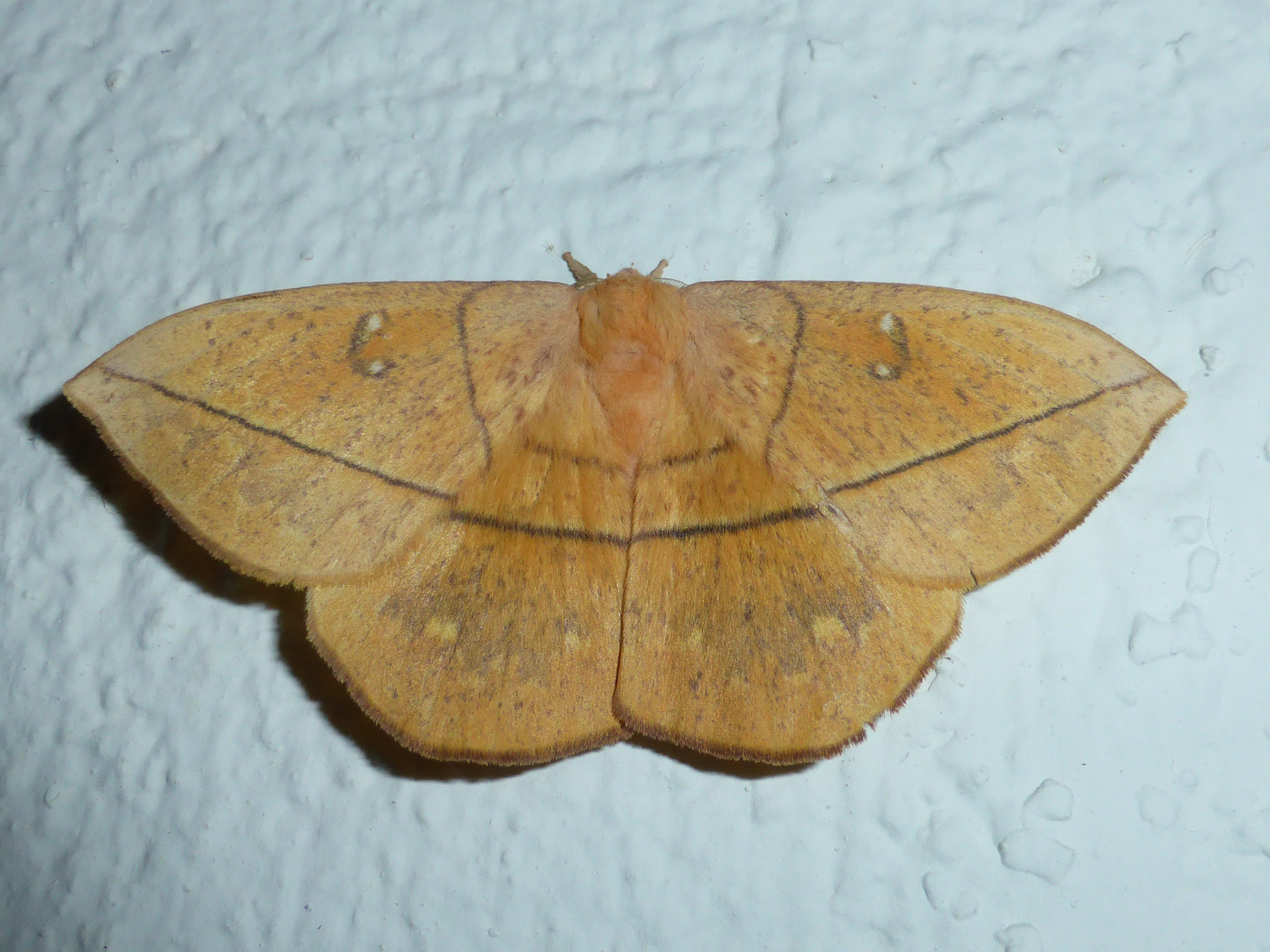
- Periga aurantiaca

Scientific classification
- Kingdom: Animalia
- Phylum: Arthropoda
- Clade: Pancrustacea
- Class: Insecta
- Order: Lepidoptera
- Family: Saturniidae
- Subfamily: Hemileucinae
- Genus: Periga; Walker, 1855

Species
- See text

= Periga =

Genus of moths

Periga is a genus of moths in the family Saturniidae first described by Francis Walker in 1855.

== Species ==
The genus includes the following species:

- Periga angulosa (Lemaire, 1972)
- Periga anitae Naumann, Brosch & Wenczel, 2005
- Periga armata (Lemaire, 1973)
- Periga aurantiaca (Lemaire, 1972)
- Periga bispinosa (Lemaire, 1972)
- Periga boettgerorum Naumann, Brosch & Wenczel, 2005
- Periga brechlini Naumann, Brosch & Wenczel, 2005
- Periga circumstans Walker, 1855
- Periga cluacina (Druce, 1886)
- Periga cynira (Cramer, 1777)
- Periga elsa (Lemaire, 1973)
- Periga extensiva Lemaire, 2002
- Periga falcata Walker, 1855
- Periga galbimaculata (Lemaire, 1972)
- Periga gueneei (Lemaire, 1973)
- Periga herbini Lemaire, 2002
- Periga inexpectata (Lemaire, 1972)
- Periga insidiosa (Lemaire, 1972)
- Periga intensiva (Lemaire, 1973)
- Periga kindli Lemaire, 1993
- Periga kishidai Naumann, Brosch & Wenczel, 2005
- Periga lichyi (Lemaire, 1972)
- Periga lobulata Lemaire, 2002
- Periga occidentalis (Lemaire, 1972)
- Periga parvibulbacea (Lemaire, 1972)
- Periga prattorum (Lemaire, 1972)
- Periga rasplusi (Lemaire, 1985)
- Periga sanguinea Lemaire, 2002
- Periga spatulata (Lemaire, 1973)
- Periga squamosa (Lemaire, 1972)
