= Claude Lemaire =

French entomologist (1921–2004)

Claude Lemaire (21 February 1921 – 5 February 2004) was a French entomologist. He specialised in Lepidoptera Saturniidae.

== Studies ==
- Graduate Diploma of Civil Law, Faculty of Law of Paris
- Graduate Diploma of Political Economy, Faculty of Law of Paris
- Doctorate in Law
- Doctorate of the University of Paris (Sciences)

== Professional activities ==
- 1949–1956: Bank. Chief of contentious department
- 1957–1959: Auctioneer at Drouot (Paris)

== Entomological activities ==
=== Publications ===
Lemaire published about 100 entomological works.

=== Awards ===
He was elected president of the Société entomologique de France in 1972, president of the Association for Tropical Lepidoptera in 1992, and twice as vice-president of the Lepidopterists' Society.

He received the prizes Constant (1971) and Réaumur (2003) of the Société entomologique de France. In 1999, he received the Karl Jordan Medal of the Lepidopterists' Society.

== Genus and species described ==
In their necrology, Naumann, Brosch and Nässig, gave 319 taxa described by Lemaire directly or in collaboration with other authors.

=== Genera ===
Ten genera are attributed to Lemaire:

- Arias Lemaire, 1995
- Automeropsis Lemaire, 1969
- Citheronioides Lemaire, 1988
- Erythromeris Lemaire, 1969
- Gamelioides Lemaire, 1988
- Hyperchirioides Lemaire, 1981
- Hypermerina Lemaire, 1969
- Leucanella Lemaire, 1969
- Mielkesia Lemaire, 1988
- Pseudautomeris Lemaire, 1967
