= Hyperchirioides =

Scientific classification
- Kingdom: Animalia
- Phylum: Arthropoda
- Class: Insecta
- Order: Lepidoptera
- Family: Saturniidae
- Subfamily: Hemileucinae
- Genus: Hyperchirioides; Lemaire, 1981

Genus of moths

Hyperchirioides is a genus of moths in the family Saturniidae. The genus was erected by Claude Lemaire in 1981.

== Species ==
- Hyperchirioides bulaea (Maassen & Weyding, 1885)
