= Pseudautomeris toulgoeti =

Scientific classification
- Kingdom: Animalia
- Phylum: Arthropoda
- Class: Insecta
- Order: Lepidoptera
- Family: Saturniidae
- Genus: Pseudautomeris
- Species: P. toulgoeti

Binomial name
- Pseudautomeris toulgoeti Lemaire, 2002

Species of butterfly

Pseudautomeris toulgoeti is a species of butterfly which belongs to the family of saturniids (Saturniidae).

== Appearance ==
Medium-sized (wingspan 60–80 mm) brown saturniids with large eye markings on their hind wings. The forewings are slightly tapered, but not sickle-shaped, most often featuring a long stripe. The base color of the hind wing is often reddish, with the eye spot having a bluish core.

== Life cycle ==
The larvae tend to live socially, at least as young, on different shrubs and trees. Like other saturniidae, the adults have reduced mouths, and they do not feed. The species fly at night, during the day they rest between withered leaves where they are well camouflaged. Should an animal still detect the butterfly, it opens the distortions so that the "staring" eye spots appear - this is often enough to scare away a small predator.

== Urticating hair ==
The larvae, partly the adult butterflies, are covered with urticating hair. These caterpillars release poison if touched, which can trigger skin irritation and, in some cases, more serious complications. The larvae tend to rest in tight junctions on tree trunks and are well camouflaged, making accidental contact likely.

== Distribution ==
The detailed distribution of this species is not known.
