= Lepidopterists' Society =

- Formation: 1947
- Purpose: Scientific study of Lepidoptera
- Headquarters: United States
- Region served: International
- Main organ: Journal of the Lepidopterists' Society
- Website: www.lepsoc.org

The Lepidopterists' Society is a non-profit organization dedicated to the study of butterflies and moths (Lepidoptera). Founded in 1947 and based in the United States, it has an international focus and membership.

== Publications ==
The society's main organ is the Journal of the Lepidopterists' Society, which has been published continuously since 1947. Back issues up and including 2009 are freely available and hosted by the Peabody Museum of Natural History at Yale University. Subsequent issues are available via BioOne.

Since 1959, the society has also published a quarterly newsletter, the News of the Lepidopterists' Society. All back issues of this, too, are available from the Peabody Museum.

A series of occasional papers is called Memoirs:

- Memoir 1. A Synonymic List of the Nearctic Rhophalocera. C. F. dos Passos, 1964
- Memoir 2. A Catalogue/Checklist of the Butterflies of America North of Mexico. L. D. Miller and F. M. Brown, 1981.
- Memoir 3. Supplement to: A Catalogue/Checklist of the Butterflies of America North of Mexico. C. D. Ferris (ed.), 1989
- Memoir 4. Foodplants of World Saturniidae. S. E. Stone, 1991
- Memoir 5. Basic Techniques for Observing and Studying Moths and Butterflies. W. D. Winter, Jr., 2000

They are also available via the Peabody.

Other publications include:

- The Lepidopterists' Society Commemorative Volume 1945-1973. R. Kendall (compiler), 1977

== Presidents ==
The society's first president, in 1951, was James Halliday McDunnough of the Nova Scotia Museum of Science. The next year, he was succeeded by the German-British entomologist Karl Jordan, of the Zoological Museum, Tring, England. The president for 2018-2019 is Brian Scholtens.

== Awards ==
The society awards a Karl Jordan Medal, initiated in 1972, in honor of Jordan. The first recipient was Henri Stempffer.

A full list of recipients is:

- 1973: Henri Stempfer
- 1974: Frederick Stehr
- 1977: Donald R. Davis
- 1979: John Frederick Gates Clarke
- 1980: Keith S. Brown Jr.
- 1982: Jerry A. Powell
- 1983: Elwood Curtin Zimmerman
- 1978: Pierre E.L. Viette
- 1984: David Francis Hardwick
- 1985: John Neville Eliot
- 1986: Frederick H. Rindge
- 1988: Niels Peder Kristensen
- 1989: Phillip R. Ackery and Richard I. Vane-Wright
- 1990: Ebbe Schmidt Nielsen
- 1995: Jeremy Daniel Holloway
- 1996: Ian Francis Bell Common
- 1997: Ronald Hodges
- 1999: Claude Lemaire
- 2000: Tosio Kumata
- 2002: Malcolm J. Scoble
- 2004: Eugene G. Munroe
- 2006: No award
- 2008: Gaden S. Robinson
- 2011: J. Donald Lafontaine
- 2013: James S. Miller
- 2015: Ted Edwards
- 2017: Philip James DeVries
- 2019: Marianne Horak

The society also grants honorary life memberships, such as that conferred on Lincoln Brower.
