= Xanthodirphia abbreviata =

Scientific classification
- Kingdom: Animalia
- Phylum: Arthropoda
- Class: Insecta
- Order: Lepidoptera
- Family: Saturniidae
- Genus: Xanthodirphia
- Species: X. abbreviata

Binomial name
- Xanthodirphia abbreviata Becker & Chacón, 2001

Species of moth

Xanthodirphia abbreviata is a species of moth in the family Saturniidae. It is found in Costa Rica.
