= Cinommata =

Scientific classification
- Kingdom: Animalia
- Phylum: Arthropoda
- Class: Insecta
- Order: Lepidoptera
- Family: Saturniidae
- Subfamily: Hemileucinae
- Genus: Cinommata; Butler, 1882

Genus of moths

Cinommata is a genus of moths in the family Saturniidae first described by Arthur Gardiner Butler in 1882.

== Species ==
- Cinommata bistrigata Butler, 1882
