= Eubergioides =

Scientific classification
- Kingdom: Animalia
- Phylum: Arthropoda
- Class: Insecta
- Order: Lepidoptera
- Family: Saturniidae
- Subfamily: Hemileucinae
- Genus: Eubergioides; Michener, 1949

Genus of moths

Eubergioides is a genus of moths in the family Saturniidae first described by Charles Duncan Michener in 1949.

== Species ==
- Eubergioides bertha (Schaus, 1896)
