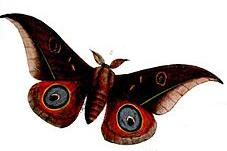

Scientific classification
- Kingdom: Animalia
- Phylum: Arthropoda
- Class: Insecta
- Order: Lepidoptera
- Family: Saturniidae
- Genus: Leucanella
- Species: L. janeira

Binomial name
- Leucanella janeira (Westwood, 1854)

Synonyms
- Saturnia janeira Westwood, 1854

= Leucanella janeira =

Species of moth

Leucanella janeira is a species of moth in the family Saturniidae first described by John O. Westwood in 1854. It is found in South America, including Brazil.
