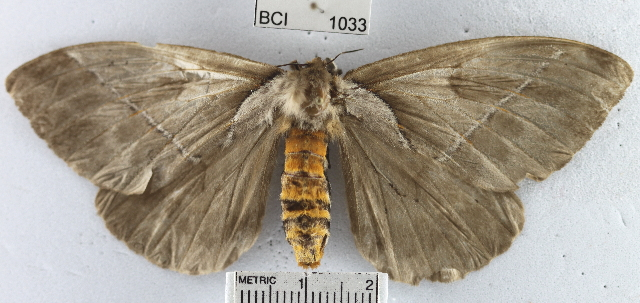

Scientific classification
- Kingdom: Animalia
- Phylum: Arthropoda
- Class: Insecta
- Order: Lepidoptera
- Family: Saturniidae
- Genus: Pseudodirphia
- Species: P. eumedide

Binomial name
- Pseudodirphia eumedide (Stoll, 1782)

Synonyms
- Phalaena eumedide Stoll, [1782]

= Pseudodirphia eumedide =

Species of moth

Pseudodirphia eumedide is a moth of the family Saturniidae first described by Caspar Stoll in 1782. It is found in Suriname, French Guiana, Peru, Venezuela and Panama.
