= Eudyaria =

Scientific classification
- Domain: Eukaryota
- Kingdom: Animalia
- Phylum: Arthropoda
- Class: Insecta
- Order: Lepidoptera
- Family: Saturniidae
- Subfamily: Hemileucinae
- Genus: Eudyaria; Dyar, 1898

Genus of moths

Eudyaria is a genus of moths in the family Saturniidae first described by Harrison Gray Dyar Jr. in 1898.

== Species ==
- Eudyaria venata (Butler, 1871)
- Eudyaria zeta (Berg, 1885)
