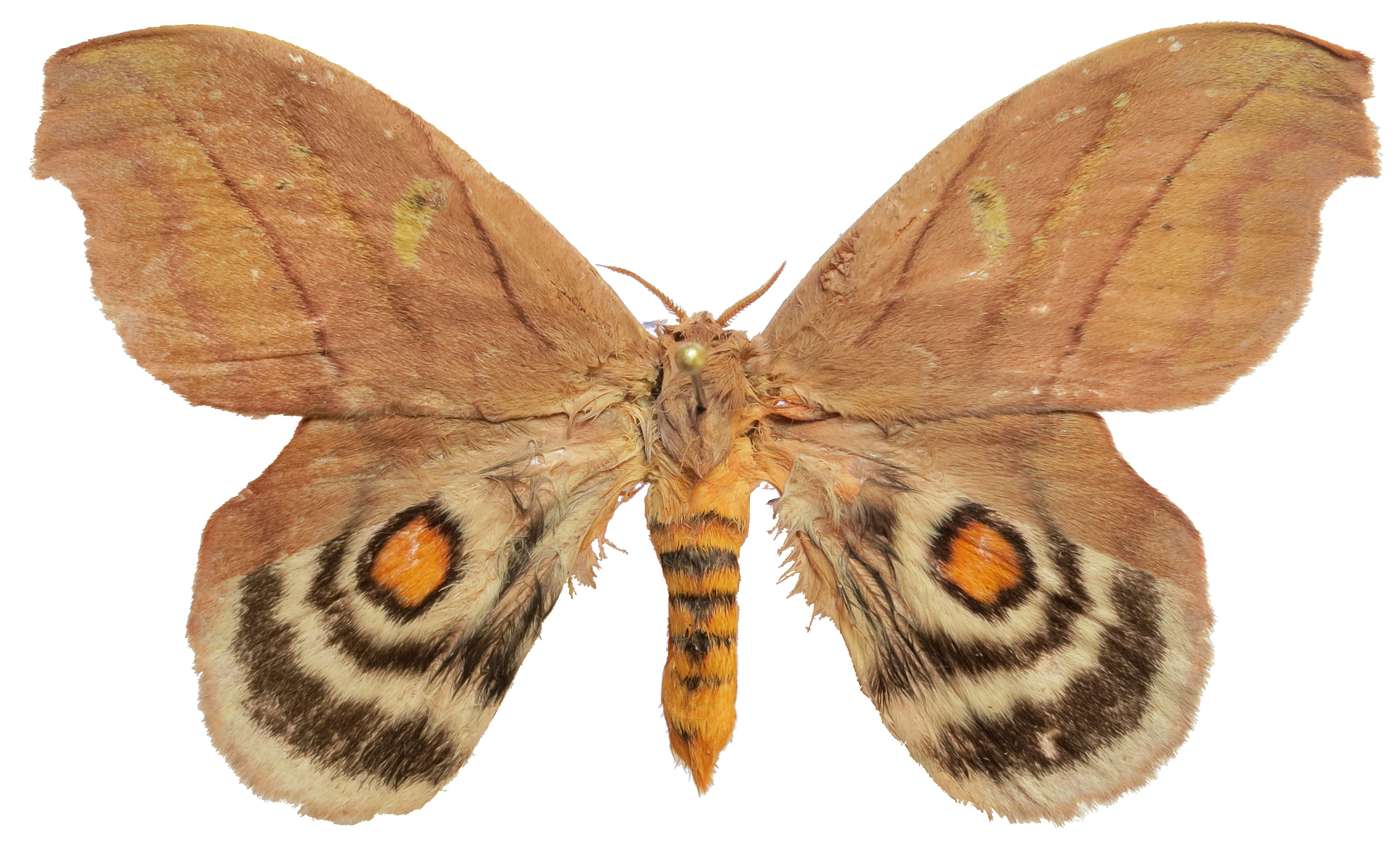
- Hyperchiria nausica

Scientific classification
- Domain: Eukaryota
- Kingdom: Animalia
- Phylum: Arthropoda
- Class: Insecta
- Order: Lepidoptera
- Family: Saturniidae
- Subfamily: Hemileucinae
- Genus: Hyperchiria; Hübner, 1819

Species
- See text

= Hyperchiria =

Genus of moths

Hyperchiria is a genus of moths in the family Saturniidae first described by Jacob Hübner in 1819.

== Species ==
The genus includes the following species:

- Hyperchiria acuta (Conte, 1906)
- Hyperchiria acutapex Brechlin & Meister, 2010
- Hyperchiria aniris (Jordan, 1910)
- Hyperchiria australoacuta Brechlin & Meister, 2010
- Hyperchiria carabobensis Brechlin & Meister, 2010
- Hyperchiria columbiana Brechlin & Meister, 2010
- Hyperchiria cuscoincisoides Brechlin & Meister, 2010
- Hyperchiria extremapex Brechlin & Meister, 2010
- Hyperchiria guetemalensis Brechlin & Meister, 2010
- Hyperchiria incisa Walker, 1855
- Hyperchiria incisoides Brechlin & Meister, 2010
- Hyperchiria jinotegaensis Brechlin & Meister, 2010
- Hyperchiria meridaensis Brechlin & Meister, 2010
- Hyperchiria misionincisoides Brechlin & Meister, 2010
- Hyperchiria nausica (Cramer, 1779)
- Hyperchiria nausioccidentalis Brechlin & Meister, 2010
- Hyperchiria orodina (Schaus, 1906)
- Hyperchiria plicata (Herrich-Schaeffer, 1855)
- Hyperchiria sanjuensis Brechlin & Meister, 2010
- Hyperchiria schmiti Meister & Storke, 2004
