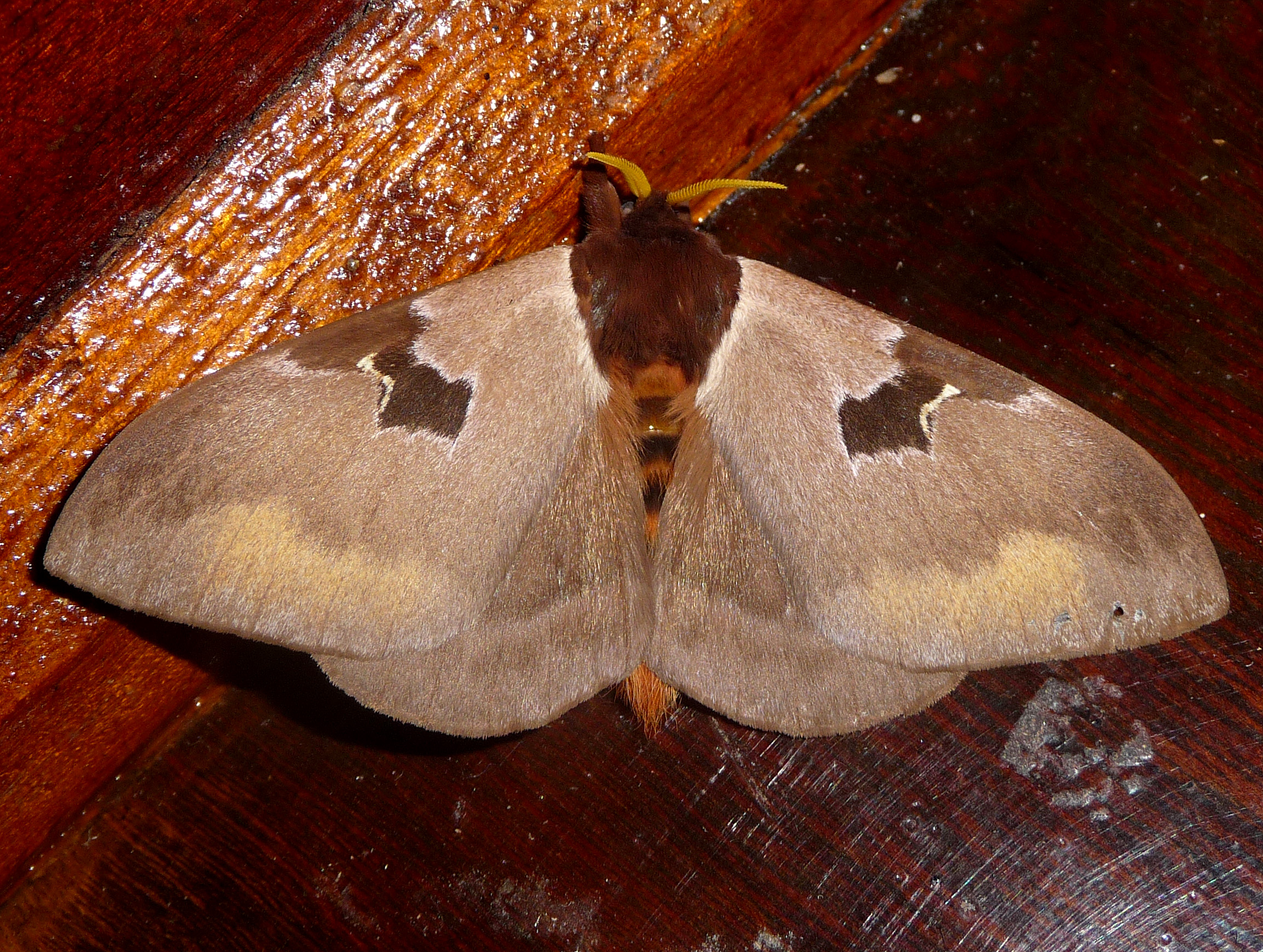
- D. fraterna male
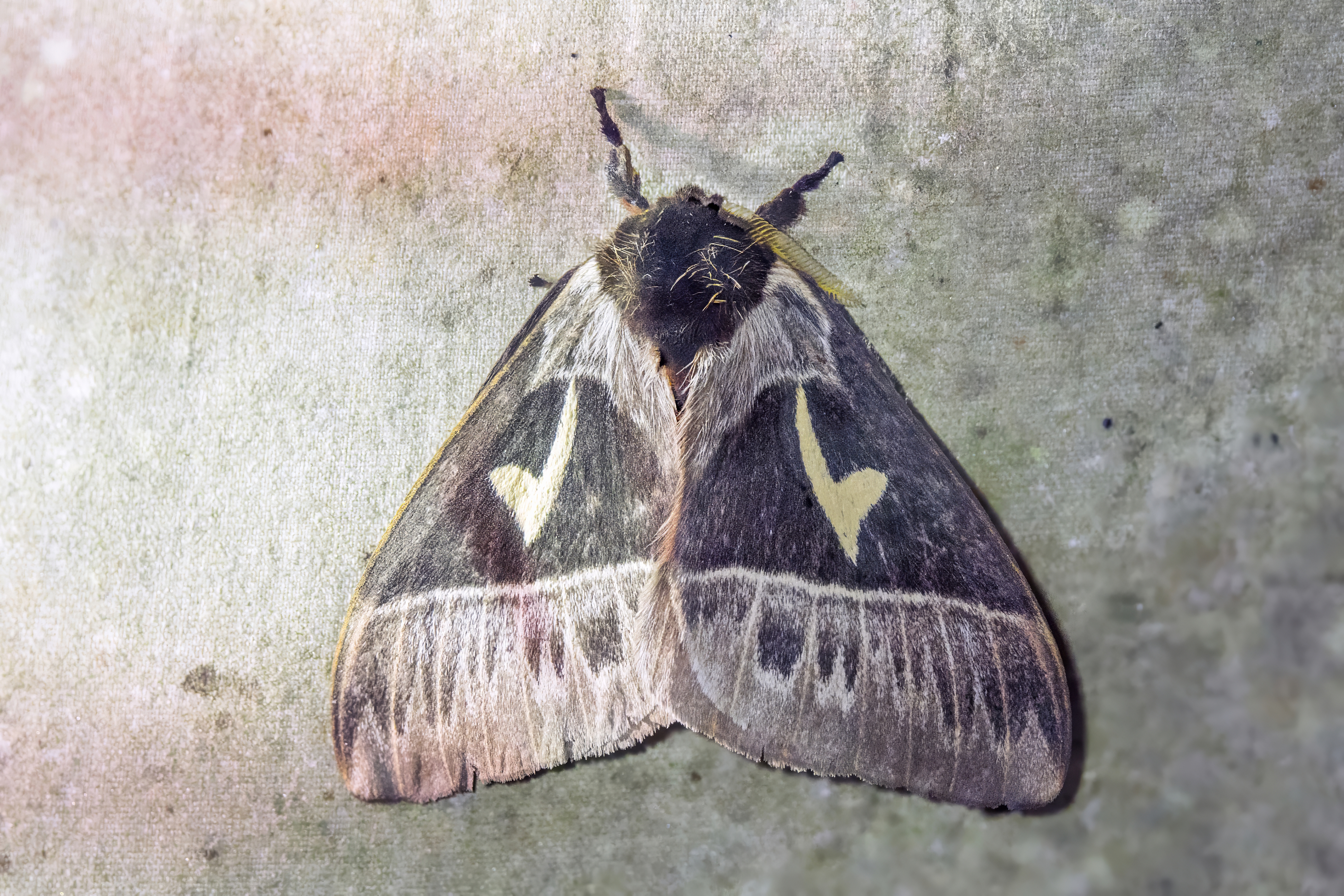
- D. brevifurca, male

Scientific classification
- Domain: Eukaryota
- Kingdom: Animalia
- Phylum: Arthropoda
- Class: Insecta
- Order: Lepidoptera
- Family: Saturniidae
- Subfamily: Hemileucinae
- Genus: Dirphia; Hübner, 1819

Species
- See text

Synonyms
- Phricodia Hübner, [1820]

= Dirphia =

Genus of moths

Dirphia is a genus of moths in the family Saturniidae first described by Jacob Hübner in 1819.

== Species ==
The genus includes the following species:

- Dirphia abhorca Lemaire, 1969
- Dirphia acidalia Hübner, 1819
- Dirphia aculea Vuillot, 1892
- Dirphia albescens Brechlin & Meister, 2008
- Dirphia araucariae E.D. Jones, 1908
- Dirphia avia (Stoll, 1780)
- Dirphia avrilae Lemaire, 1980
- Dirphia barinasensis Meister & Wenczel, 2002
- Dirphia baroma (Schaus, 1906)
- Dirphia brevifurca Strand, 1911
- Dirphia cadioui Lemaire, 1980
- Dirphia carimaguensis Decaens, Bonilla & Naumann, 2005
- Dirphia centralis F. Johnson & Michener, 1948
- Dirphia centrifurca Naumann, Brosch & Wenczel, 2005
- Dirphia crassifurca Lemaire, 1971
- Dirphia curitiba Draudt, 1930
- Dirphia demarmelsi Naumann, Brosch, Wenczel & Clavijo, 2005
- Dirphia dentimaculata (Schaus, 1921)
- Dirphia diasi (Lemaire, 1994)
- Dirphia docquinae Lemaire, 1993
- Dirphia dolosa Bouvier, 1929
- Dirphia fernandezi Lemaire, 1972
- Dirphia fornax (Druce, 1903)
- Dirphia fraterna (R. Felder & Rogenhofer, 1874)
- Dirphia horca Dognin, 1894
- Dirphia horcana Schaus, 1911
- Dirphia inexpectata L. & T. Racheli, 2005
- Dirphia irradians Lemaire, 1972
- Dirphia lemoulti Bouvier, 1930
- Dirphia lichyi Lemaire, 1971
- Dirphia ludmillae Lemaire, 1974
- Dirphia mielkeorum Naumann, Meister & Brosch, 2005
- Dirphia moderata Bouvier, 1929
- Dirphia monticola Zerny, 1924
- Dirphia muscosa Schaus, 1898
- Dirphia napoensis L. & T. Racheli, 2005
- Dirphia panamensis (Schaus, 1921)
- Dirphia proserpina Lemaire, 1982
- Dirphia radiata Dognin, 1916
- Dirphia rubricauda Bouvier, 1929
- Dirphia rufescens F. Johnson & Michener, 1948
- Dirphia sombrero Le Cerf, 1934
- Dirphia somniculosa (Cramer, 1777)
- Dirphia subhorca Dognin, 1901
- Dirphia tarquinia (Cramer, 1775)
- Dirphia thliptophana (R. Felder & Rogenhofer, 1874)
- Dirphia ursina Walker, 1855
