= Dirphia horcana =

Scientific classification
- Kingdom: Animalia
- Phylum: Arthropoda
- Clade: Pancrustacea
- Class: Insecta
- Order: Lepidoptera
- Family: Saturniidae
- Genus: Dirphia
- Species: D. horcana

Binomial name
- Dirphia horcana Schaus, 1911

Species of moth

Dirphia horcana is a moth of the family Saturniidae. It is found in Costa Rica and Panama.
