= Catharisa =

Scientific classification
- Domain: Eukaryota
- Kingdom: Animalia
- Phylum: Arthropoda
- Class: Insecta
- Order: Lepidoptera
- Family: Saturniidae
- Subfamily: Hemileucinae
- Genus: Catharisa; Jordan, 1911

Species of moth

Catharisa is a genus of moths in the family Saturniidae first described by Karl Jordan in 1911.

== Species ==
- Catharisa cerina Jordan, 1911
