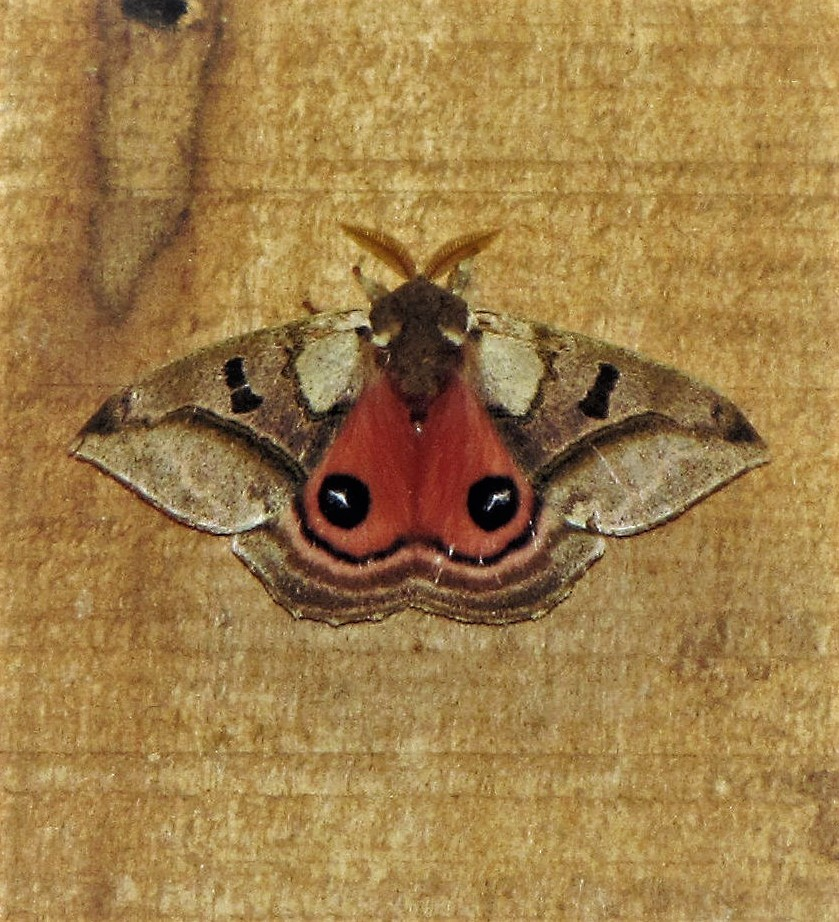
- Automerella aurora

Scientific classification
- Kingdom: Animalia
- Phylum: Arthropoda
- Clade: Pancrustacea
- Class: Insecta
- Order: Lepidoptera
- Family: Saturniidae
- Subfamily: Hemileucinae
- Genus: Automerella; Michener, 1949

= Automerella =

Genus of moths

Automerella is a genus of moths in the family Saturniidae first described by Charles Duncan Michener in 1949.

== Species ==
- Automerella aurora (Maassen & Weyding, 1885)
- Automerella flexuosa (R. Felder & Rogenhofer, 1874)
- Automerella miersi Lemaire & C. Mielke, 1998
