= Hypermerina =

Scientific classification
- Kingdom: Animalia
- Phylum: Arthropoda
- Class: Insecta
- Order: Lepidoptera
- Family: Saturniidae
- Subfamily: Hemileucinae
- Genus: Hypermerina; Lemaire, 1969

Genus of moths

Hypermerina is a genus of moths in the family Saturniidae. The genus was erected by Claude Lemaire in 1969.

== Species ==
- Hypermerina kasyi Lemaire, 1969
