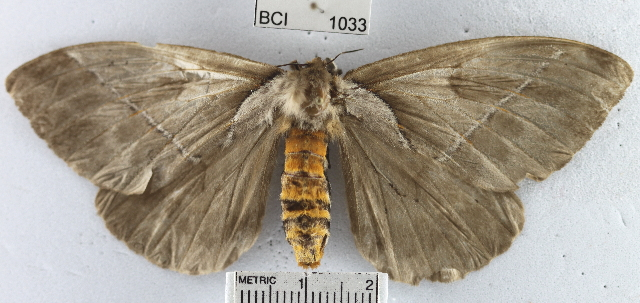
- Pseudodirphia eumedide

Scientific classification
- Domain: Eukaryota
- Kingdom: Animalia
- Phylum: Arthropoda
- Class: Insecta
- Order: Lepidoptera
- Family: Saturniidae
- Subfamily: Hemileucinae
- Genus: Pseudodirphia; Bouvier, 1928

Species
- See text

= Pseudodirphia =

Genus of moths

Pseudodirphia is a genus of moths in the family Saturniidae first described by Eugène Louis Bouvier in 1928.

== Species ==
The genus includes the following species:

- Pseudodirphia agis (Cramer, 1775)
- Pseudodirphia alba (Druce, 1911)
- Pseudodirphia albosignata (Bouvier, 1924)
- Pseudodirphia alticola Lemaire, 2002
- Pseudodirphia andicola Bouvier, 1930
- Pseudodirphia biremis (Draudt, 1930)
- Pseudodirphia boliviana Lampe, 2004
- Pseudodirphia catarinensis (Lemaire, 1975)
- Pseudodirphia choroniensis (Lemaire, 1975)
- Pseudodirphia conjuncta Lemaire, 2002
- Pseudodirphia cupripuncta Lemaire, 1982
- Pseudodirphia ducalis Lemaire, 2002
- Pseudodirphia eumedide (Stoll, 1782)
- Pseudodirphia eumedidoides (Vuillot, 1892)
- Pseudodirphia frickei Meister & Brechlin, 2008
- Pseudodirphia guyanensis (Lemaire, 1975)
- Pseudodirphia herbuloti (Lemaire, 1975)
- Pseudodirphia imperialis (Draudt, 1930)
- Pseudodirphia infuscata (Bouvier, 1924)
- Pseudodirphia lacsa Lemaire, 1996
- Pseudodirphia lesieuri Lemaire, 2002
- Pseudodirphia marxi Brechlin & Meister, 2008
- Pseudodirphia medinensis (Draudt, 1930)
- Pseudodirphia menander (Druce, 1886)
- Pseudodirphia mexicana (Bouvier, 1924)
- Pseudodirphia niceros (Dognin, 1911)
- Pseudodirphia obliqua (Bouvier, 1924)
- Pseudodirphia pallida (Walker, 1865)
- Pseudodirphia peruviana (Bouvier, 1924)
- Pseudodirphia regia (Draudt, 1930)
- Pseudodirphia sanctimartinensis Lemaire, 2002
- Pseudodirphia singeri Meister & Brechlin, 2008
- Pseudodirphia sinuosa Lemaire, 2002
- Pseudodirphia theodorici Lemaire, 1982
- Pseudodirphia thiaucourti Lemaire, 1982
- Pseudodirphia undulata Lemaire, 2002
- Pseudodirphia uniformis (Lemaire, 1975)
- Pseudodirphia varia (Walker, 1855)
- Pseudodirphia varioides Brechlin, 2018
- Pseudodirphia weritzi Brechlin & Meister, 2008
