= Ithomisa =

Scientific classification
- Domain: Eukaryota
- Kingdom: Animalia
- Phylum: Arthropoda
- Class: Insecta
- Order: Lepidoptera
- Family: Saturniidae
- Subfamily: Hemileucinae
- Genus: Ithomisa; Oberthür, 1881

Genus of moths

Ithomisa is a genus of moths in the family Saturniidae first described by Charles Oberthür in 1881.

== Species ==
- Ithomisa catherina (Schaus, 1896)
- Ithomisa kinkelini Ch. Oberthuer, 1881
- Ithomisa lepta (Druce, 1890)
- Ithomisa umbrata Oiticica Filho, 1958
