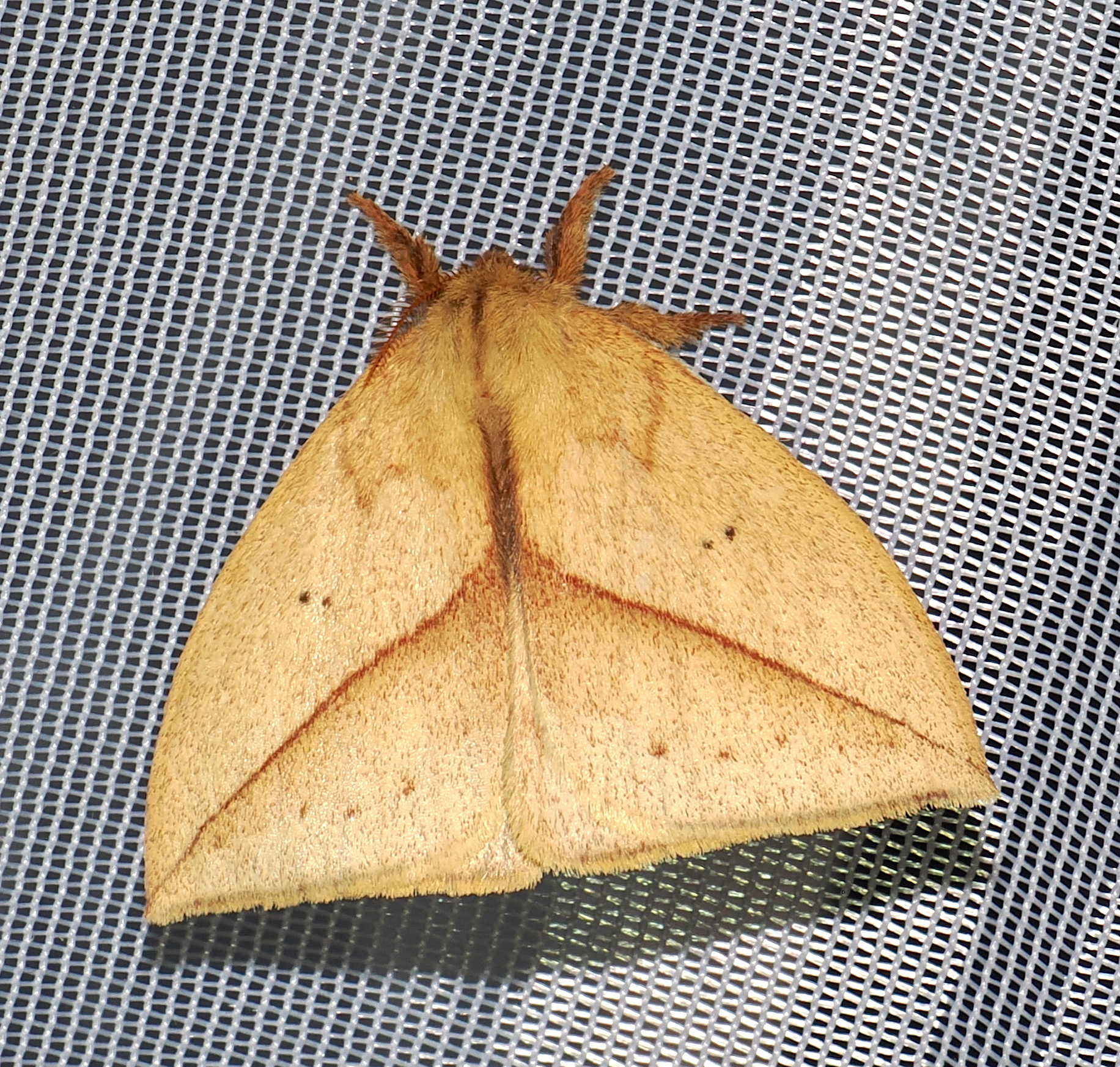
- Catacantha meta

Scientific classification
- Kingdom: Animalia
- Phylum: Arthropoda
- Clade: Pancrustacea
- Class: Insecta
- Order: Lepidoptera
- Family: Saturniidae
- Subfamily: Hemileucinae
- Genus: Catacantha; Bouvier, 1930

= Catacantha =

Genus of moths

Catacantha is a genus of moths in the family Saturniidae first described by Eugène Louis Bouvier in 1930.

== Species ==
- Catacantha evitae Brechlin & Meister & van Schayck, 2010
- Catacantha ferruginea (Draudt, 1929)
- Catacantha juliae Brechlin & Meister & van Schayck, 2010
- Catacantha latifasciata Bouvier, 1930
- Catacantha nataliae Brechlin & Meister & van Schayck, 2010
- Catacantha obliqua Bouvier, 1930
- Catacantha oculata (Schaus, 1921)
- Catacantha siriae Brechlin & Meister & van Schayck, 2010
- Catacantha sofiae Brechlin & Meister & van Schayck, 2010
- Catacantha stramentalis (Draudt, 1929)
- Catacantha tabeae Brechlin & Meister & van Schayck, 2010
