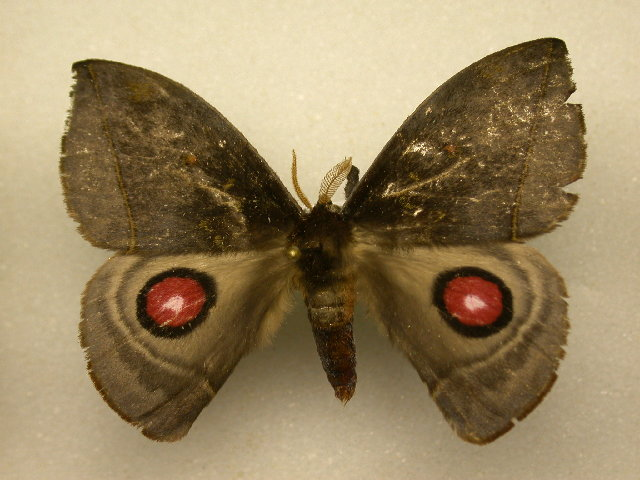

Scientific classification
- Domain: Eukaryota
- Kingdom: Animalia
- Phylum: Arthropoda
- Class: Insecta
- Order: Lepidoptera
- Family: Saturniidae
- Genus: Gamelia
- Species: G. septentrionalis

Binomial name
- Gamelia septentrionalis Bouvier, 1936

= Gamelia septentrionalis =

Species of moth

Gamelia septentrionalis is a moth of the family Saturniidae. It is found in Central America, including Costa Rica and Nicaragua.

The larvae feed on Guatteria diospyroides, Clethra unnata, Dipteryx panamensis, Inga species, Senna fruticosa and Miriocarpa longipes.
