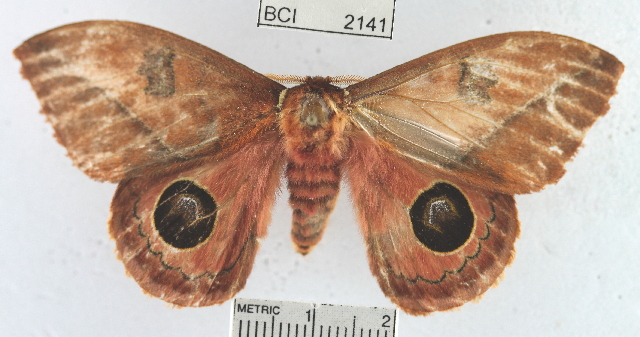

Scientific classification
- Kingdom: Animalia
- Phylum: Arthropoda
- Clade: Pancrustacea
- Class: Insecta
- Order: Lepidoptera
- Family: Saturniidae
- Genus: Pseudautomeris
- Species: P. salmonea

Binomial name
- Pseudautomeris salmonea (Cramer, [1777])

Synonyms
- Phalaena salmonea Cramer, [1777]

= Pseudautomeris salmonea =

Species of moth

Pseudautomeris salmonea is a moth of the family Saturniidae first described by Pieter Cramer in 1777. It is found in Suriname, Panama, French Guiana, Venezuela, Brazil and Colombia.
