= Dirphiella =

Scientific classification
- Domain: Eukaryota
- Kingdom: Animalia
- Phylum: Arthropoda
- Class: Insecta
- Order: Lepidoptera
- Family: Saturniidae
- Subfamily: Hemileucinae
- Genus: Dirphiella; Michener, 1949

Genus of moths

Dirphiella is a genus of moths in the family Saturniidae first described by Charles Duncan Michener in 1949.

== Species ==
- Dirphiella albofasciata (Johnson & Michener, 1948)
- Dirphiella niobe (Lemaire, 1978)
- Dirphiella taylori (Donahue & Lemaire, 1975)
