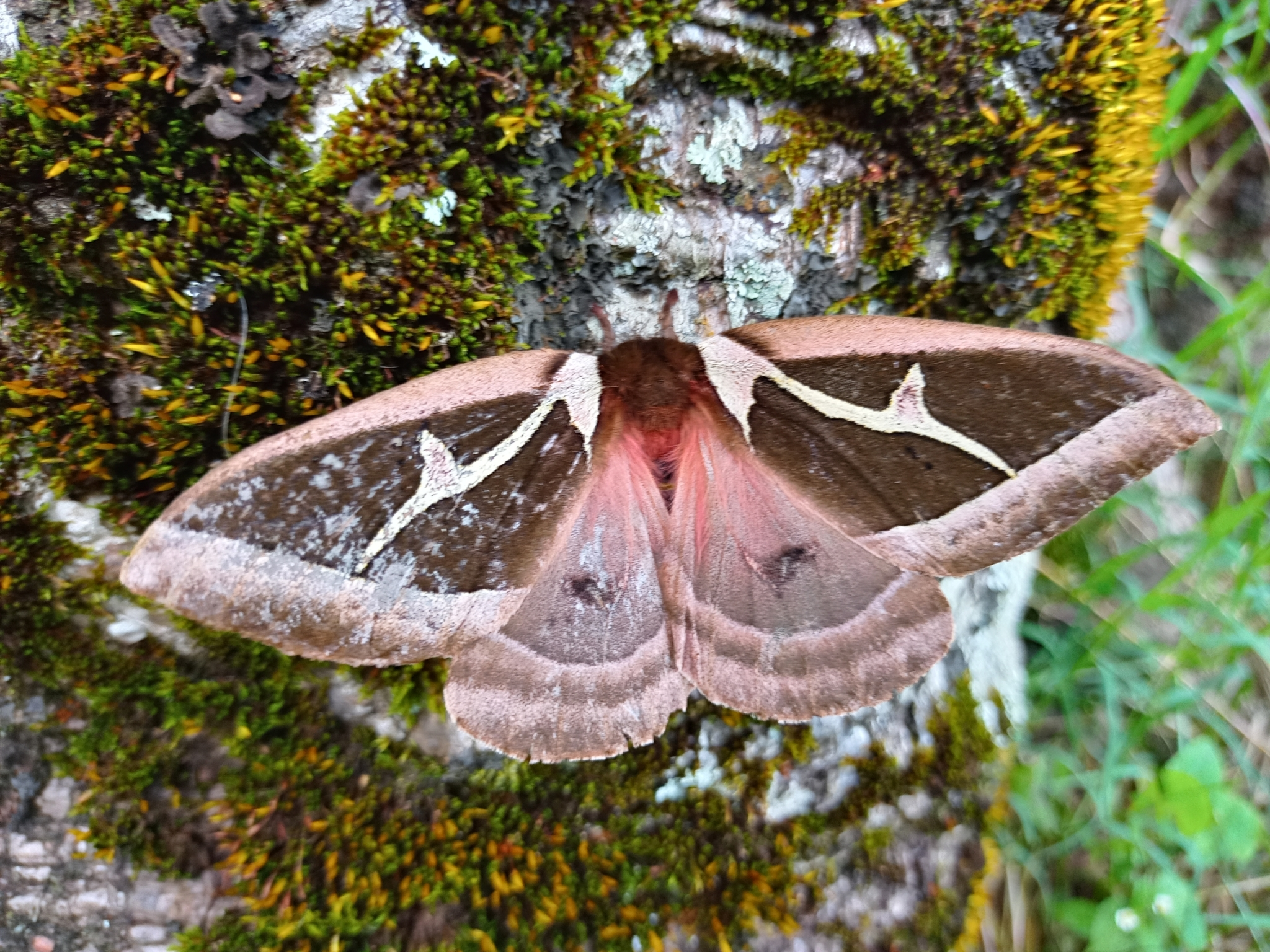
- Dirphiopsis multicolor

Scientific classification
- Domain: Eukaryota
- Kingdom: Animalia
- Phylum: Arthropoda
- Class: Insecta
- Order: Lepidoptera
- Family: Saturniidae
- Subfamily: Hemileucinae
- Genus: Dirphiopsis; Bouvier, 1928

= Dirphiopsis =

Genus of moths

Dirphiopsis is a genus of moths in the family Saturniidae first described by Eugène Louis Bouvier in 1928.

== Species ==
- Dirphiopsis ayuruoca (Foetterle, 1902)
- Dirphiopsis cochabambensis (Lemaire, 1977)
- Dirphiopsis curvilineata Decaens, Wolfe & Herbin, 2003
- Dirphiopsis delta (Foetterle, 1902)
- Dirphiopsis epiolina (R. Felder & Rogenhofer, 1874)
- Dirphiopsis flora (Schaus, 1911)
- Dirphiopsis herbini Wolfe, 2003
- Dirphiopsis janzeni Lemaire, 2002
- Dirphiopsis multicolor (Walker, 1855)
- Dirphiopsis oridocea (Schaus, 1924)
- Dirphiopsis picturata (Schaus, 1913)
- Dirphiopsis pulchricornis (Walker, 1855)
- Dirphiopsis schreiteri (Schaus, 1925)
- Dirphiopsis trisignata (R. Felder & Rogenhofer, 1874)
- Dirphiopsis undulinea (F. Johnson, 1937)
- Dirphiopsis unicolor Lemaire, 1982
- Dirphiopsis wanderbilti Pearson, 1958
- Dirphiopsis wolfei Lemaire, 1992
