= Gamelioides =

Scientific classification
- Kingdom: Animalia
- Phylum: Arthropoda
- Clade: Pancrustacea
- Class: Insecta
- Order: Lepidoptera
- Family: Saturniidae
- Subfamily: Hemileucinae
- Genus: Gamelioides; Lemaire, 1988

Genus of moths

Gamelioides is a genus of moths in the family Saturniidae first described by Claude Lemaire in 1988.

== Species ==
- Gamelioides deniseae Naumann, Brosch & Wenczel, 2005
- Gamelioides elainae (Lemaire, 1967)
- Gamelioides kattyae Brechlin & Kaech & Meister, 2010
- Gamelioides meisteri Brechlin, 2010
- Gamelioides seitzi (Draudt, 1929)
