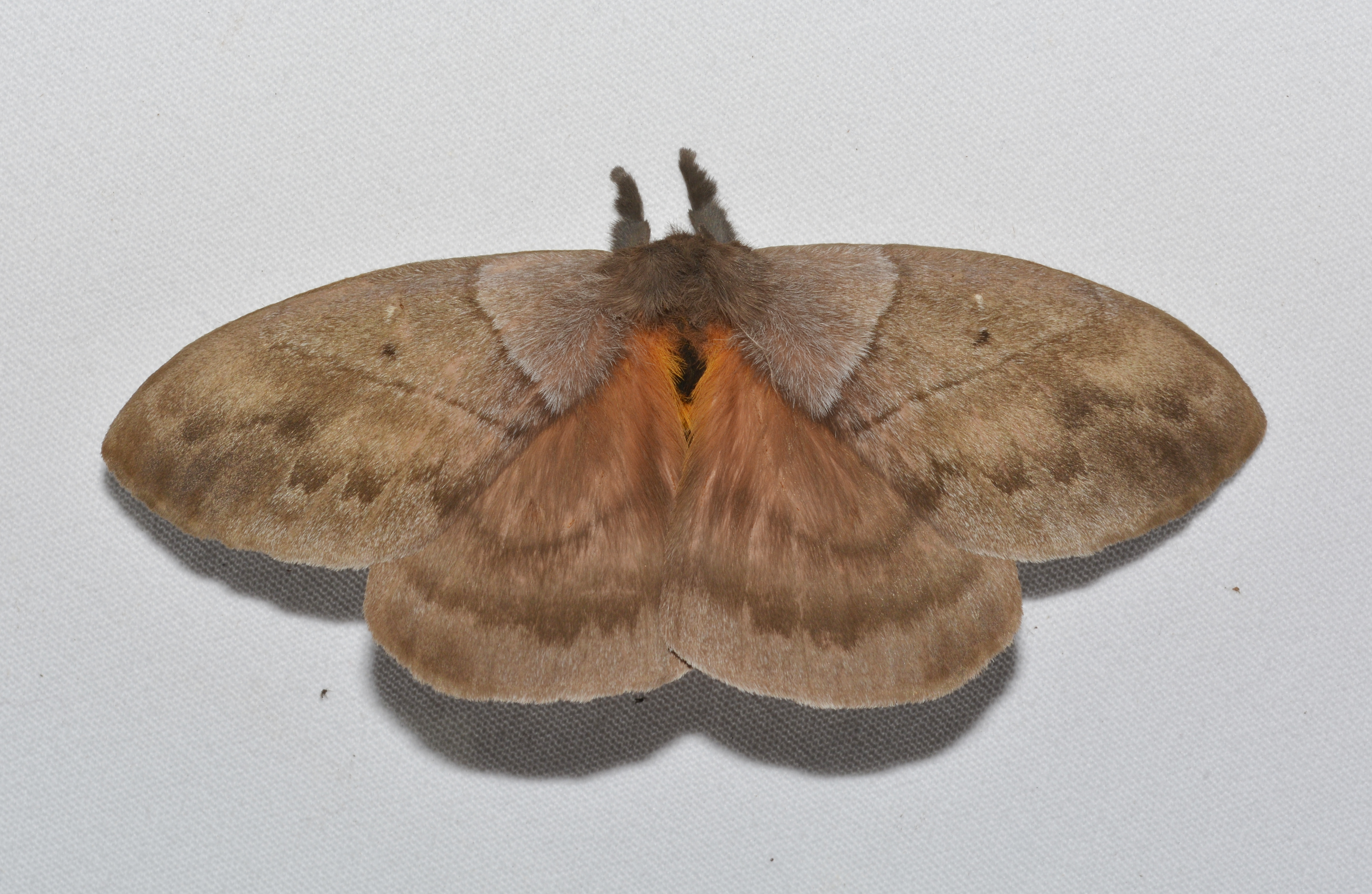
- Periphoba hircia

Scientific classification
- Domain: Eukaryota
- Kingdom: Animalia
- Phylum: Arthropoda
- Class: Insecta
- Order: Lepidoptera
- Family: Saturniidae
- Subfamily: Hemileucinae
- Genus: Periphoba; Hübner, 1820

Species
- See text

= Periphoba =

Genus of moths

Periphoba is a genus of moths in the family Saturniidae first described by Jacob Hübner in 1820.

== Species ==
The genus includes the following species:

- Periphoba albata (Draudt, 1930)
- Periphoba arcaei (Druce, 1886)
- Periphoba attali Lemaire & Terral, 1994
- Periphoba augur (Bouvier, 1929)
- Periphoba aurata Lemaire, 1994
- Periphoba campisi C. Mielke, Ciseski & Naumann, 2020
- Periphoba courtini Lemaire, 1994
- Periphoba galmeidai Mielke & Furtado, 2006
- Periphoba hidalgensis Brechlin & Meister, 2010
- Periphoba hircia (Cramer, 1775)
- Periphoba moseri Mielke & Furtado, 2006
- Periphoba nigra (Dognin, 1901)
- Periphoba ockendeni Lemaire, 1995
- Periphoba parallela (Schaus, 1921)
- Periphoba pascoensis Brechlin & Meister, 2010
- Periphoba pessoai Mielke & Furtado, 2006
- Periphoba porioni Lemaire, 1982
- Periphoba punoensis Brechlin & Meister, 2010
- Periphoba rudloffi Brechlin & Meister, 2010
- Periphoba tangerini Mielke & Furtado, 2006
- Periphoba tarapoto Lemaire, 2002
- Periphoba tolimaiana Brechlin & Meister, 2010
- Periphoba unicolor (Lemaire, 1977)
- Periphoba yungasiana Brechlin & Meister, 2010
