= Hirpida =

Scientific classification
- Domain: Eukaryota
- Kingdom: Animalia
- Phylum: Arthropoda
- Class: Insecta
- Order: Lepidoptera
- Family: Saturniidae
- Subfamily: Hemileucinae
- Genus: Hirpida; Draudt, 1929

Genus of moths

Hirpida is a genus of moths in the family Saturniidae first described by Max Wilhelm Karl Draudt in 1929.

== Species ==
- Hirpida boloviochoba Brechlin & Meister, 2010
- Hirpida choba (Druce, 1904)
- Hirpida chuquisaciana Brechlin & Meister, 2010
- Hirpida gaujoni (Dognin, 1894)
- Hirpida junopascoensis Brechlin & Meister, 2010
- Hirpida juyjuylinea Brechlin & Meister, 2010
- Hirpida levis (F. Johnson & Michener, 1948)
- Hirpida levocuscoensis Brechlin & Meister, 2010
- Hirpida levopascoensis Brechlin & Meister, 2010
- Hirpida mavanschaycki Brechlin & Meister, 2010
- Hirpida nigrolinea (Druce, 1904)
- Hirpida olgae Brechlin & Meister, 2010
- Hirpida pomacochasensis Brechlin & Meister, 2010
- Hirpida santacruziana Brechlin & Meister, 2010
- Hirpida sinjaevorum Brechlin & Meister, 2010
