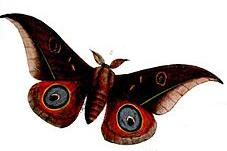
- Leucanella janeira

Scientific classification
- Domain: Eukaryota
- Kingdom: Animalia
- Phylum: Arthropoda
- Class: Insecta
- Order: Lepidoptera
- Family: Saturniidae
- Subfamily: Hemileucinae
- Genus: Leucanella; Lemaire, 1969

= Leucanella =

Genus of moths

Leucanella is a genus of moths in the family Saturniidae first described by Claude Lemaire in 1969.

== Species ==
The genus includes the following species:

- Leucanella acutissima (Walker, 1865)
- Leucanella anikae Meister & Brechlin, 2002
- Leucanella apollinairei (Dognin, 1923)
- Leucanella aspera (R. Felder & Rogenhofer, 1874)
- Leucanella atahualpa Meister & Naumann, 2006
- Leucanella bivius (Bouvier, 1927)
- Leucanella contei (Lemaire, 1967)
- Leucanella contempta (Lemaire, 1967)
- Leucanella flammans (Schaus, 1900)
- Leucanella fusca (Walker, 1855)
- Leucanella gibbosa (Conte, 1906)
- Leucanella heisleri (E. D. Jones, 1908)
- Leucanella hosmera (Schaus, 1941)
- Leucanella janeira (Westwood, 1854)
- Leucanella lama (Berg, 1883)
- Leucanella leucane (Geyer, 1837)
- Leucanella lynx (Bouvier, 1930)
- Leucanella maasseni (Moeschler, 1872)
- Leucanella memusae (Walker, 1855)
- Leucanella memusoides Lemaire, 1973
- Leucanella muelleri (Draudt, 1929)
- Leucanella newmani (Lemaire, 1967)
- Leucanella nyctimene (Latreille, 1832)
- Leucanella saturata (Walker, 1855)
- Leucanella stuarti (W. Rothschild & Jordan, 1901)
- Leucanella viettei (Lemaire, 1967)
- Leucanella viridescens (Walker, 1855)
- Leucanella yungasensis Meister & Naumann, 2006
