= Automeropsis =

Scientific classification
- Domain: Eukaryota
- Kingdom: Animalia
- Phylum: Arthropoda
- Class: Insecta
- Order: Lepidoptera
- Family: Saturniidae
- Subfamily: Hemileucinae
- Genus: Automeropsis; Lemaire, 1969

Genus of moths

Automeropsis is a genus of moths in the family Saturniidae first described by Claude Lemaire in 1969.

== Species ==
- Automeropsis umbrata (Boisduval, 1875)
