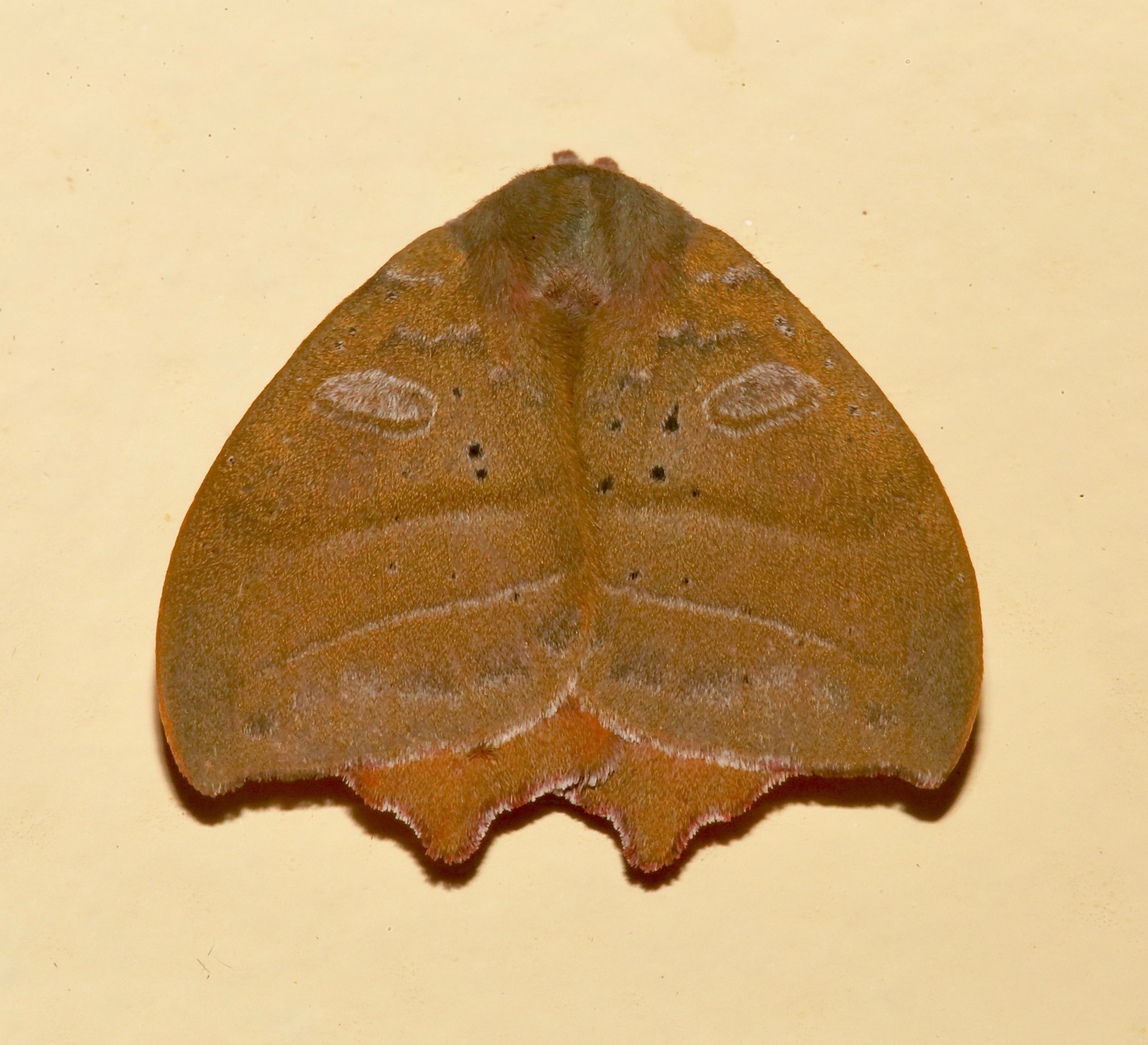
- Automerina caudatula

Scientific classification
- Kingdom: Animalia
- Phylum: Arthropoda
- Clade: Pancrustacea
- Class: Insecta
- Order: Lepidoptera
- Family: Saturniidae
- Subfamily: Hemileucinae
- Genus: Automerina; Michener, 1949

= Automerina =

Genus of moths

Automerina is a genus of moths in the family Saturniidae first described by Charles Duncan Michener in 1949.

== Species ==
- Automerina auletes (Herrich-Schaeffer, 1854)
- Automerina beneluzi Lemaire, 2002
- Automerina carina Meister, Naumann & Brechlin, 2005
- Automerina caudatula (R. Felder & Rogenhofer, 1874)
- Automerina cypria (Gmelin, 1790)
- Automerina vala (Kirby, 1871)
