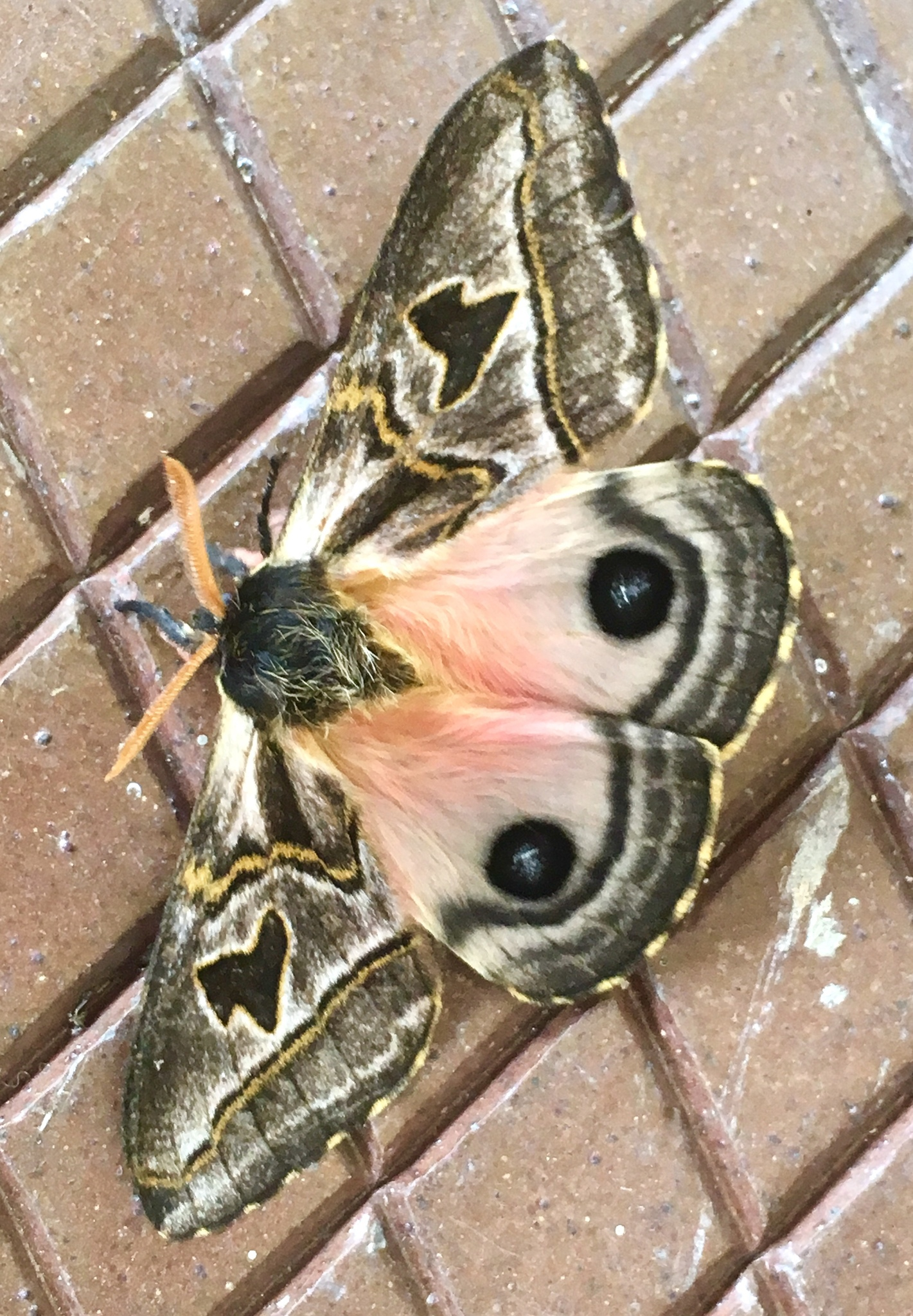
- Erythromeris saturniata

Scientific classification
- Domain: Eukaryota
- Kingdom: Animalia
- Phylum: Arthropoda
- Class: Insecta
- Order: Lepidoptera
- Family: Saturniidae
- Subfamily: Hemileucinae
- Genus: Erythromeris; Lemaire, 1969

= Erythromeris =

Genus of moths

Erythromeris is a genus of moths in the family Saturniidae.

== Species ==
- Erythromeris flexilineata (Dognin, 1911)
- Erythromeris obscurior Lemaire, 1975
- Erythromeris saturniata (Walker, 1865)
