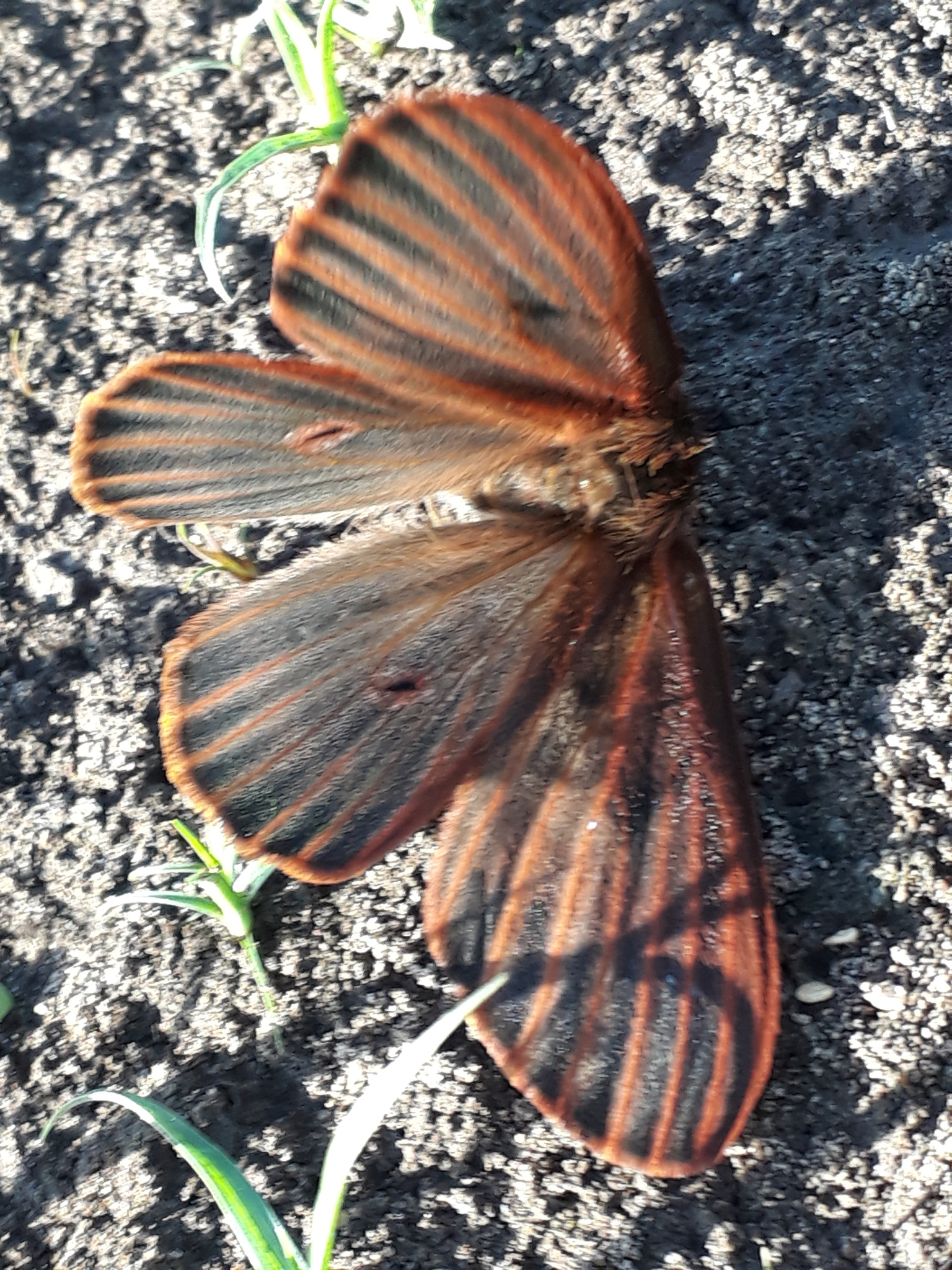
- Female

Scientific classification
- Domain: Eukaryota
- Kingdom: Animalia
- Phylum: Arthropoda
- Class: Insecta
- Order: Lepidoptera
- Family: Saturniidae
- Genus: Heliconisa; Walker, 1855
- Species: H. pagenstecheri

Binomial name
- Heliconisa pagenstecheri (Geyer, 1835)

= Heliconisa =

Genus of moths

Heliconisa is a monotypic moth genus in the family Saturniidae erected by Francis Walker in 1855. Its single species, Heliconisa pagenstecheri, was first described by Carl Geyer in 1835.
