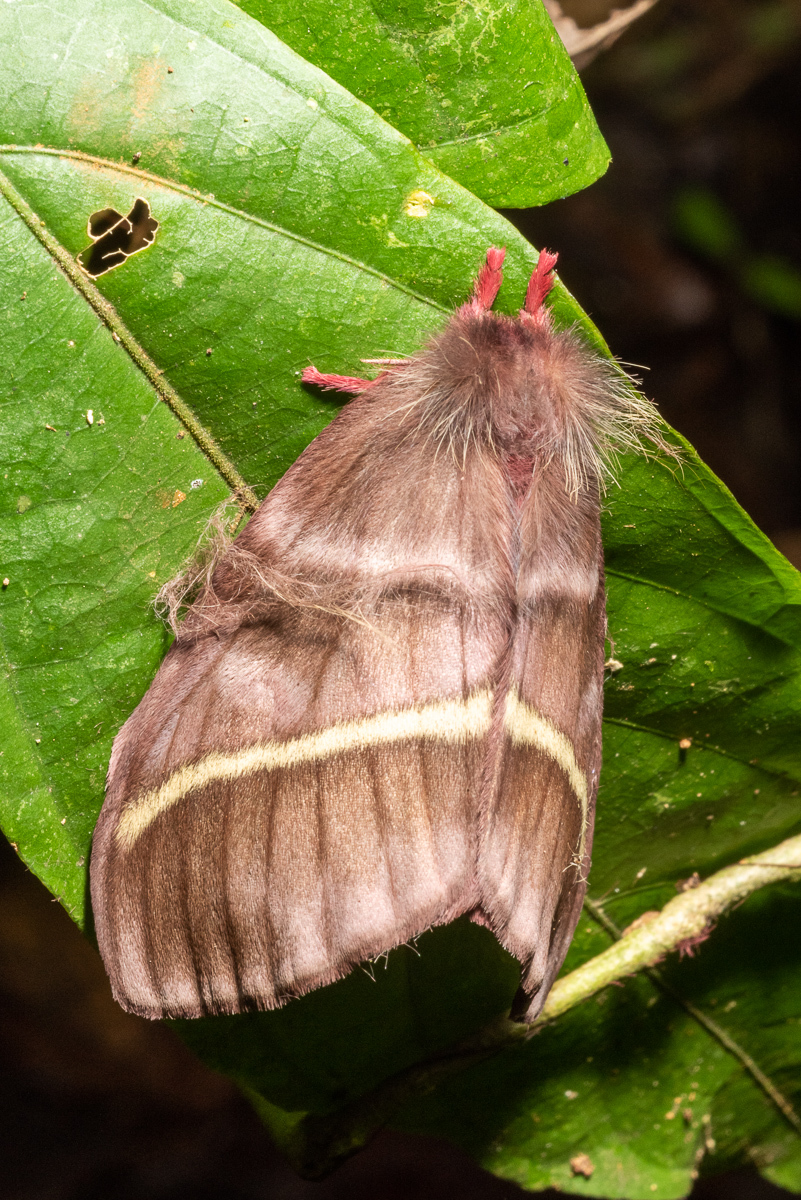

Scientific classification
- Domain: Eukaryota
- Kingdom: Animalia
- Phylum: Arthropoda
- Class: Insecta
- Order: Lepidoptera
- Family: Saturniidae
- Genus: Hylesiopsis; Bouvier, 1929
- Species: H. festiva

Binomial name
- Hylesiopsis festiva Bouvier, 1929

= Hylesiopsis =

Hylesiopsis festiva

Genus of moths

Hylesiopsis is a genus of moths in the family Saturniidae first described by Eugène Louis Bouvier in 1929. It is monotypic, being represented by the single species Hylesiopsis festiva.
