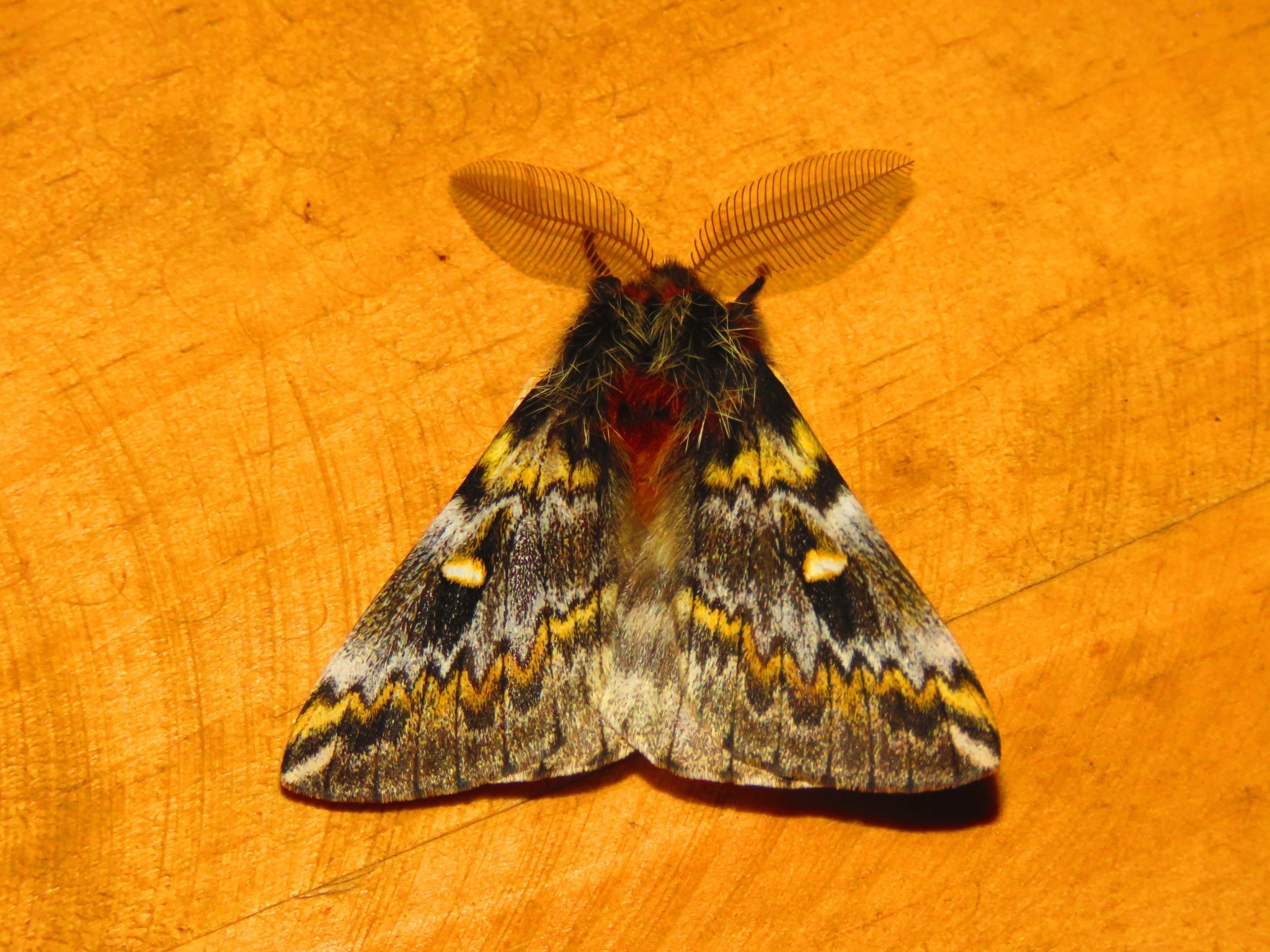
- Ormiscodes schmidtnielseni

Scientific classification
- Domain: Eukaryota
- Kingdom: Animalia
- Phylum: Arthropoda
- Class: Insecta
- Order: Lepidoptera
- Family: Saturniidae
- Subfamily: Hemileucinae
- Genus: Ormiscodes; Blanchard, 1852

Synonyms
- Catocephales Bouvier, 1928

= Ormiscodes =

Genus of moths

Ormiscodes is a genus of moths in the family Saturniidae first described by Blanchard in 1852.

== Species ==
- Ormiscodes amphinome (Fabricius, 1775)
- Ormiscodes bruchi (Koehler, 1930)
- Ormiscodes cinnamomea (Feisthamel, 1839)
- Ormiscodes cognata Philippi, 1859
- Ormiscodes eugeniae Brechlin & Meister, 2010
- Ormiscodes joiceyi (Draudt, 1930)
- Ormiscodes lauta (Berg, 1881)
- Ormiscodes nigrolutea (Bouvier, 1924)
- Ormiscodes nigrosignata (Philippi, 1859)
- Ormiscodes penai Lemaire & Parra, 1995
- Ormiscodes rufosignata (Blanchard, 1852)
- Ormiscodes schmidtnielseni Lemaire, 1985
- Ormiscodes shapiroi Lemaire, 1978
- Ormiscodes socialis (Feisthamel, 1839)
