= Eugène Louis Bouvier =

French entomologist and carcinologist

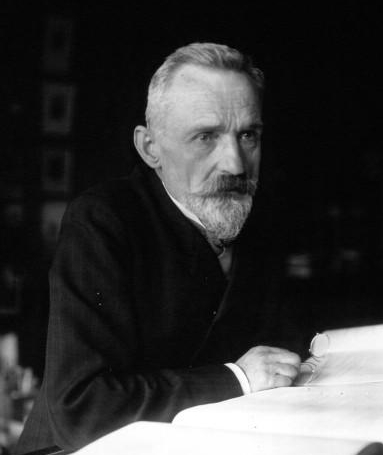
Eugène Louis Bouvier (1856–1944)

Eugène Louis Bouvier (9 April 1856 in Saint-Laurent-en-Grandvaux – 14 January 1944 in Paris) was a French entomologist and carcinologist. Bouvier was a professor at the Muséum national d'histoire naturelle.

== Biography ==
Following graduation at the normal school in Lons-le-Saunier, he taught classes in Clairvaux, Versailles, Saint-Cloud, and Villefranche-sur-Saône. From 1882 to 1887, he served as a boursier at the Muséum national d'histoire naturelle, where he studied with Alphonse Milne-Edwards (1835–1900) and Edmond Perrier (1844–1921). Together with Milne-Edwards, he worked on some of the crustaceans from the Travailleur and Talisman expeditions (1880–1883).

In 1887, he earned his doctorate in natural sciences with a dissertation involving prosobranch gastropods, Système nerveux, morphologie générale et classification des Gastéropodes prosobranches. In 1889, he became an associate professor at the Ecole supérieure de pharmacie de Paris, and in 1895, he attained a professorship of natural history (chair of "articulated animals"; starting in 1917, it was referred to as the chair of entomology) at the muséum. Bouvier maintained the chair of entomology until 1931, when he was succeeded by René Jeannel (1879–1965).

His earlier studies dealt with evolution of various species, in particular crustaceans and mollusks.

== Works ==
- Recherches sur les affinités des Lithodes & des Lomis avec les Paguridés (1895) – Studies on the closer relationships of the king crab Lithodes and Lomis with pagurid hermit crabs.
- Nouvelles observations sur les glaucothoés (1905) – New Observations on Glaucothoe (larvae).
- [Vie psychique des insectes] (1918) – The Psychic Life of Insects (translated, 1922).
- Habitudes et Métamorphoses des insectes (1919) – Behavior and Metamorphosis of Insects.
- Le Communisme chez les insectes (1926) – Communism Among Insects.
- Monographie des lépidoptères saturnides (1934) – Monograph of Lepidoptera, Saturniidae.
- Décapodes marcheurs de la faune de France (1940) – Decapoda of France.

== Legacy ==
Taxa named after Bouvier include:

- Procambarus bouvieri, a crayfish
- Hemidactylus bouvieri, a leaf-toed gecko
- Rissoina bouvieri, a sea snail
- Eumetula bouvieri, a sea snail
- Procolobus bouvieri, a monkey
- Cyphocaris bouvieri, an amphipod
- Cinnyris bouvieri, a sunbird
- Scotopelia bouvieri, a fishing owl
- Procambarus bouvieri, a crayfish
- Messor bouvieri, an ant
- Peripatus bouvieri, a velvet worm

== See also ==
- List of Chairs of the Muséum national d'histoire naturelle
