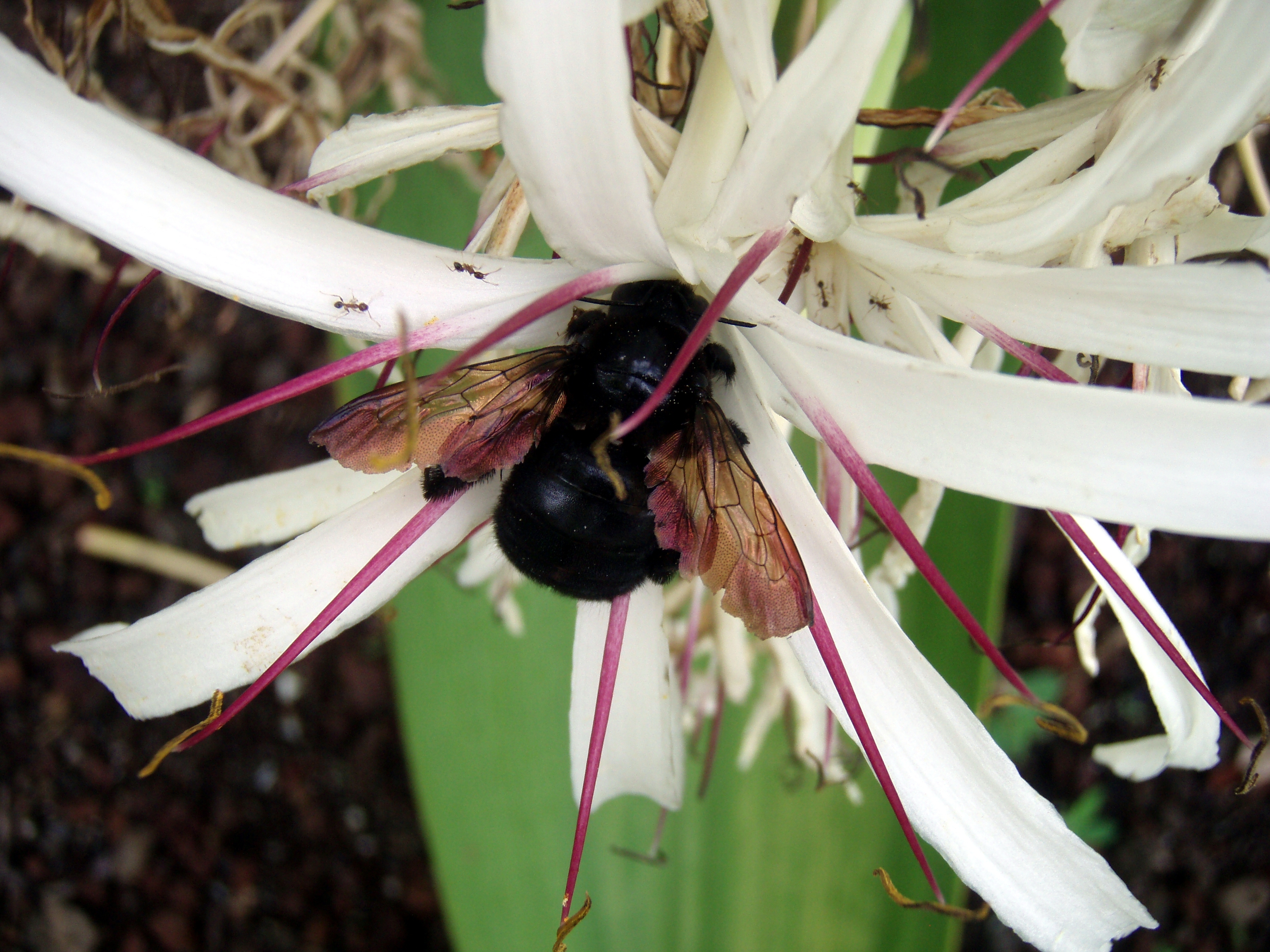
- Female Xylocopa sonorina

Conservation status
- Secure (NatureServe)

Scientific classification
- Kingdom: Animalia
- Phylum: Arthropoda
- Clade: Pancrustacea
- Class: Insecta
- Order: Hymenoptera
- Family: Apidae
- Genus: Xylocopa
- Species: X. sonorina

Binomial name
- Xylocopa sonorina Smith, 1874

Synonyms
- Xylocopa varipuncta Patton, 1879; Xylocopa aeneipennis Perkins, 1899

= Xylocopa sonorina =

Valley carpenter bee

Species of bee

Xylocopa sonorina, the valley carpenter bee or Hawaiian carpenter bee, is a species of carpenter bee found from western Texas to northern California, and the eastern Pacific islands. Females are black while males are golden-brown with green eyes.

== Taxonomy ==
X. sonorina is one of three southwestern US species in the genus Xylocopa, which has 31 subgenera and 500 species worldwide. Frederick Smith, Assistant in the Zoological Department of the British Museum and member of the council of the Entomological Society of London, first described X. sonorina in 1874 from specimens collected in Hawaii. Until 1956, it was thought that X. sonorina came from the Sunda Islands, but in a paper published that year, M. A. Lieftinck showed that Smith's interpretation of the original specimen labels was in error: Smith had mistakenly read the label of X. sonorina as meaning the Sunda Islands instead of the Sandwich Islands.

In 1899, R. C. L. Perkins described the same species as Xylocopa aeneipennis, and in 1922, P. H. Timberlake claimed that the Hawaiian Xylocopa was the same as the mainland X. varipuncta, that had been named in 1879, and Roy Snelling predicted in 2003 that X. varipuncta would eventually be reclassified as a synonym of X. sonorina. This was confirmed in 2020 using DNA analysis, and as the name sonorina has seniority, this is the valid species name.

== Description and identification ==
They are among the largest bees found in California and Hawaii, growing to around 1 inch (2.5 cm) in length. Smith's original description was:

Female.—Black; head and thorax closely and moderately punctured; the mesothorax smooth, impunctate and shining on the disk; metathorax rounded behind; abdomen shining rather finely punctured, most closely so at the sides above; the pubescence entirely black, except that on the anterior tarsi beneath, which is ferruginous; the claws of the tarsi ferruginous; wings fusco-hyaline, with a darker cloud beyond the enclosed cells, and adorned with a bright purple and coppery iridescence.

Like most native bees, females are not aggressive, and will normally sting only when provoked, while the males do not have stingers. Males possess a large thoracic gland that produce pheromones to attract females.

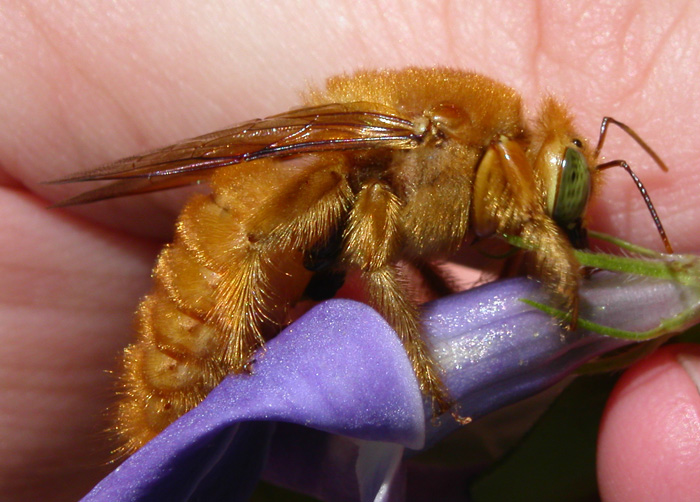
male

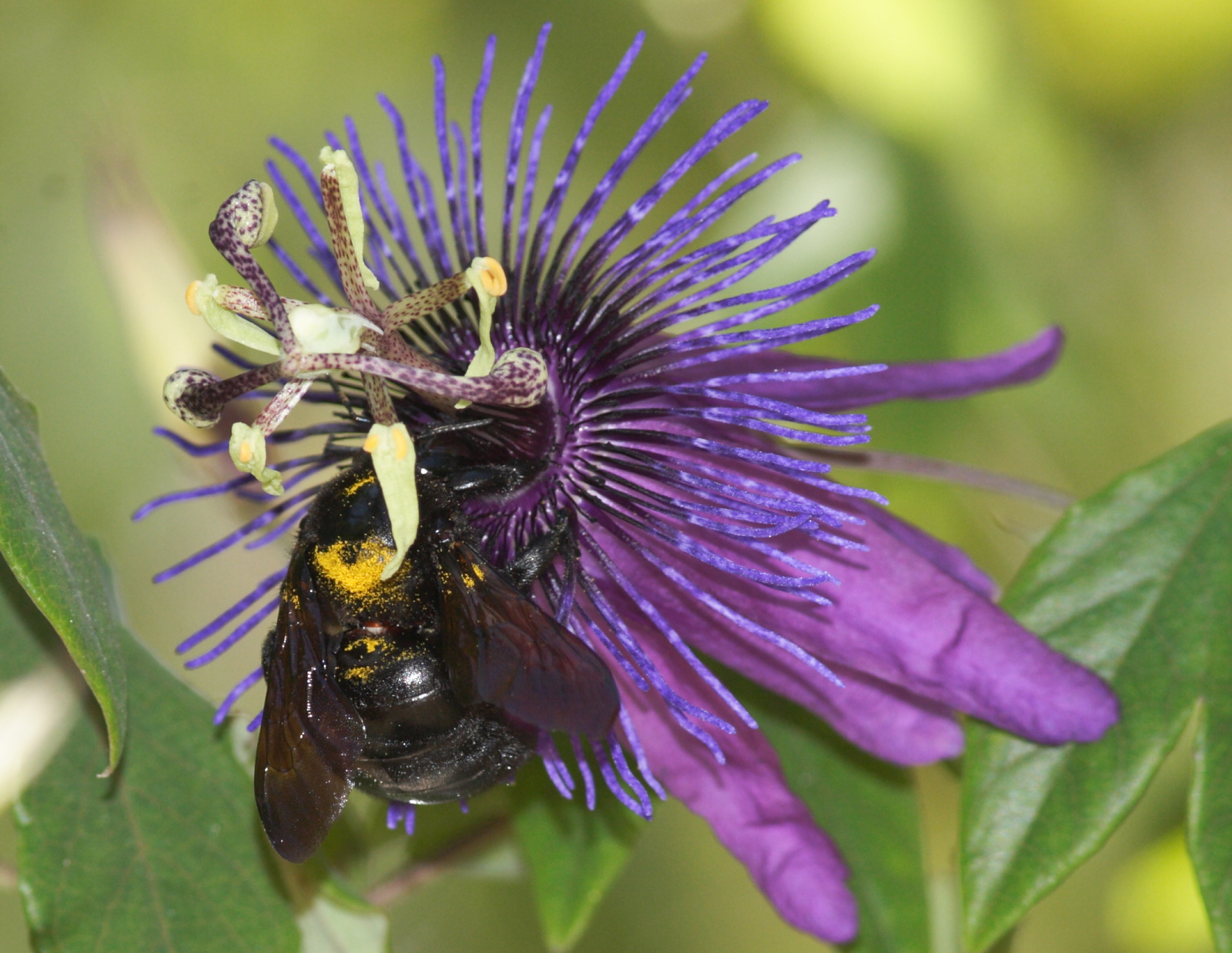
A pollen-covered female on a passionflower

female

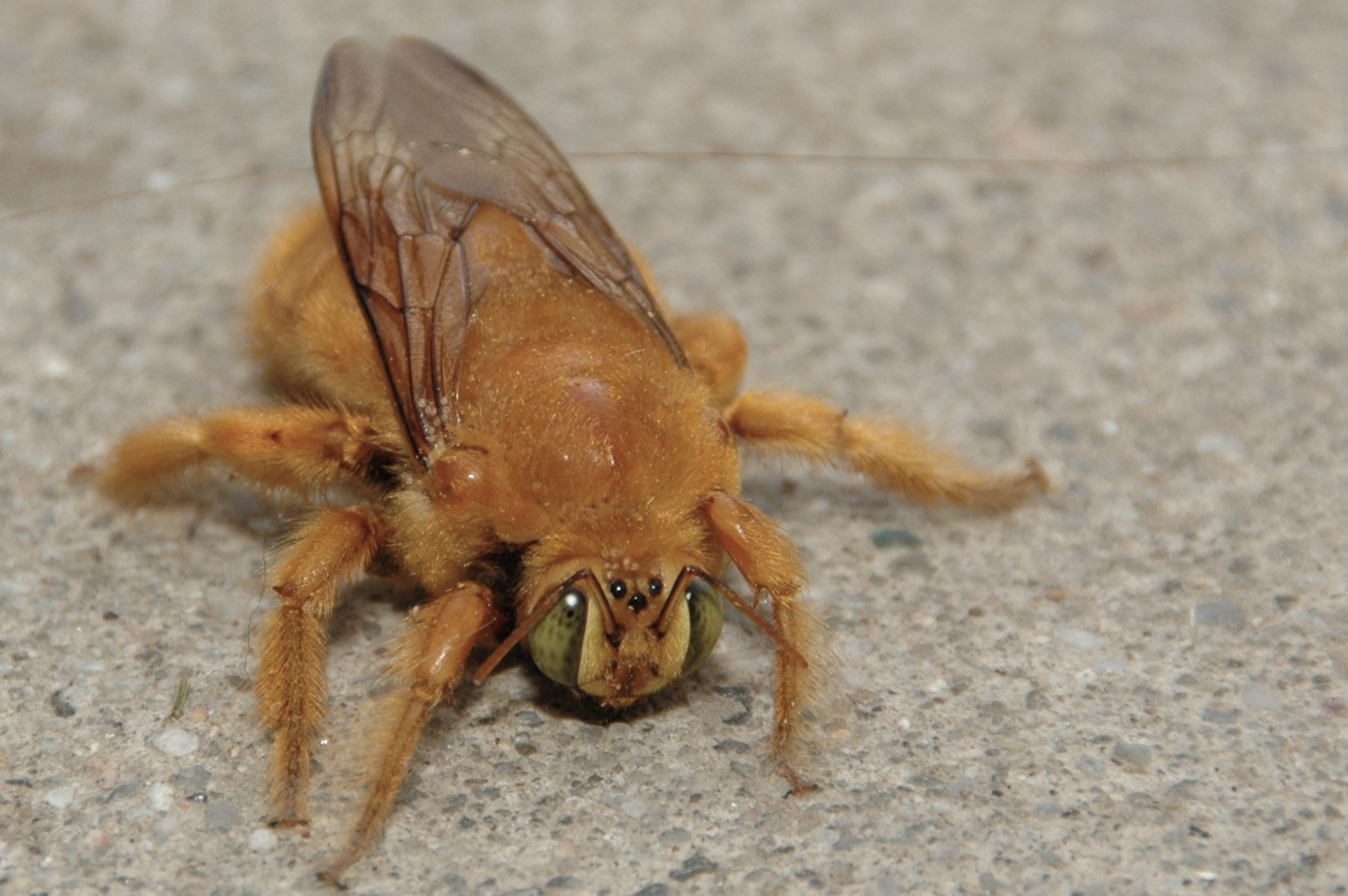
male

male specimen UCSB-IZC00012194

== Distribution and habitat ==
This species is primarily found in the southwestern part of the United States (Arizona, California, New Mexico, Nevada, Texas, and Utah) and adjacent parts of Mexico. The primary habitats of mainland X. sonorina are valleys and foothills with deciduous trees dominated by oaks. The species is also one of 11 non-native bees in the U.S. state of Hawaii. Humans are thought to have helped the species colonize Pacific archipelagoes. It is not known when X. sonorina was introduced to the Hawaiian Islands, but it occurred prior to 1874, when British entomologist Frederick Smith originally named the species, and X. sonorina is currently found on all of the main Hawaiian Islands and in the Mariana Islands. In tropical agriculture, X. sonorina has been used as a pollinator of Passiflora edulis, a species of passion fruit.

Located in the Pacific Ocean, more than 2,000 mi (3,219 km) away from the closest landfall in North America, Hawaii's great distance from the Americas is thought to have been too large for natural biological dispersal to succeed, and it has been suggested that it is likely humans aided X. sonorina in its arrival to Hawaii. Following the colonization of Hawaii, X. sonorina was introduced into the Marianas Islands, China, and Japan, but these introductions were not successful. The species has also been anecdotally reported in Midway Atoll, Java, New Guinea, and the Philippines, but only the records from Midway have any specimens recorded that serve to confirm the report.

Only two other species in the genus Xylocopa have successfully colonized Pacific archipelagoes east of the Americas through natural biological dispersal or with human help; This is out of a total of more than 150 identified species in North and South America, 70 of which can be found in Brazil alone. The two species are Xylocopa darwini, found in the Galápagos Islands, 604 mi (972 km) west of South America, with the mainland of Ecuador as the closest land mass; and Xylocopa clarionensis, found on Clarión Island in the Revillagigedo Islands, 700 mi (1,127 km) from the coast of Mexico. X. clarionensis is thought to be most closely related to Xylocopa sonorina.

== Life cycle ==
In the spring, females mate with males and then may disperse and start new nests, or clean out and enlarge the old tunnels used during the winter, adding brood cells. Each cell a female provisions contains a substance called "bee bread", which is a mixture of pollen and nectar used as food for the larvae. An egg is deposited on the pollen mass and each cell is sealed off with a partition of sawdust. Young adult male and female bees hibernate in the tunnels during the winter.

== Behavior ==
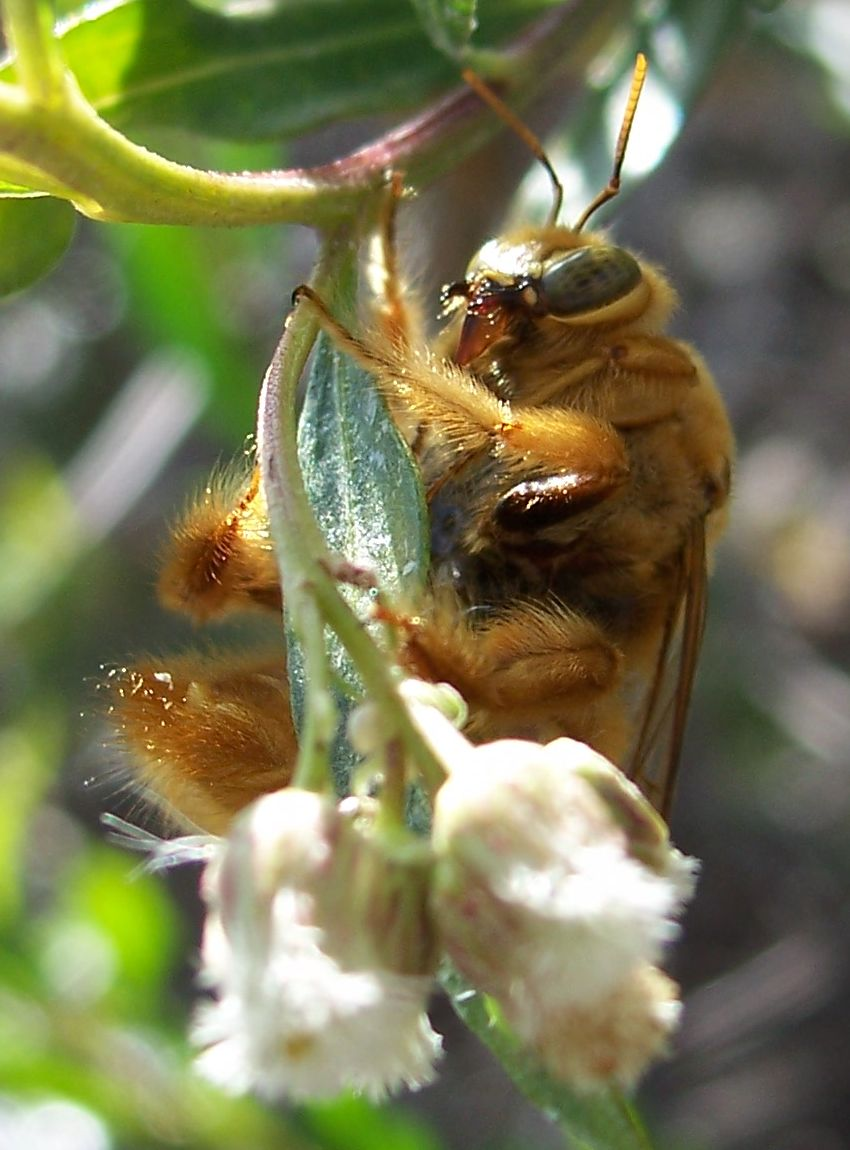
Male Xylocopa sonorina

=== Female behavior ===
Virgin females may make exploratory foraging flights and be attracted to visual and olfactory signals. Female mate-searching behavior might involve waiting for the male at the flower on which she discovers his markings or a directed flight toward a marked spot from a distance.

==== Nesting ====
All nesting cycles for all species of Xylocopa show common features. The bees have a period of reproductive dormancy even in the presence of the other sex that occurs during the dry seasons. Or, they may enter into a non-reproductive phase during the cooler months. The second characteristic of nesting cycles is that the dormant females are unmated. Additionally, mating occurs after territorial flights by the males and before nest establishment.

The name "carpenter" comes from the fact that these bees excavate nests inside a variety of woods, and the species' common name refers to the Californian Central Valley in which they are commonly found. Like its relative, Xylocopa virginica, X. sonorina like to nest in fence posts, telephone poles, and structural timbers. The bees will tunnel through wood with their mandibles, although they do not ingest the wood in the process, and they avoid painted or stained wood. The tunnels average 6 to 10 in (15 to 25 cm) in length and consist of a linear series of partitioned brood cells. The adult bees spend the winter in the tunnels. Most nests of X. sonorina contain a single female and her brood.

Because Xylocopa species are not aggressive, defense is primarily carried out by building well constructed cell partitions, blocking the nest entrance in various ways, covering the cell partitions with liquid substances, or sacrificing all the brood of a nest that has been compromised by a parasite.

Entomologist Julian R. Yates III of the University of Hawaii at Manoa describes the life cycle of X. sonorina in Hawaii:

Having located a suitable piece of wood, the female bee begins to excavate a single tunnel in preparation for egg laying. Because of our tropical climate, egg laying by female carpenter bees occurs year-round although it may decline during the winter months, when the weather is worse. Before laying eggs, the female collects pollen and deposits it, in the form of a ball, in the tunnel at a point furthest from the entrance. She lays a single egg on the pollen ball and seals both in a chamber with wood shavings. She may lay several eggs, each on its own pollen ball and inside its own sealed chamber, in a series within the tunnel. The eggs hatch in two to three days. The larvae develop in approximately two weeks. The prepupal (nonfeeding larvae) and pupal stages take about three to four weeks to reach adulthood. Teneral (adult shortly after emergence, when it is not entirely hardened or not of the mature color) females are fed by the mother. They are capable of buzzing in about a week, and of flight in approximately two to three weeks. A single female in a tunnel may be joined later by her offspring or other bees. Only one female will collect pollen, prepare cells, and lay eggs, however. Other females perform guard and nest-cleaning duties.

==== Pollination ====
Flowers are the sole source of food and water for these bees, which have a pattern of visiting certain plants at various times throughout the day, and provide pollen for the females to feed their brood. To collect pollen from most flowers, females gather pollen on their hindlegs through contact with the exposed anthers, but in flowers such as Solanaceae with closed anthers, they can use buzz pollination, by which the pollen is released from anther following vibration of the indirect flight muscles of the bee.

The foraging behavior of X. sonorina involves a quick series of movements between flowers. In a 1996 study using Asystasia gangetica (Chinese violet), X. sonorina visited 16 flowers per minute and spent an average of 1.5 seconds at each flower, usually flying towards the flower from the front, landing on the petals, and moving to the bottom of the corolla. Another study found that X. sonorina was a primary and secondary nectar "robber" of A. gangetica since it "took nectar through perforations and did not contact stigmas in doing so." Floral robbery occurs when the carpenter bee makes perforations near the base of the tubular corolla of the flower to obtain nectar, but does not pollinate the flower in return, when visiting flowers that are so deep they cannot reach the nectar with their tongues.

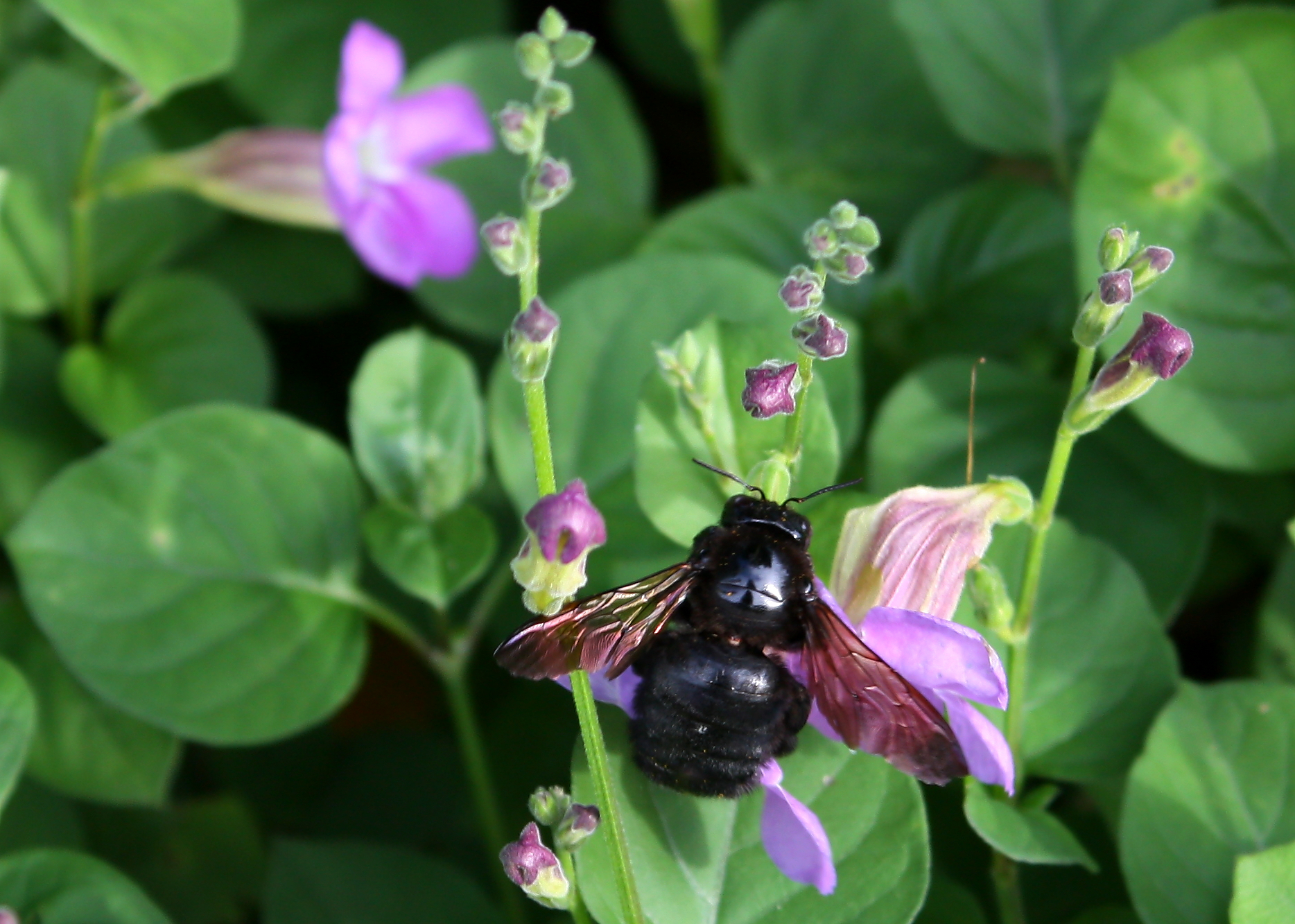
X. sonorina in a field of Chinese violet (Asystasia gangetica)

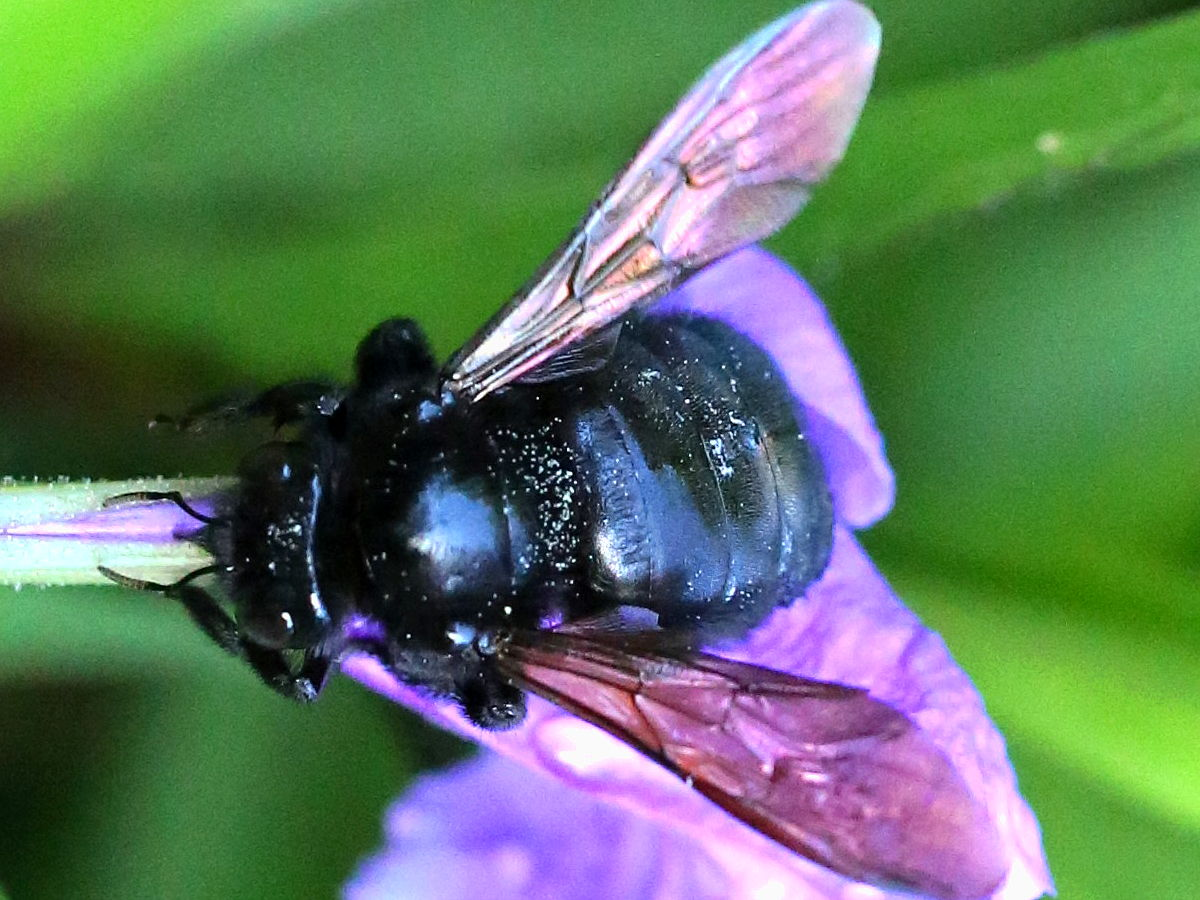
Robbing nectar in Hawaii

Some flowers protect themselves from robbery with adaptive structures such as strong plant walls or by producing extrafloral nectar which is visited by ants that inhibit the bees from robbing the nectar, though ant guards are only effective against certain bee species (not Xylocopa).

In Hawaii and Niue Island, X. sonorina has been used in tropical agriculture as a pollinator of Passiflora edulis, a species of passion fruit. Although valued for their pollination, carpenter bee nesting behavior often results in their classification as pests; The bees prefer to burrow into wood to create nest galleries. Due to this problem, in 1934, a blister beetle (Cissites auriculata) was brought to Hawaii in an attempt to decrease the number of X. sonorina; there is no evidence that C. auriculata became established.

=== Male behavior ===
Male valley carpenter bee on Coreopsis

Males of X. sonorina appear to optimize their mate-locating activity, following the predictions of the ideal free distribution theory. This theory states that the most fit individuals will seek to occupy the most resource rich territory and those that are less fit will have to occupy a resource lacking territory until both territories are filled. For species such as X. sonorina, there are patches of different quality arising from "the continuous but variable input of mate-searching females over afternoons and flight seasons". Males may rely on environmental cues rather than on food availability when choosing their territories.

==== Attractive pheromone ====
The large mesosomal gland of male X. sonorina produces volatile components, called pheromones, which are attractive to females. These pheromones are long-range attractants and are used as male advertisements. The gland is seasonally active and overwintering males have no detectable attractant. X. sonorina mark the central area of their territories with the pheromones. Three observations were made that helped form this conclusion:

1. Flying bees occasionally brush against leaves or twigs towards the center
2. The "land and walk" behavior occurs at the focal area involving the application of the pheromone chemical
3. Females fly to and pause on non-flowering plants that had been the focal area of the male where the attractant was placed.

==== Territoriality and site fidelity ====
Non-resource-based territoriality evolved from food source territoriality as a response to a low density of bees. The probability of a single male encountering females is very low, and the production of attractants by the male would be advantageous to both sexes. The attractants may be signals such as loud buzzing by the male and the addition of an odor to the flowers. The males may use these signals when patrolling along extended paths or hovering at a specific site. "At this point real male dominance polygyny begins, for males may produce quantitatively or qualitatively individual pheromonal signals that may reflect their fitness, and the female could react correspondingly by selecting among the males". The use of pheromonal signals allows males to relocate their territories from resource sites to prominent sites such as hilltops, various protrusions, or trees. At this point, pheromones may direct the female into the territory founded by males. Short-range marking of the signal by the female bee attracts them to male territory just before copulation will occur. Competition among males for non resource sites may lead to adaptations that continue to evolve until one male has an advantage over the other.

There are various factors that affect X. sonorina fidelity rates. First, high mortality rates of resident males is significantly correlated with frequent turnover rates and decreased site fidelity. Second, male density affects site fidelity. As the ratio of rivals to suitable territories rises, competition for territorial control increases, which leads to frequent turnover. In contrast, if there are few replacements for territory owners, there will be evidence of increasing site fidelity. For X. sonorina, the prevalence of days of very low territorial occupation and a few days of high male density in "lek" conditions resulted in decreasing fidelity. Another aspect of the environment that affects site fidelity is the quality of territorial sites. Finally, fluctuating or declining territory value should reduce the extent of site fidelity. The extent to which female territorial preferences remain constant throughout the mating season will be very important in territory value. Males are expected to abandon territories at times when they no longer have the potential to produce offspring. It is also conceivable that in X. sonorina, the quality of the male's sex pheromone may be a key feature determining his sexual attractiveness. Most males of X. sonorina did not exhibit site fidelity, while few males exhibited strong attachment to their original sites.

=== Thermoregulation ===
An unusual characteristic of X. sonorina is their ability to thermoregulate at temperatures beyond the range of other bee species that have been tested; they can fly at very high temperatures without overheating and at low temperatures without freezing. By modifying their foraging patterns and flying between different altitudes depending upon temperature, the valley carpenter bee is able to adapt to very different environments. Xylocopa sonorina maintain thoracic temperatures of 33.0 to 46.5 °C while traveling through environments with 12.0 to 40.0 °C. Since the thoracic temperature is not constant the bees are thermoregulating. There is physiological transfer of large amounts of heat to the abdomen and to the head during pre-flight warming and thoracic heating. The temperature increase of the head is due to passive conduction, while the abdomen is due to physiological heat transfer throughout the body. Xylocopa have circulatory anatomy like honeybees and bumblebees. Like bumblebees, they have an aortic loop through the flight muscles that acts as a cooling coil allowing heat transfer to the blood, head, and abdomen.

Carpenter bees have large heads, which present a larger surface area for convective cooling. The abdomen is also "well-suited for rapid convective heat loss because it is flattened dorso-ventral, and uninsulated". Physiological heat transfer to head or abdomen would not be apparent from body temperatures due to the rapid convective cooling, especially at high air temperatures when flight speed increases; thermoregulation involves a strong reliance on forced convection as a result of changes in flight speed, with active heat transfer from the abdomen and conductive heat loss from the head the faster they fly.
