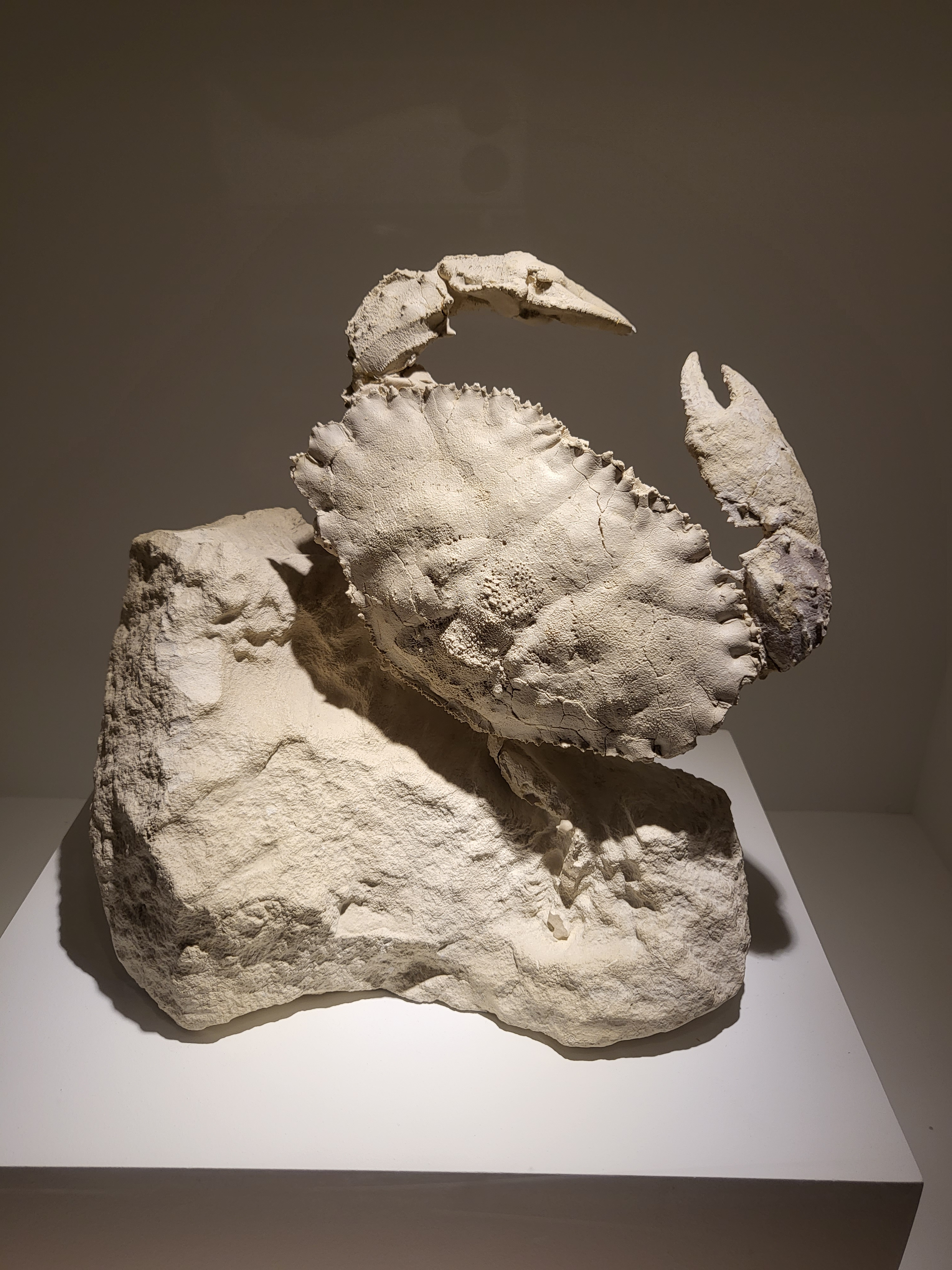
- Lobocarcinus sismondai at the Houston Museum of Natural Science

Scientific classification
- Kingdom: Animalia
- Phylum: Arthropoda
- Clade: Pancrustacea
- Class: Malacostraca
- Order: Decapoda
- Suborder: Pleocyemata
- Infraorder: Brachyura
- Family: Cancridae
- Genus: †Lobocarcinus
- Species: †L. sismondai

Binomial name
- †Lobocarcinus sismondai (von Meyer, 1859)

Synonyms
- Cancer sismondai von Meyer, 1859; Cancer deshayesii A. Milne-Edwards, 1861

= Lobocarcinus sismondai =

Lobocarcinus sismondai Temporal range: Pliocene

Extinct species of crab

Lobocarcinus sismondai is an extinct species of marine crab in the family Cancridae.

Part of a Pliocene-aged carapace was recovered, and is housed in the Yorkshire Museum. Another fossil specimen was recorded by Lipke Holthuis in 1949, based on fixed fingers and an isolated dactylus. That specimen was recovered from Miocene–Lower Pleistocene deposits in the Netherlands.
