= Peripatus dominicae =

Scientific classification
- Kingdom: Animalia
- Phylum: Onychophora
- Family: Peripatidae
- Genus: Peripatus
- Species: P. dominicae

Binomial name
- Peripatus dominicae Pollard, 1894

Synonyms
- Peripatus dominicae Pollard, 1894; Peripatus dominicae dominicae Peck 1975

Species of velvet worm

Peripatus dominicae is a species of velvet worm in the Peripatidae family. The type locality for this species is on the Caribbean island of Dominica. Although the Canadian zoologist Stewart Peck introduced the name Peripatus dominicae dominicae in 1975 to distinguish the original species from other subspecies then assigned to P. dominicae, authorities now deem these subspecies to be separate species in light of the significant distances between their type localities (ranging from 115 km to 1,380 km).

== Description ==
The original description of this species is based on a large sample of 86 specimens collected in Dominica and then preserved before the British zoologist Ray Lankester passed them on to E.C. Pollard for description. After Pollard's original description, the French zoologist Eugène Louis Bouvier examined and described another 15 females and two males of this species. More recently, the biologist V.M.S.J. Read examined and described seven specimens deposited in the Natural History Museum of London, including two with specific locality records (Prince Rupert and Laudat), using electron scanning microscopy.

Females are apparently more common than males: Pollard determined the sex of 39 of her specimens, of which 31 were female and only eight were male. This species exhibits a notable degree of sexual dimorphism in the size of fully grown adults: Females in this species range in size from 29 mm to 56 mm in length, while males range from 17 mm to 25 mm in length. This species also exhibits sexual dimorphism in the number of legs: All specimens identified as males of this species have 25 pairs of legs, whereas females can have 28 to 31 pairs of legs and usually have 29.

The sole of each foot features four pads, except for the last pair of legs, which feature only two pads on each foot. The distal end of each foot features three papillae, two on the anterior margin and one on the posterior margin. The nephridial tubercles on the fourth and fifth leg pairs are attached to the third pad on each foot. The two pregenital leg pairs in the male of this species feature crural papillae, with two papillae on each leg.

Preserved specimens are usually reddish brown with a diffuse darker streak down the middle of the back and a much paler light grey or greyish yellow ventral surface. The dorsal and ventral sides of the legs match the colors of the dorsal and ventral surfaces of the body. The antennae are a dark red-brown, but with the distal end much more pale. The basal piece of the primary papillae has a convex conical shape with ten to twelve scale ranks. The apical piece of the primary papillae is large and spherical with about five scale ranks.
