= Guilding =

Guilding may refer to:

- Reverend Lansdown Guilding (1797-1831), malacologist from St. Vincent
- Gilding, the technique of applying a thin layer of gold to a surface.
