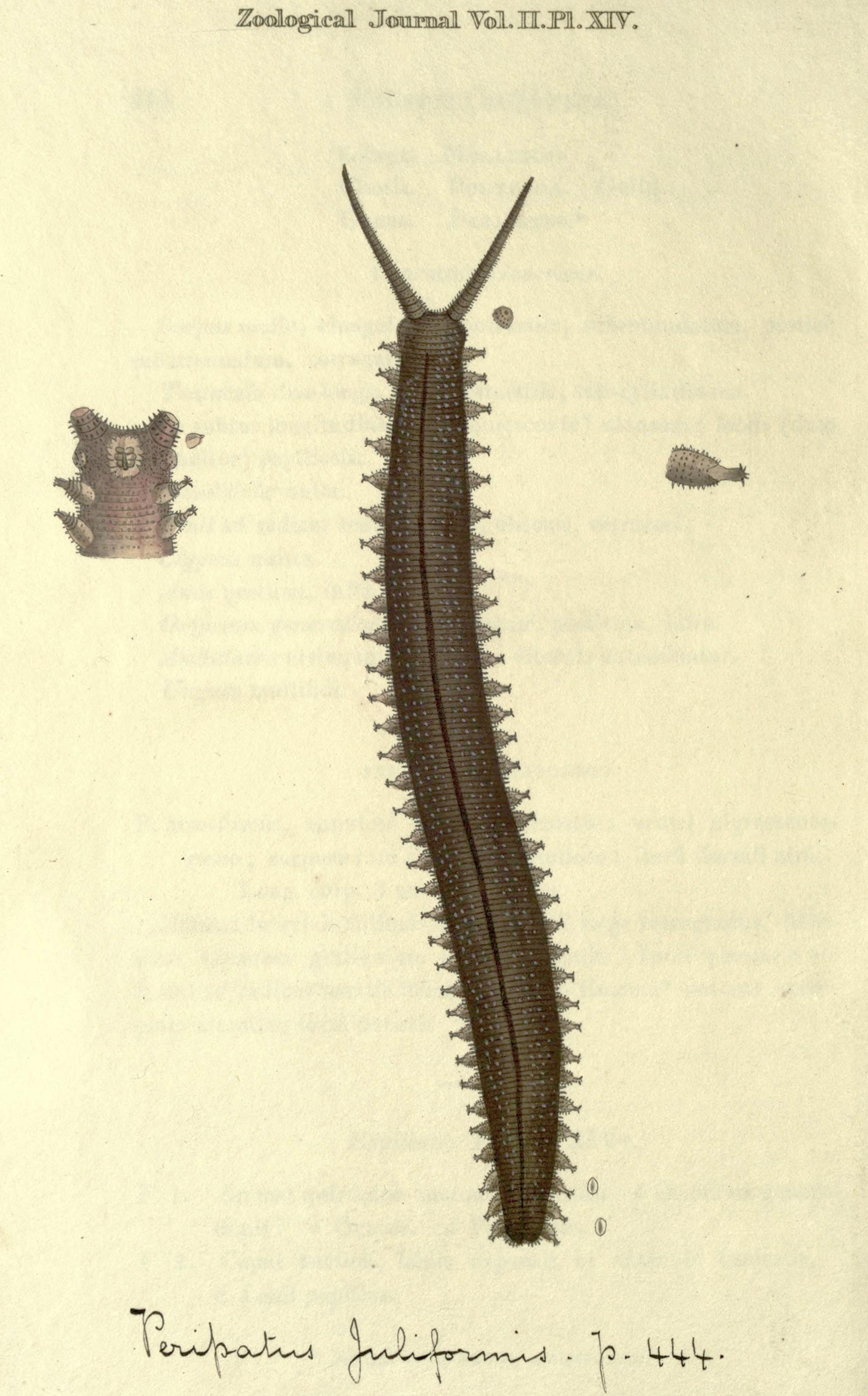
- Original illustration from Guilding, L. (1826) Mollusca Caribbaeana. Zoological Journal 2: plate XIV.

Scientific classification
- Kingdom: Animalia
- Phylum: Onychophora
- Family: Peripatidae
- Genus: Peripatus
- Species: P. juliformis

Binomial name
- Peripatus juliformis Guilding, 1826

= Peripatus juliformis =

Species of velvet worm

Peripatus juliformis is a species of velvet worm in the Peripatidae family. The number of legs in this species ranges from 29 pairs to 34 pairs. Specimens are a very dark brown, almost black, with a paler ventral surface. Females range from 36 mm to 75 mm in length, whereas males range from 14 mm to 16 mm. The type locality is on Saint Vincent Island.

This species became the first velvet worm known to science when Guilding described it in 1826. He thought it was an unusual type of slug, and included it along with his Caribbean mollusks. He named this genus Peripatus (1826). He included an excellent watercolor painting of the specimen, and a mention of the defensive mechanism of sticky liquid squirts. A translation into English from Guilding's description, originally written in Latin, shows how he first classified the specimen in the Class Moluska, and how astonished he was for discovering a new species.
