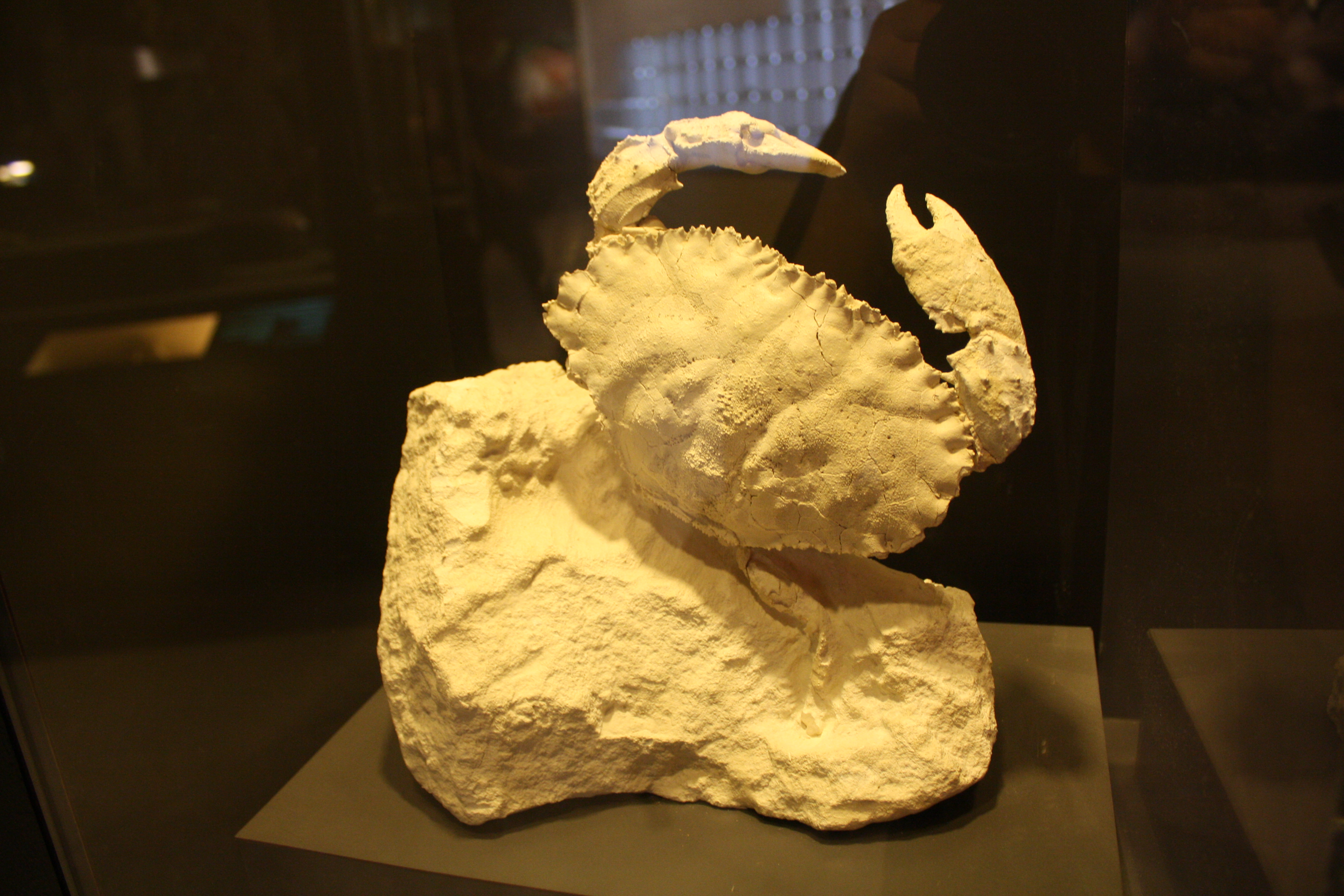
- Lobocarcinus sismondai

Scientific classification
- Kingdom: Animalia
- Phylum: Arthropoda
- Class: Malacostraca
- Order: Decapoda
- Suborder: Pleocyemata
- Infraorder: Brachyura
- Family: Cancridae
- Genus: †Lobocarcinus; Reuss, 1857

= Lobocarcinus =

Lobocarcinus Temporal range: Eocene–Pliocene

Extinct genus of crabs

Lobocarcinus is a genus of extinct marine crabs that lived in the Eocene through Pliocene, containing these species:

- Lobocarcinus sismondai
- Lobocarcinus lumacopius
- Lobocarcinus pustulosus
- Lobocarcinus paulinowurtemberbensis
- Lobocarcinus indicus
- Lobocarcinus aegypticus
