= Peripatus heloisae =

Scientific classification
- Kingdom: Animalia
- Phylum: Onychophora
- Family: Peripatidae
- Genus: Peripatus
- Species: P. heloisae

Binomial name
- Peripatus heloisae Carvalho, 1941

Species of velvet worm

Peripatus heloisae is a species of velvet worm in the Peripatidae family. Females of this species have 31 to 34 pairs of legs; males have 28 to 32. The type locality is in Mato Grosso, Brazil.
