= Peripatus lachauxensis =

Scientific classification
- Kingdom: Animalia
- Phylum: Onychophora
- Family: Peripatidae
- Genus: Peripatus
- Species: P. lachauxensis

Binomial name
- Peripatus lachauxensis Brues, 1935

Synonyms
- Peripatus dominicae var. lachauxensis Brues, 1935

Species of velvet worm

Peripatus lachauxensis is a species of velvet worm in the Peripatidae family. The female of this species has 30 to 33 pairs of legs. The type locality is in Haiti.
