= Peripatus manni =

Scientific classification
- Kingdom: Animalia
- Phylum: Onychophora
- Family: Peripatidae
- Genus: Peripatus
- Species: P. manni

Binomial name
- Peripatus manni Brues, 1913

Species of velvet worm

Peripatus manni is a species of velvet worm in the Peripatidae family. The male of this species has 29 pairs of legs; females have 30 or 31. The type locality is in Haiti.
