= Peripatus danicus =

Scientific classification
- Kingdom: Animalia
- Phylum: Onychophora
- Family: Peripatidae
- Genus: Peripatus
- Species: P. danicus

Binomial name
- Peripatus danicus Bouvier, 1900

Synonyms
- Peripatus juliformis danicus Bouvier, 1900

Species of velvet worm

Peripatus danicus is a species of velvet worm in the Peripatidae family. Females of this species have 31 to 33 pairs of legs; males have 26 to 28. Females range from 26 mm to 45 mm in length, whereas males range from 9 mm to 21 mm. The type locality is in Saint Thomas Island.
