= French aviso Talisman =

French navy oceanographic vessel

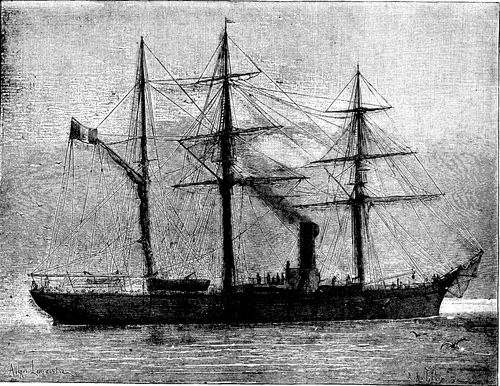
Le Talisman

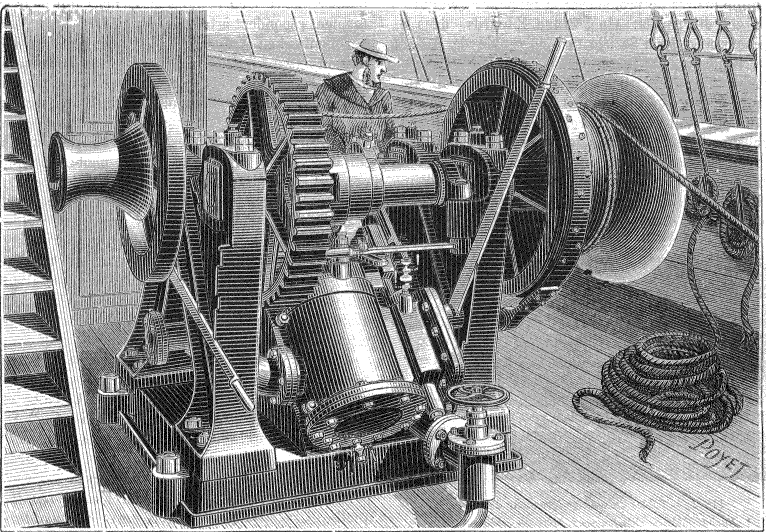
Winch for lowering and raising the dredge aboard Le Talisman

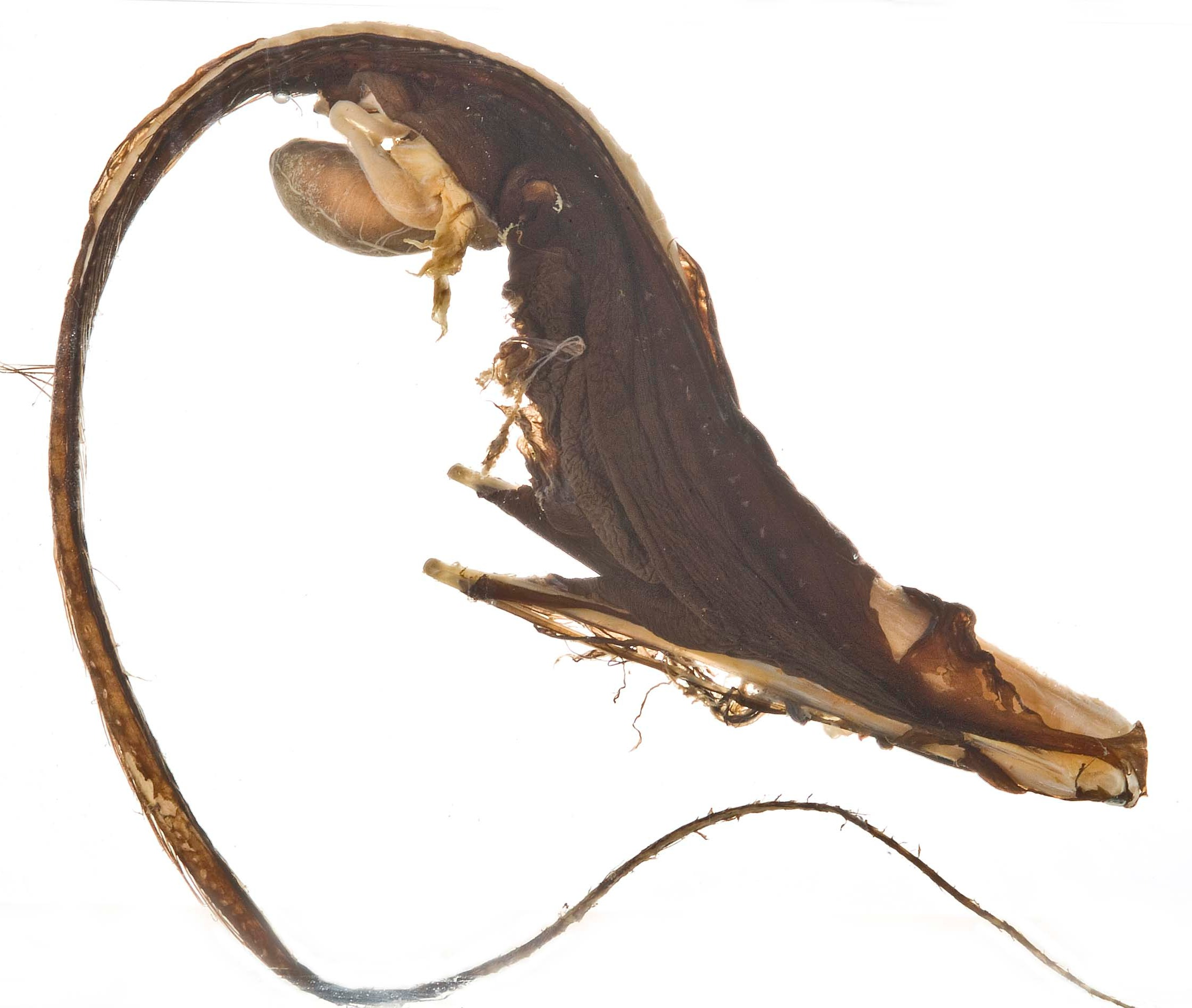
Eurypharynx pelecanoides

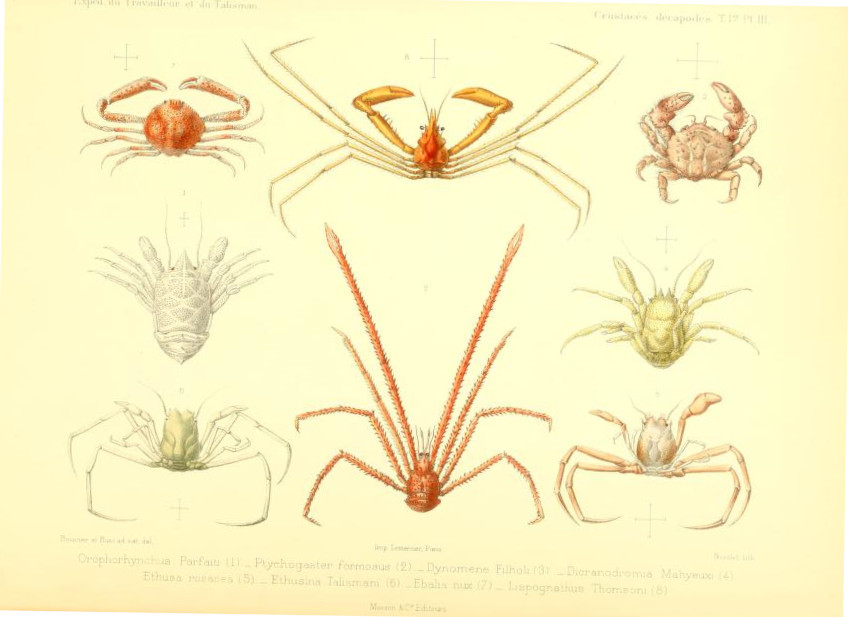
Plate III

Le Talisman was a French Navy sloop built at Le Havre in 1862 which was used for geological, biological and hydrological exploration in the Atlantic Ocean and Mediterranean Sea at the end of the 19th century. It first served as a communications vessel ("aviso"), and was both sail and propeller driven.

In 1883 it was fitted out for scientific work under the direction of Professor Alphonse Milne-Edwards, equipped with a dredging winch with a capacity of 20 tons, and fitted to carry seven scientists together with a laboratory.

From June to August 1883, the Talisman carried out a research cruise in the Bay of Biscay, on the coasts of Morocco, Senegal, the Canary Islands, Cape Verde and the Azores and in the Sargasso Sea, collecting considerable material via dredging, at depths of up to 5,000 m (16,000 ft). Among the expedition scientists were:

- Alphonse Milne-Edwards
- Henri Filhol
- Léopold de Folin
- Léon Vaillant
- Louis-Alexandre Vincent

This cruise yielded finds from the deep sea and sea bottom such as the pelican eel, and the decapod, Ethusina talismani. One most important find was the discovery of the viability of micro-organisms at depths of 5 km below the surface (and consequently living at enormous pressures).

Brachiopods collected during the expeditions of 1880, 1881, 1882, 1883 on the Travailleur and the Talisman are held in the Fischer-Œhlert collection and at the Laval Science Museum.

== Publications from the expeditions ==
include:

- Filhol, H. (1884). "Exploration sous-marine Voyage du "Talisman"". La Nature (in French). 12 (part 1). Paris: 119–122, 134–138, 147–151, 161–164, 182–186, 198–202, 230–234, 278–282, 326–330, 391–394.
  - pp.134-138, pp.147-151, pp.161-164, pp. 182-186, pp. 198-202,
- Filhol, H. (1885). La vie au fond des mers: les explorations sous-marines et les voyages du Travailleur et du Talisman: Crustacés. p. 118.
- Milne-Edwards, A.; Bouvier, E.-L. (1898). "Crustacés nouveaux provenant des campagnes du Travailleur et du Talisman". Bulletin du Muséum National d'Histoire Naturelle. 4. Paris: 32–35, 75–77, 152–154, 183–190, 234–238.
- Rémy Perrier (1899). "Diagnoses des Holothuries draguées par le Travailleur et le Talisman". 5: 244.
- Bouvier, E.L. (1915). "Thalassinidés nouveaux capturés au large des côtes soudanaises par "Le Talisman"". Bulletin du Muséum National d'Histoire Naturelle (in French). 21: 182 – via BHL.
- Certes, A. (1884). "Sur la culture, à l'abri des germes atmosphériques, des eaux et des sédiments rapportés par les expéditions du Travailleur et du Talisman". Comptes Rendus Hebdomadaires des Séances de l'Académie des Sciences (in French). 98: 690–693.
