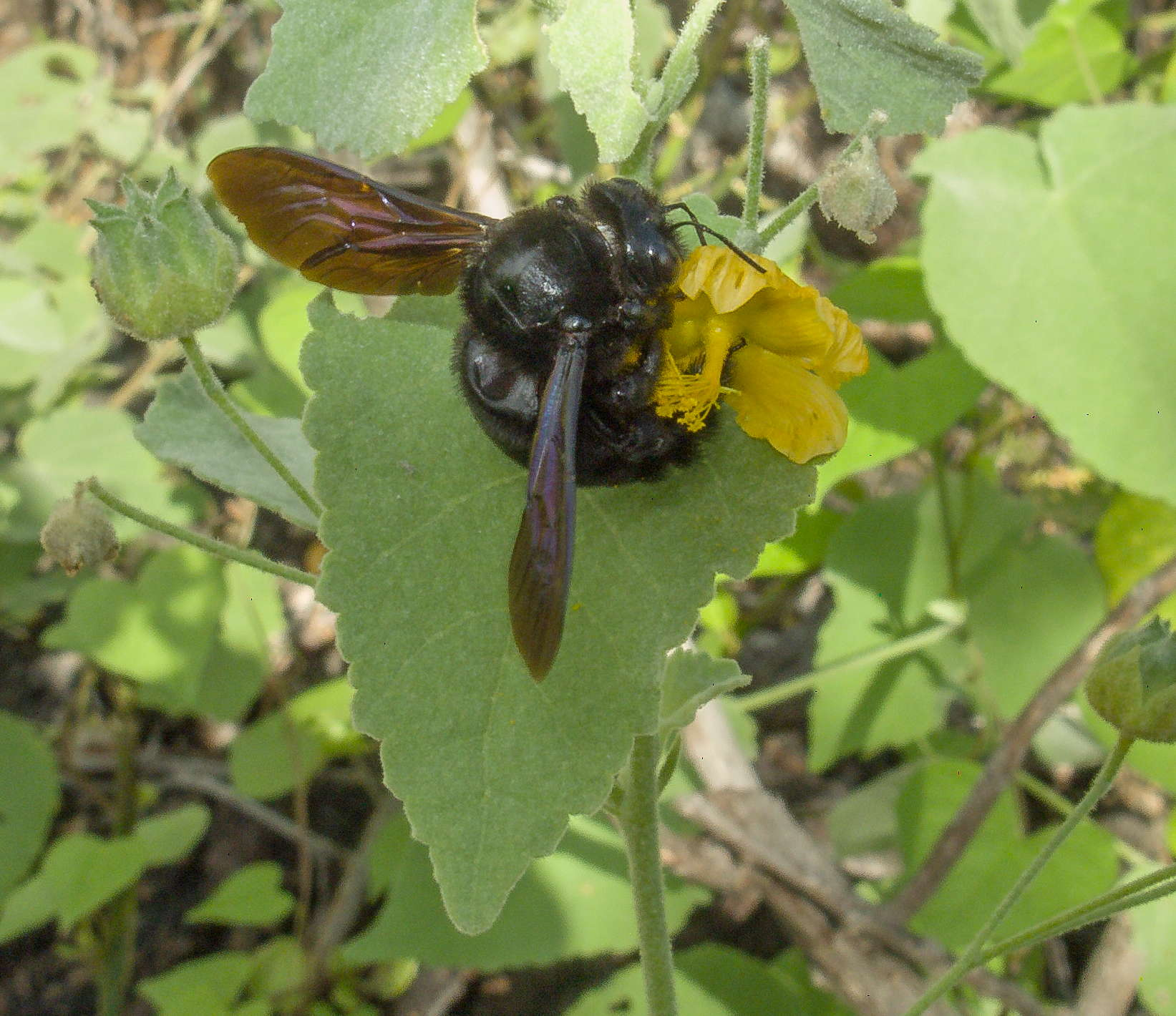
- Female, on Bastardia viscosa (viscid mallow), Santa Cruz Island

Scientific classification
- Kingdom: Animalia
- Phylum: Arthropoda
- Class: Insecta
- Order: Hymenoptera
- Family: Apidae
- Genus: Xylocopa
- Species: X. darwini

Binomial name
- Xylocopa darwini Cockerell, 1926

= Xylocopa darwini =

Galápagos carpenter bee

Species of bee

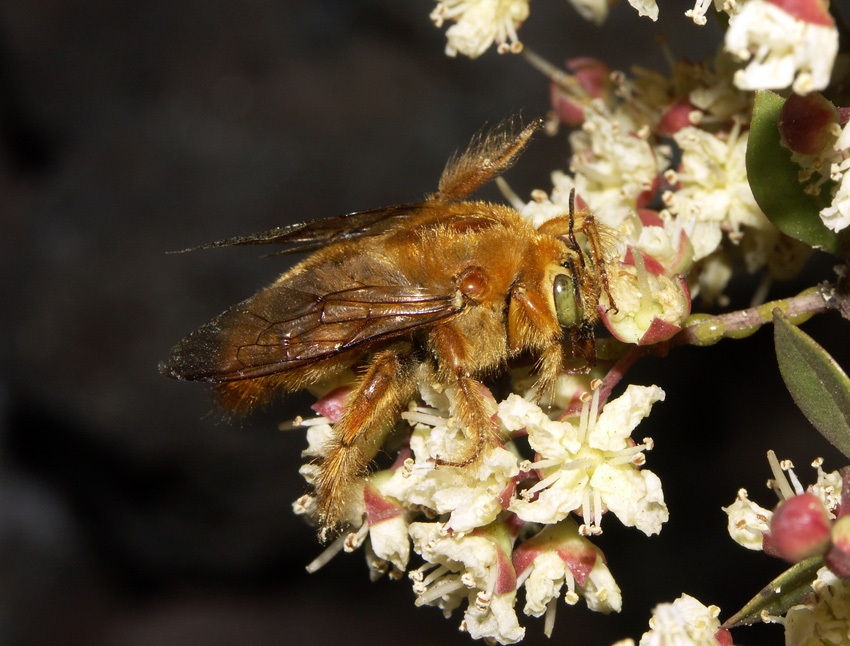
Male, Isabela island

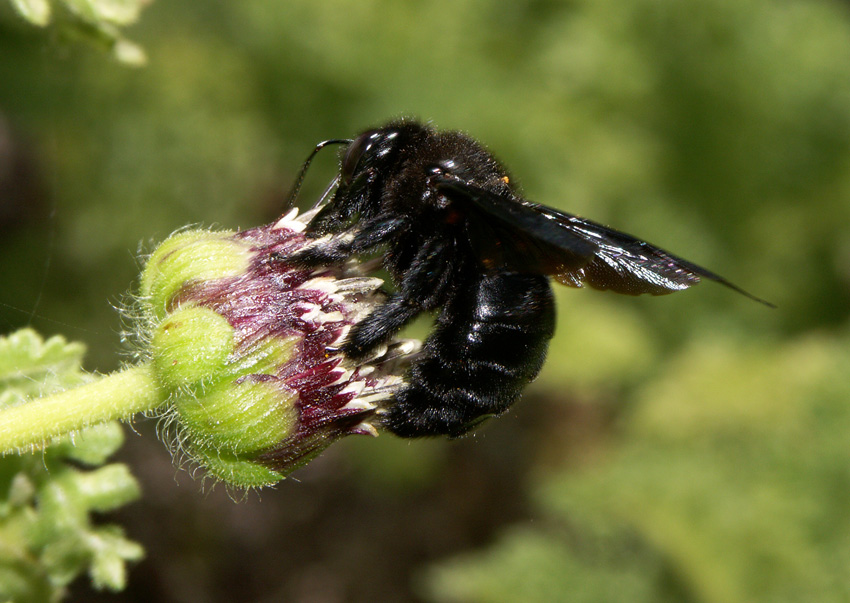
Female, Santa Cruz island

Xylocopa darwini, the Galápagos carpenter bee, is the only native species of bee in the Galápagos Islands, to which it is endemic. Altogether, only three species of bee are found in the islands. This species is found on 75% of the largest islands. It is sexually dimorphic and is known for its complex behavior. As the only native bee, Xylocopa darwini serves as an important primary pollinator within the plant-pollinator network of the archipelago.

== Description ==
The leaf-cutter bee and the wool carder bee are introduced, making the Galápagos carpenter bee the only native species. As a sexually dimorphic species, the male and female bees look different. The female bee is dark and shiny with black setae, and is commonly found throughout the year. The male is rarer, with a black abdomen and yellow-brown setae. A rare specimen in the Smithsonian collection exhibits gynandromorphism, with a visually female left side and a visually male right side.

== Distribution ==
Galapagos carpenter bees can be found on 9 out of the 12 largest islands, but not all of the islands in the archipelago. These include Isabela, San Cristóbal, Santa Cruz, Santiago, Fernandina, Floreana, Genovesa, Santa Fe, and Española.

== Behavior ==
This insect gets its common name 'carpenter bee' from the way that females form nests. They bore holes into the branches and trunks of trees and lay their eggs within the solitary cavities. They prefer to bore holes into soft dead wood, such as the wood of sea hibiscus, Croton, palo santo and coral trees. Male Galápagos carpenter bees have been recorded exhibiting territorial behavior, and may defend plants from intruders. They patrol the claimed shrub or tree and chase away trespassing animals, but allow female bees to enter the defended area.

== Ecological role ==
These insects serve as an important keystone species since they are the predominant pollinators of native and introduced plants on the islands. They are the most generalized pollinators in the Galápagos ecosystem, meaning that they consume nectar and pollen from the widest array of different flowers, adding up to at least 84 flowering species. They compete for food with other pollinators including birds, lizards, and other insects. Their niche as pollinators is vital to the stability of plant populations, even though most well documented plant species on the archipelago are capable of self-pollination. Galapagos carpenter bee populations could be negatively impacted by invasive species through competition and predation. Introduced birds such as the smooth-billed ani have been documented preying on the bees, which could significantly affect the unique ecosystem of the archipelago.

These bees are parasitized by the blister beetle Cissites maculata, and the two species have a phoretic relationship. The presence of both the bees and parasitoid beetles on the islands suggests that they were transported together and colonized the archipelago concurrently.
