= Peripatus haitiensis =

Scientific classification
- Kingdom: Animalia
- Phylum: Onychophora
- Family: Peripatidae
- Genus: Peripatus
- Species: P. haitiensis

Binomial name
- Peripatus haitiensis Brues, 1913

Species of velvet worm

Peripatus haitiensis is a species of velvet worm in the Peripatidae family. The female of this species has 30 to 32 pairs of legs. The type locality is in Haiti.
