= Peripatus sedgwicki =

Scientific classification
- Kingdom: Animalia
- Phylum: Onychophora
- Family: Peripatidae
- Genus: Peripatus
- Species: P. sedgwicki

Binomial name
- Peripatus sedgwicki Bouvier, 1899

Species of velvet worm

Peripatus sedgwicki is a species of velvet worm in the Peripatidae family. Females of this species have 29 to 32 pairs of legs; males have 28 to 30. Females range from 25 mm to 60 mm in length, while males range from 23 mm to 30 mm. The type locality is in Venezuela.
