= Peripatus brolemanni =

Scientific classification
- Kingdom: Animalia
- Phylum: Onychophora
- Family: Peripatidae
- Genus: Peripatus
- Species: P. brolemanni

Binomial name
- Peripatus brolemanni Bouvier, 1899

Species of velvet worm

Peripatus brolemanni is a species of velvet worm in the Peripatidae family. Females of this species have 30 to 33 pairs of legs; males have 29. Females range from 39 mm to 65 mm in length, whereas males range from 27 mm to 28 mm. The type locality is in Venezuela.
