= Peripatus darlingtoni =

Scientific classification
- Kingdom: Animalia
- Phylum: Onychophora
- Family: Peripatidae
- Genus: Peripatus
- Species: P. darlingtoni

Binomial name
- Peripatus darlingtoni Brues, 1935

Synonyms
- Peripatus dominicae var. darlingtoni Brues, 1935

Species of velvet worm

Peripatus darlingtoni is a species of velvet worm in the Peripatidae family. The female of this species has 33 or 34 pairs of legs. The type locality is in Haiti.
