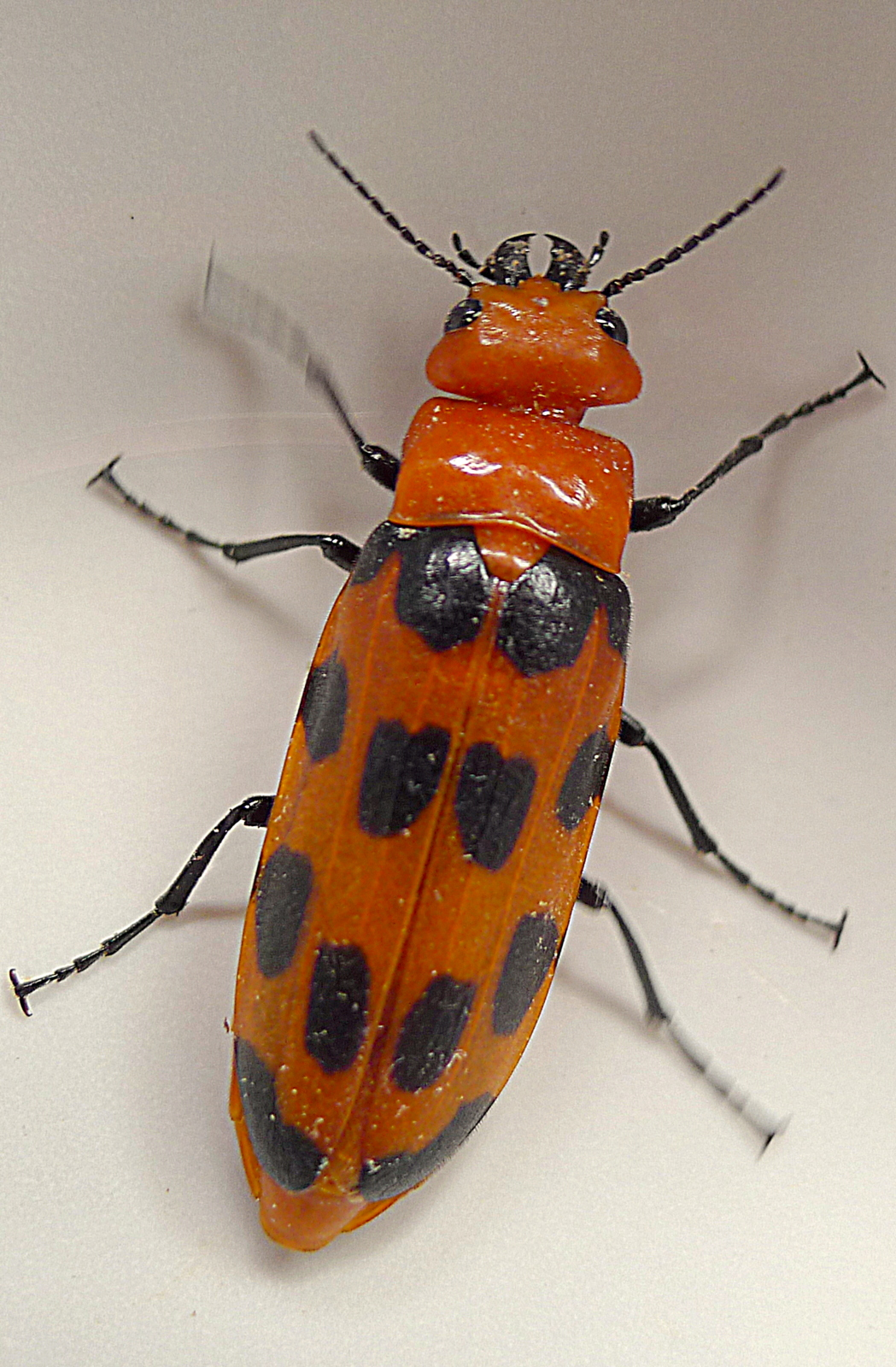

Scientific classification
- Kingdom: Animalia
- Phylum: Arthropoda
- Clade: Pancrustacea
- Class: Insecta
- Order: Coleoptera
- Suborder: Polyphaga
- Infraorder: Cucujiformia
- Family: Meloidae
- Genus: Cissites
- Species: C. maculata

Binomial name
- Cissites maculata (Swederus, 1787)

= Cissites maculata =

Species of beetle

Cissites maculata is a species of blister beetle that lives in the Neotropical realm.

== Ecology ==
On the Galápagos Islands, they are a brood parasite of Xylocopa darwini, the Galápagos carpenter bee.
