= Peripatus swainsonae =

Scientific classification
- Kingdom: Animalia
- Phylum: Onychophora
- Family: Peripatidae
- Genus: Peripatus
- Species: P. swainsonae

Binomial name
- Peripatus swainsonae Cockerell, 1893

Synonyms
- Peripatus jamaicensis mut. swainsonae Cockerell 1893; Peripatus juliformis var. gossei Bouvier, 1900; Peripatus juliformis gossei Cockerell, 1901; Peripatus juliformis var. swainsonae Cockerell, 1901

Species of velvet worm

Peripatus swainsonae is a species of velvet worm in the Peripatidae family. Females of this species have 31 to 34 pairs of legs; males have 28 to 30. The type locality is in Jamaica.
