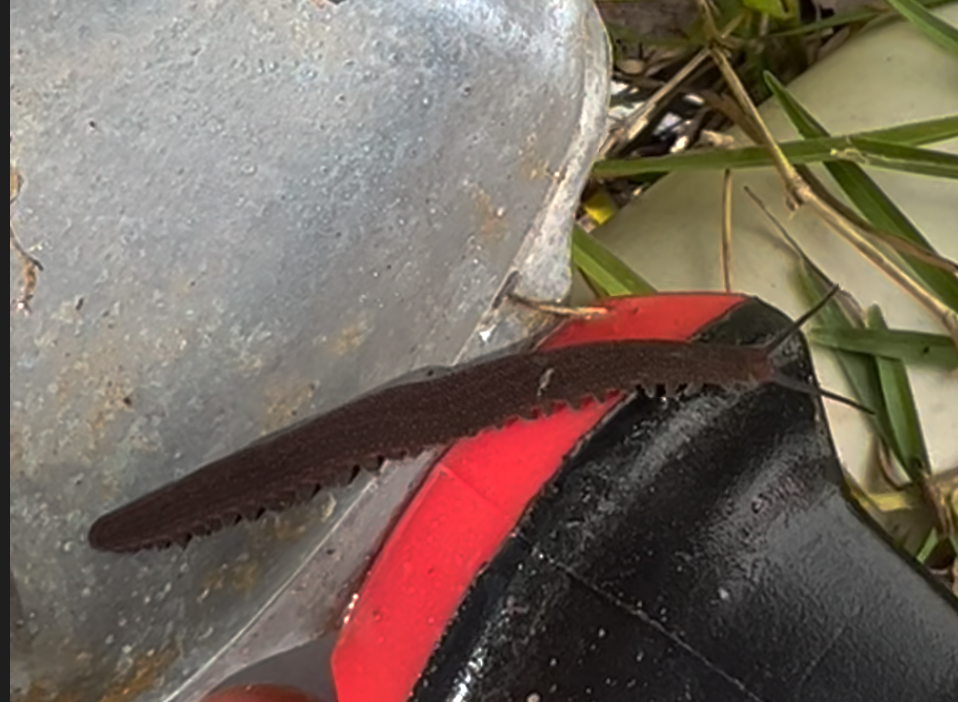
- Peripatus juanensis sighting on January 12, 2022. Found near a burst pipe in Puerto Rico.

Scientific classification
- Kingdom: Animalia
- Phylum: Onychophora
- Family: Peripatidae
- Genus: Peripatus
- Species: P. juanensis

Binomial name
- Peripatus juanensis Bouvier, 1900

Synonyms
- Peripatus dominicae juanensis Bouvier, 1900

= Peripatus juanensis =

Species of velvet worm

Peripatus juanensis is a species of velvet worm in the Peripatidae family discovered in Puerto Rico in 1900. As of 2018, it is the only velvet worm found in Puerto Rico. Females of this species have 31 or 32 pairs of legs; males have 27.

== Taxonomy ==
The first specimens were a pair caught by August Busck on Vieques, Puerto Rico during an entomological study. It was incorrectly described by Sitszungber Peters as Peripatus juliformis in 1880. These specimens were then formally described by Par E. L. Bouvier in 1900 as Peripatus juanensis after evaluating them from a collection in the Museum of Berlin. The two specimens described were females, one with 31 pairs of legs and a length of 35 mm and breadth of 4 mm, the other had 31 pairs of legs and measured 45 mm in length and 4 mm in breadth.

== Description ==
They are usually found under forest litter, rotten wood, under rocks and underground in moist shaded environments. While habitat preferences for this species are unknown, the confirmed habitats include Crecopia family fallen logs and moist underground crevices.

It differs from other Peripatidae by having tighter main papillae, having less prominent accessory papillae, having a single sexual tubercle instead of two on the pairs of pregenital legs on males, and having higher leg counts with females of this species having 31 or 32 pairs of legs; males having 27.
