= Peripatus ruber =

Scientific classification
- Kingdom: Animalia
- Phylum: Onychophora
- Family: Peripatidae
- Genus: Peripatus
- Species: P. ruber

Binomial name
- Peripatus ruber Fuhrmann, 1913

Species of velvet worm

Peripatus ruber is a species of velvet worm in the Peripatidae family. This species has 30 pairs of legs. The type locality is in Costa Rica.
