= Peripatus basilensis =

Scientific classification
- Kingdom: Animalia
- Phylum: Onychophora
- Family: Peripatidae
- Genus: Peripatus
- Species: P. basilensis

Binomial name
- Peripatus basilensis Brues, 1935

Synonyms
- Peripatus dominicae var. basilensis Brues, 1935

Species of velvet worm

Peripatus basilensis is a species of velvet worm in the Peripatidae family. This species has 26 to 31 pairs of legs. The type locality is in Haiti.
