= Peripatus evelinae =

Scientific classification
- Kingdom: Animalia
- Phylum: Onychophora
- Family: Peripatidae
- Genus: Peripatus
- Species: P. evelinae

Binomial name
- Peripatus evelinae (Marcus, 1937)

Synonyms
- Peripatus (Epiperipatus) evelinae (Marcus, 1937)

Species of velvet worm

Peripatus evelinae is a species of velvet worm in the Peripatidae family. The male of this species has 33 pairs of legs; females have 35 or 36 leg pairs. This species has more legs than any other species of Peripatus; the females of the other species have at most 34 leg pairs, and the males have at most 32. The original description of P. evelinae was based on two specimens and reported females with 32 and 34 leg pairs, but another examination of these specimens revealed a male with 33 leg pairs and a female with 35 leg pairs instead as well as numerous embryos, including females with 35 and 36 leg pairs. The male specimen is 44 mm long; the female is 65 mm long. The type locality is in Goiás, Brazil.
