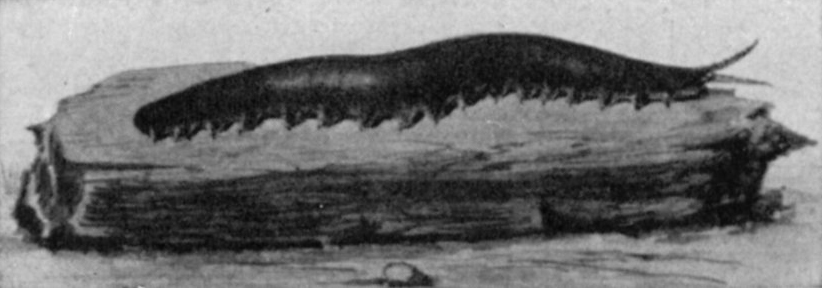

Scientific classification
- Kingdom: Animalia
- Phylum: Onychophora
- Family: Peripatidae
- Genus: Peripatus; Guilding, 1826

Species
- See text

= Peripatus =

Genus of Peripatid velvet worm and type genus of Peripatidae

Peripatus /pəˈrɪpətəs/ is a genus of velvet worms in the Peripatidae family. The name "peripatus" (unitalicised and uncapitalised) is also used to refer to the Onychophora as a whole, although this group comprises many other genera besides Peripatus. The genus Peripatus is found in Central America, the Caribbean and northern South America. This genus is viviparous, with mothers supplying nourishment to their embryos through a placenta.

== Description ==
Velvet worms in this genus may have as few as 24 or 25 pairs of legs (in P. antiguensis or P. dominicae, respectively) or as many as 36 leg pairs (in P. evelinae). Males in this genus bear crural tubercles on more than two pregenital leg pairs. The dorsal primary papillae in this genus feature an apical piece that is larger than the basal piece.

== Species ==
The genus contains the following species:

- Peripatus basilensis Brues, 1935 – Hispaniola (Haiti, Dominican Republic)
- Peripatus bouvieri Fuhrmann, 1913 – Colombia
- Peripatus brolemanni Bouvier, 1899 – Venezuela
- Peripatus danicus Bouvier, 1900 – Virgin Islands
- Peripatus darlingtoni Brues, 1935 – Hispaniola
- Peripatus dominicae Pollard, 1894 – Dominica
- Peripatus evelinae (Marcus, 1937) – Brazil
- Peripatus haitiensis Brues, 1913 – Hispaniola
- Peripatus heloisae Carvalho, 1941 – Brazil
- Peripatus juanensis Bouvier, 1900 – Puerto Rico
- Peripatus juliformis Guilding, 1826 – Saint Vincent Island; type species
- Peripatus lachauxensis Brues, 1935 – Hispaniola
- Peripatus manni Brues, 1913 – Hispaniola
- Peripatus ruber Fuhrmann, 1913 – Costa Rica
- Peripatus sedgwicki Bouvier, 1899 – Venezuela
- Peripatus swainsonae Cockerell, 1893 – Jamaica

Peripatus antiguensis Bouvier, 1899 and Peripatus bavaysi Bouvier, 1899 are considered nomina dubia by Oliveira et al. 2012.

=== Former species ===
- Mongeperipatus solorzanoi Morera-Brenes & Monge-Nájera, 2010, Solórzano's velvet worm – Costa Rica
