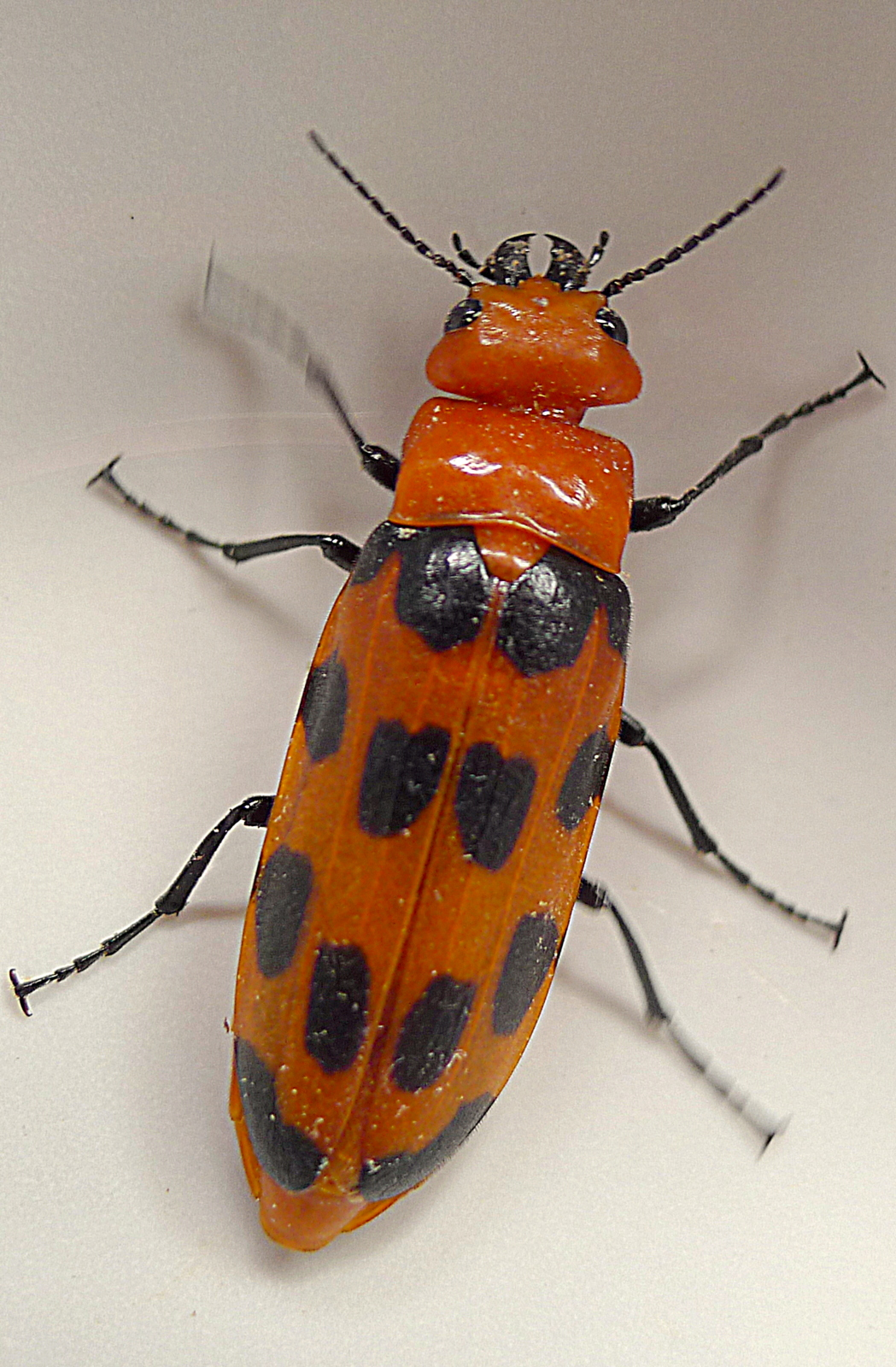
- Cissites maculata

Scientific classification
- Kingdom: Animalia
- Phylum: Arthropoda
- Class: Insecta
- Order: Coleoptera
- Suborder: Polyphaga
- Infraorder: Cucujiformia
- Family: Meloidae
- Subfamily: Nemognathinae
- Genus: Cissites; Latreille, 1804

= Cissites =

Genus of beetles

Cissites is a genus of blister beetles in the family Meloidae. There are at least four described species in Cissites.

== Species ==
These four species belong to the genus Cissites:

- Cissites auriculata (Champion, 1892) (big-eared blister beetle)
- Cissites cephalotes (Olivier, 1795)

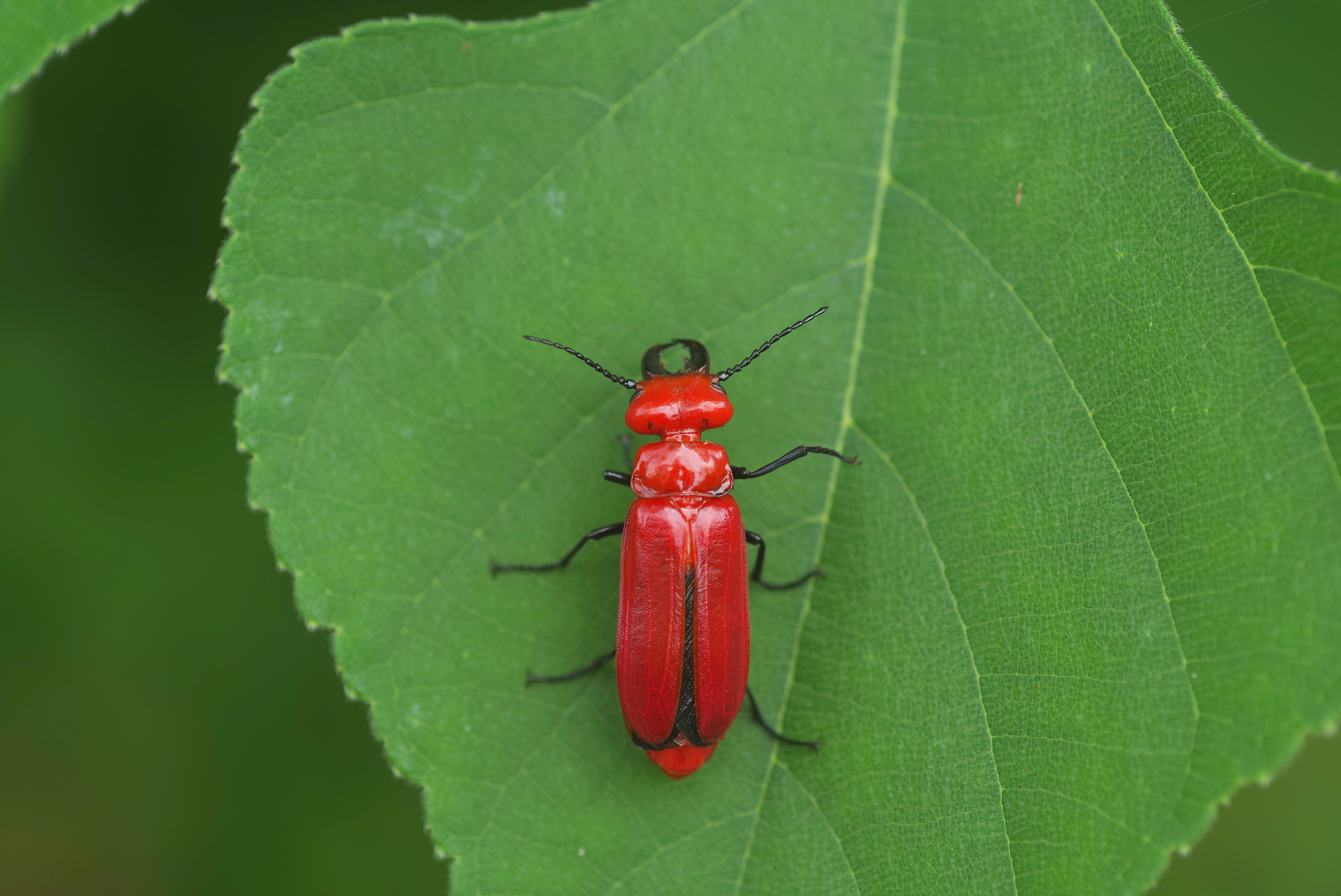
Cissites cephalotes (taiwan)

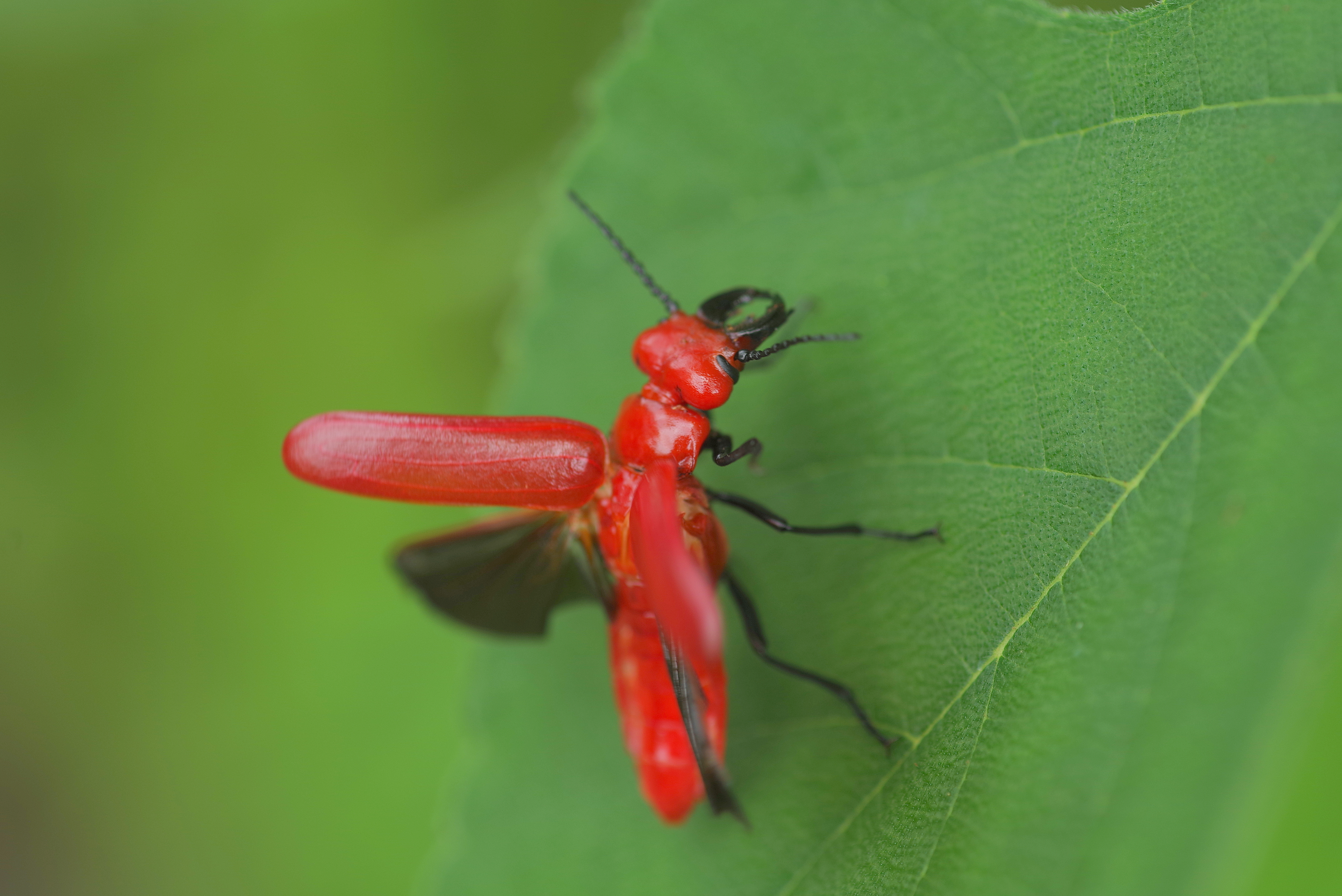
Cissites cephalotes (taiwan)

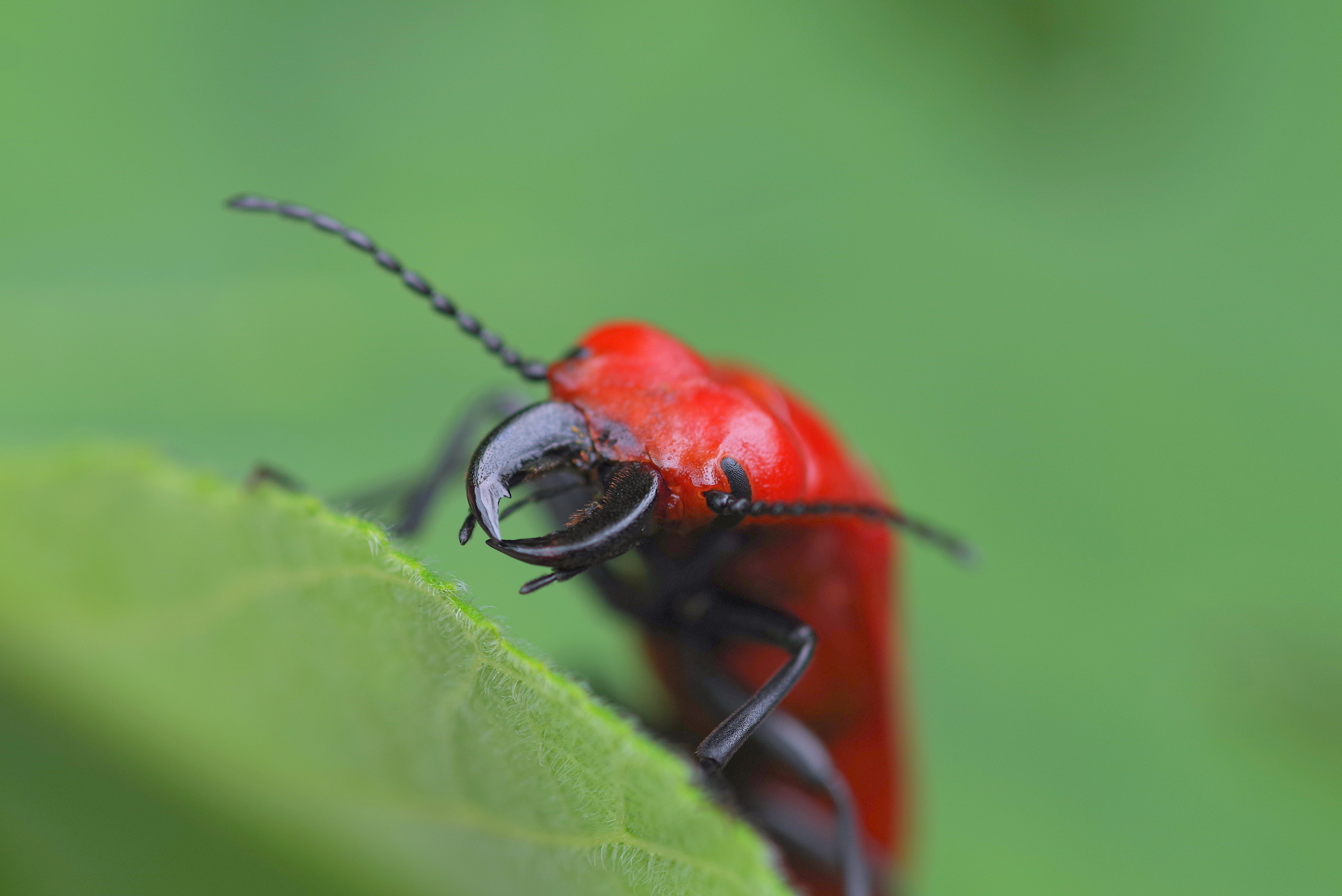
Cissites cephalotes (taiwan)

- Cissites maculata (Swederus, 1787)
- Cissites sasakii Kono, 1936
