= Cissites auriculata =

Scientific classification
- Domain: Eukaryota
- Kingdom: Animalia
- Phylum: Arthropoda
- Class: Insecta
- Order: Coleoptera
- Suborder: Polyphaga
- Infraorder: Cucujiformia
- Family: Meloidae
- Genus: Cissites
- Species: C. auriculata

Binomial name
- Cissites auriculata (Champion, 1892)

Species of beetle

Cissites auriculata, the big-eared blister beetle, is a species of blister beetle in the family Meloidae. It is found in the Caribbean and Central America.
