= Lansdown Guilding =

British clergyman and naturalist (1797–1831)

Lansdown Guilding (9 May 1797 – 22 October 1831) was a theologian and naturalist. He is best known for his works on the flora and fauna of St Vincent in particular and on the Caribbean in general. He wrote numerous illustrated papers for journals of scholarly societies in England including the first descriptions of velvet worms and scale insects in the ground pearl family.

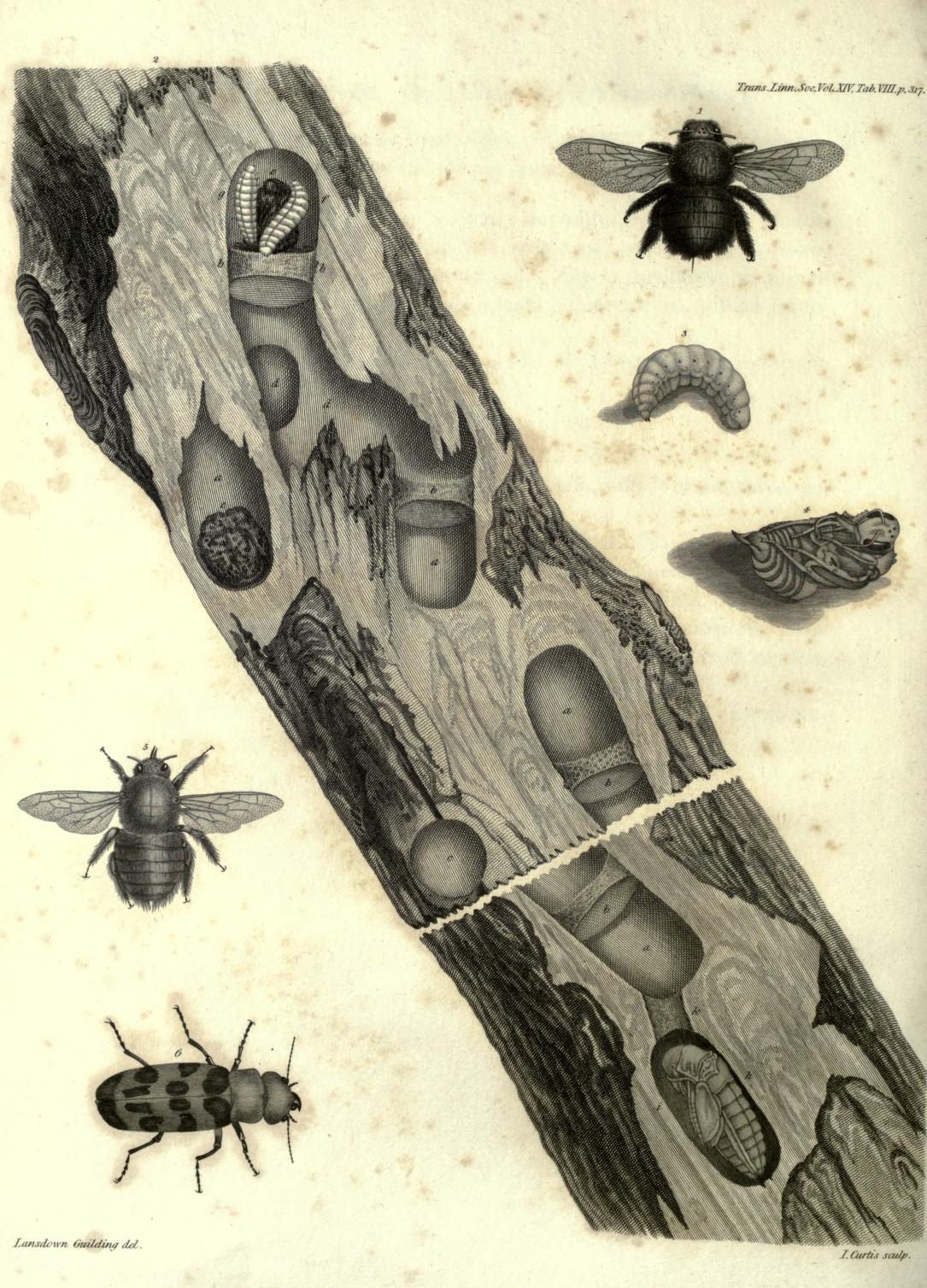
Guilding's illustration of the life history of Cissites maculata and Xylocopa

== Life and work ==
Guilding was born on 9 May 1797 in Kingstown, Saint Vincent and the Grenadines. He was one of six siblings, son of the Reverend John Guilding and his wife Sarah. In 1802, at the age of 5, he was sent to England, where he studied at Oxford University. In 1817, after receiving a B.A. degree, he returned to his home country. His father died in 1818, and he took up work as garrison chaplain and left for England in 1819. In 1821, Guilding travelled to England to marry Mary Hunt, daughter of the Rev. S. Hunt, rector of Wakerly and St. George's Church, Stamford. From 1824 to 1826 he disputed with Robert Herries for the right to payment for paupers' funerals. Herries claimed that Guilding had expunged the minutes of some meetings to change the vote of a vestry election, causing Herries to lose his position. Guilding stated that it was "just a misunderstanding”.

In 1818, Guilding was accepted as Fellow of the Linnean Society, and by 1820 he was corresponding with Joseph Dalton Hooker, Aylmer Bourke Lambert and other established scientists. Hooker wrote that Guilding was "an arrogant, demanding, ambitious, and often conceited individual, all too ready to ask for unusual favors". His first zoological paper was read at the Linnean Society and published in 1822. Guilding was a capable artist of plant and animal drawings. He prided himself on the accuracy of his work and his use of color. When his work was redrawn he criticized both the artist and the engraver. His book “An Account of the Botanic Gardens of the Island of St. Vincent” was published in Glasgow in 1825. Guilding was an excellent artist and engraver and he produced a "Table of Colours Arranged for Naturalists" in 1825 which may have been the first biological colour chart. This production was submitted to the Wernerian Natural History Society, where it was presented by the president, Professor Robert Jameson. He corresponded with Charles Darwin, providing him with notes on the natural history of the Caribbean region.

In 1826, Guilding published the first description of a member of the phylum Onychophora. He found what he thought was an unusual type of slug, and included it along with his Caribbean mollusks. He named this genus Peripatus (1826). He included an excellent watercolor painting of the specimen, and a mention to the defensive mechanism of sticky liquid squirts. A translation into English from Guilding's description, originally written in Latin, shows how he first classified the specimen in the Class Mollusca, and how astonished he was for discovering a new species.

He was also among the first to describe scale insects of the ground pearl family, Margarodidae. Guilding's announced "Fauna" and "Pomona occidentalis" were never completed. The manuscripts were lost, together with his table of colors.

Guilding's first wife died "in childbed” on 15 November 1827, leaving five children behind. A year later he married Charlotte Lydia Melville, of St. George's, Grenada. In 1831 he went on vacation to Bermuda, where he died on 22 October. The cause of death was not recorded.

== Bibliography ==
- Guilding L. (1825). An Account of the Botanic Garden in the Island of St. Vincent.
- Guilding L. (1825). "The natural history of Xylocopa teredo and Horia maculata". Transactions of the Linnean Society of London 14: 313-317. Table VIII.
- Guilding L. (1825). "Description of a new species of Oncidium". [Read 4 November 1823.] Transactions of the Linnean Society of London 14: 322-324, table IX.
