= Procambarus bouvieri =

Conservation status
- Endangered (IUCN 3.1)

Scientific classification
- Kingdom: Animalia
- Phylum: Arthropoda
- Class: Malacostraca
- Order: Decapoda
- Suborder: Pleocyemata
- Family: Cambaridae
- Genus: Procambarus
- Species: P. bouvieri

Binomial name
- Procambarus bouvieri (Ortmann, 1909)

Species of crayfish

Procambarus bouvieri is a species of crayfish in the genus Procambarus, endemic to the Michoacán region of Mexico. It was formerly the only species in the subgenus Mexicambarus.
