= Peripatus bouvieri =

Scientific classification
- Kingdom: Animalia
- Phylum: Onychophora
- Family: Peripatidae
- Genus: Peripatus
- Species: P. bouvieri

Binomial name
- Peripatus bouvieri Fuhrmann, 1913

Species of velvet worm

Peripatus bouvieri is a species of velvet worm in the Peripatidae family. This species has 28 or 29 pairs of legs. The type locality is in Colombia.
