= Alphonse Milne-Edwards =

Anglo-French zoologist (1835-1900)

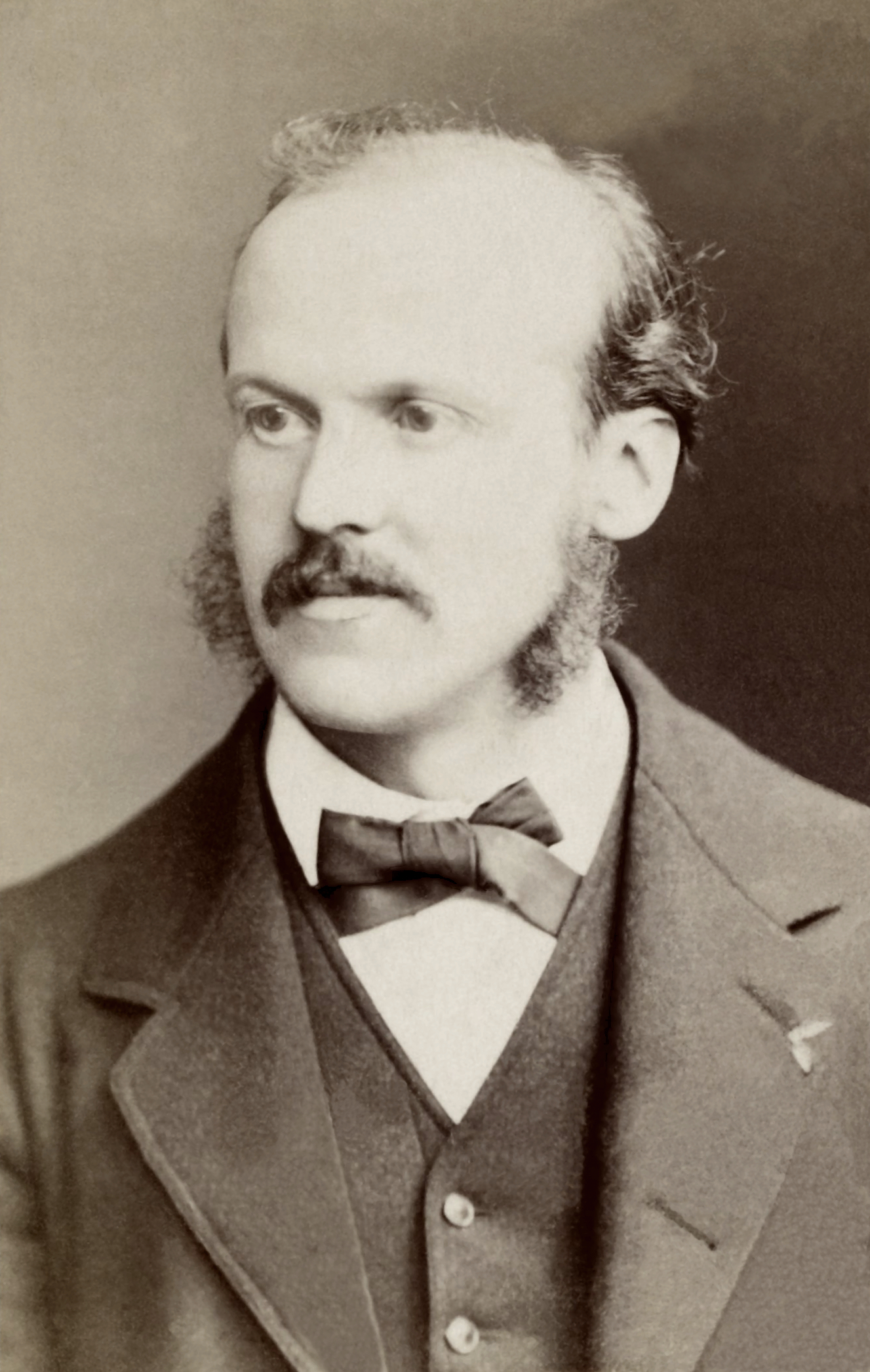
- Born: 13 October 1835
- Died: 21 April 1900 (aged 64)
- Known for: Discovery of tropical birds from prehistoric France
- Father: Henri Milne-Edwards
- Awards: Gold medal of the Royal Geographical Society
- Scientific career
- Institutions: Muséum National d'Histoire Naturelle
- Author abbrev. (botany): Milne-Edw.

Alphonse Milne-Edwards (Paris, 13 October 1835 – Paris, 21 April 1900) was a French mammalogist, ornithologist, and carcinologist. He was English in origin, the son of Henri Milne-Edwards and grandson of Bryan Edwards, a Jamaican planter who settled at Bruges (then in France).

Milne-Edwards obtained a medical degree in 1859 and became assistant to his father at the Jardin des Plantes in 1876. He became the director of the Muséum National d'Histoire Naturelle in 1891, devoting himself especially to fossil birds and deep-sea exploration. In 1881, he undertook a survey of the Gulf of Gascony with Léopold de Folin and worked aboard the Travailleur and the Talisman, researching the seas off the Canary Islands, the Cape Verde Islands, and the Azores. For this, he received a gold medal of the Royal Geographical Society.

His major ornithological works include Recherches Anatomiques et Paléontologiques pour servir a l'Histoire des Oiseaux Fossiles de la France published in two parts in 1867 and 1872, Recherches sur la Faune ornithologique étiente des iles Mascareignes et de Madagascar 1866–1874 and Recherches pour servir à l'histoire naturelle des mammifères 1868–1874. His study of fossils led to the discovery of tropical birds such as trogons and parrots from prehistoric France. He worked with Alfred Grandidier on L'Histoire politique, physique et naturelle de Madagascar.

Milne-Edwards also described at least one plant taxon; a species of gutta-percha collected from the island of Grande Comore, Comoros, by ornithologist Léon Humblot, which Milne-Edwards named Isonandra gutta. (I. gutta is now considered to be a taxonomic synonym of Palaquium gutta (Hook.) Burck, and a homonym of its basionym Isonandra gutta Hook..)

In 1879, Milne-Edwards was the first to describe the giant isopod Bathynomus giganteus in the Scientific journal Comptes rendus de l'Académie des Sciences.

A subspecies of Central American lizard, Holcosus festivus edwardsii Bocourt, 1873, is named in honor of Milne-Edwards.

== Selected publications ==
- 1850 : Rapport sur la production et l'emploi du sel en Angleterre, Paris.
- 1860 : « Histoire des crustacés podophthalmaires fossiles ». Annales des Sciences Naturelles, Séries 4, Zoologie, 14 : 129–294, pls. 1-10.
- 1862-1865 : « Monographie des crustacés de la famille cancériens ». Annales des sciences naturelles, zoologie, Séries 4, 18 (1862) : 31-85; 20 (1863) : 273-324; Séries 5, 1 (1864) : 31-88; 3 (1865) : 297–351.
- 1862 : « Sur l'existence de Crustacés de la famille des Raniniens pendant la période crétacée ». Comptes rendus de l'Académie des sciences de Paris, 55 : 492–494.
- 1864 : Recherches anatomiques, zoologiques et paléontologiques sur la famille des Chevrotains, Martinet, Paris.
- 1866-1873 : Recherches sur la faune ornithologique éteinte des iles Mascareignes et de Madagascar, Masson, Paris.
- 1867-1871 : Recherches anatomiques et paléontologiques pour servir à l'histoire des oiseaux fossiles de la France, Masson, Paris.
- 1868-1874 : Recherches pour servir à l'histoire naturelle des mammifères comprenant des considérations sur la classification de ces animaux par M. H. Milne Edwards, des observations sur l'hippopotame de Liberia et des études sur la faune de la Chine et du Tibet oriental, par M. Alphonse Milne-Edwards, Masson, Paris.
- 1873 : « Descriptions des quelques crustacés nouveaux ou peu connus provenant du Musée de M. C. Godeffroy ». Journal des Museum Godeffroy, 1 : 77–88, 12–13.
- 1879 : Notice sur les travaux scientifiques, Martinet, Paris.
- 1879 : with Giovanni Battista Brocchi (1772-1826) « Note sur quelques Crustacés fossiles appartenant au groupe des macrophthalmiens ». Bulletin de la Société philomathique de Paris, 3 : 113–117.
- 1879 : with Alfred Grandidier (1836-1921), Histoire physique, naturelle et politique de Madagascar. Paris.
- 1880 : « Reports on the results of dredging, under the supervision of Alexander Agassiz, in the Gulf of Mexico and in the Caribbean Sea, 1877, '78, '79, by the United States Coast Survey Steamer "Blake"... VIII. Études préliminaires sur les Crustacés ». Bulletin of the Museum of Comparative Zoology at Harvard College, 8 (1) : 1-68.
- 1881 : « Note sur quelques Crustacés fossiles des environs de Biarritz », Annales des sciences géologique (Paris), 11, article 2, pls. 21–22.
- 1882 : Éléments de l'Histoire naturelle des Animaux, Masson, Paris.
- 1888-1906 : Expéditions scientifiques du Travailleur et du Talisman pendant les années 1880, 1881, 1882, 1883, Masson, Paris.
- 1891 : Crustacés, Gauthier-Villars, Paris.
- 1893 : Notice sur quelques espèces d'oiseaux actuellement éteintes qui se trouvent représentées dans les collections du Muséum d'Histoire naturelle, Paris.
- 1897 : Histoire naturelle des animaux Masson, Paris.

== See also ==
- Category:Taxa named by Alphonse Milne-Edwards
