= Peripatopsis aereus =

Scientific classification
- Kingdom: Animalia
- Phylum: Onychophora
- Family: Peripatopsidae
- Genus: Peripatopsis
- Species: P. aereus

Binomial name
- Peripatopsis aereus Nieto Lawrence & Daniels, 2024

Species of velvet worm

Peripatopsis aereus is a species of velvet worm in the family Peripatopsidae. Also known as the Riviersonderend velvet worm, this species is known only from the Riviersonderend Mountains in South Africa. This velvet worm was discovered living in sympatry with another species in the same genus, P. lawrencei. These two sympatric species can be distinguished based on the number of legs: The species P. aereus has 18 pairs of legs, whereas the species P. lawrencei has only 17 leg pairs.

== Discovery ==
In 2009, a phylogenetic analysis of the genus Peripatopsis using molecular data first identified this velvet worm as a distinct lineage in a phylogenetic tree based on a single specimen. This species was first described in 2024 by the zoologists Julian A. Nieto Lawrence and Savel R. Daniels. They based the original description of this species on two specimens, a holotype and a paratype, both collected in 2022 in Oubos, near the site where the first specimen was found in the Riviersonderend Mountains in Western Cape province in South Africa. These specimens were found inside or under decaying logs or leaf litter in a patch of Afromontane forest. The type specimens are deposited in the South African Museum of Cape Town.

== Description ==
The size of the specimens ranges from 34 mm in length (in the paratype) to 38 mm in length (in the holotype). All three specimens feature 18 pairs of legs, with the last pair reduced in size. Each leg features two claws, including the last pair of legs.

The dorsal surface is dark brown, and the ventral surface is golden brown. Each surface features a consistent color, with no lines or variations in color visible. The species name is the Latin word for bronze, alluding to the bronze-like ventral surface of this velvet worm. The integument of this species features primary dermal papillae that are densely packed, with deep ridges between papillae structures. The dermal papillae are conical, with fifteen scale ranks on the dorsal primary papillae and nine scale ranks on the ventral primary papillae.

This velvet worm exhibits traits shared with other species of Peripatopsis, such as the reduced size of the last leg pair. The species P. aereus shares more traits with the sympatric species P. lawrencei. For example, both species feature two claws on each foot, including the feet on the last leg pair.

Several other traits, however, distinguish P. aereus from P. lawrencei. For example, the species P. lawrencei always has 17 pairs of legs, whereas P. aereus has 18 leg pairs. Furthermore, the species P. lawrencei features only seven scale ranks on the dorsal papillae and only four on the ventral papillae, markedly fewer than observed in P. aereus, which features fifteen on the dorsal papillae and nine on the ventral papillae. Moreover, the ventral surface of P. lawrencei is usually cream white but is sometimes pale orange or yellow. Thus, the consistent golden brown of the ventral surface of P. aereus also distinguishes this species from P. lawrencei.

== Phylogeny ==
The molecular evidence places P. aereus on a branch in a phylogenetic tree with a sister group that includes the three species P. capensis, P. sedgwicki, and P. moseleyi, each in a separate clade corresponding to an associated species complex within this sister group. The sympatric species P. lawrencei, for example, appears in the clade corresponding to the P. capensis species complex. The molecular data suggest a relatively ancient origin of P. aereus, with this lineage diverging from its sister group an estimated 13.68 million years ago, in the Miocene epoch.
