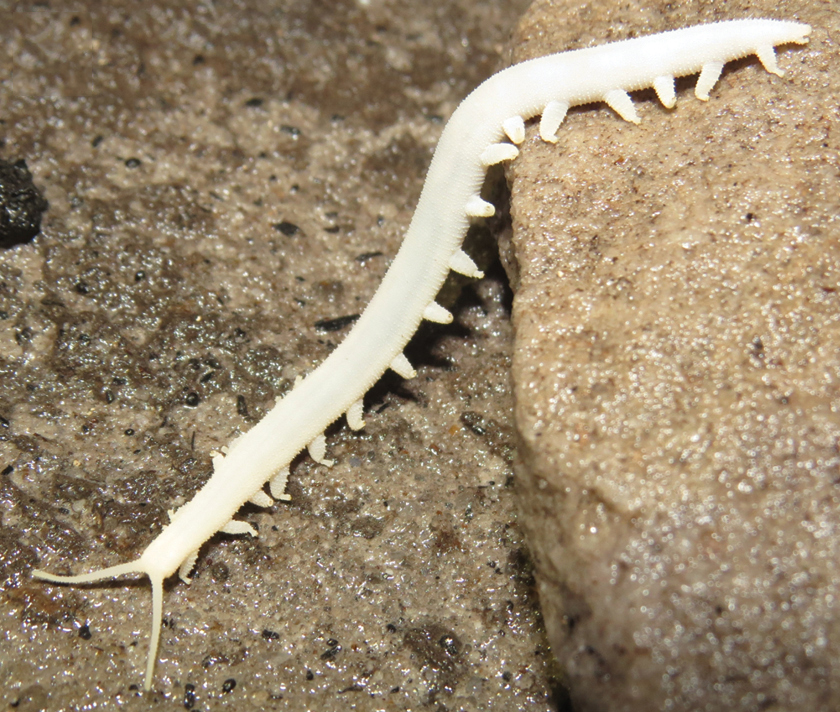

Conservation status
- Vulnerable (IUCN 3.1)

Scientific classification
- Kingdom: Animalia
- Phylum: Onychophora
- Family: Peripatopsidae
- Genus: Peripatopsis
- Species: P. alba

Binomial name
- Peripatopsis alba Lawrence, 1931

= Peripatopsis alba =

Species of basal eyeless Peripatopsid velvet worm

Peripatopsis alba, also known as the white cave velvet worm, is a species of velvet worm in the family Peripatopsidae. This species is notable as one of only two species of velvet worm known to be troglobitic; the only other velvet worm known to be a troglobiont is Speleoperipatus spelaeus. The white cave velvet worm is rare and limited to one cave system on Table Mountain in South Africa.

== Discovery ==
This species was first described by the South African zoologist Reginald F. Lawrence in 1931 based on four specimens, including two type specimens, an adult male and a subadult female. The male measures 48 mm in length, whereas the female is smaller, only 32 mm long. Lawrence collected these specimens from Wynberg Cave near the top of Table Mountain, including some from the main gallery, about 100 feet (30 m) below the surface. These velvet worms were found under stones or climbing up the wet walls of the cave.

== Description ==
This species has no eyes and lacks pigmentation. The body of this species is a striking white, with a thin opaque stripe running from the head down the back but fading near the posterior end of the body. This species has 18 pairs of clawed legs, with the last pair reduced. In the male, the penultimate pair is also smaller than the preceding pair. The soles of the feet feature three pads with the middle pad two or three times as broad as the proximal pad. The claws are a dirty white tipped with brown. Like other velvet worms in the genus Peripatopsis, this species has three distal papillae on each foot, two anterior and one posterior.

The feet are elongated, and the legs are notably longer and more slender than in other species of Peripatopsis. In the larger male type specimen, for example, the legs in the middle of the body measure 2.1 to 2.6 mm in length, and the feet are 0.8 to 0.9 mm long. Long legs reflect an adaptation to life in the dark, where the velvet worm can use these legs to explore its surroundings, much as a blind person might use a cane. This species also features longer antennae, another characteristic common among troglobitic species. The other troglobitic species of velvet worm, S. spelaeus, for example, also lacks pigment, has no eyes, and features legs and antennae that are unusually long.

== Phylogeny ==
As noted by Lawrence, this species resembles its close relative P. balfouri, both in terms of the number of legs and the conical papillae on the integument. He describes P. alba as an eyeless version of P. balfouri, but with longer legs and lacking pigment. The species P. balfouri is also close in terms of geography, living just outside the cave where P. alba was discovered. Phylogenetic analysis using molecular data confirms that P. alba is part of the P. balfouri species complex but maintains P. alba as a separate species. An analysis of the molecular evidence places P. alba in its own clade on a branch of a phylogenetic tree with a sister group formed by two other clades, one belonging to P. balfouri and the other comprising P. bolandi and P. purpureus.

== Distribution and habitat ==
Peripatopsis alba is known only from two caves, Wynberg Cave and Bats' Cave, both part of a cave system about 750 m above sea level on Table Mountain in South Africa. This cave system is the third largest sandstone cave system in the world, and Wynberg and Bats' caves are the most frequently visited of the Table Mountain caves. Wynberg Cave measures 300 m in length and reaches a maximum depth of 50 m, whereas Bats' Cave is shorter (only 60 m long) but deeper.

The walls of Wynberg Cave is an extensive labyrinth of horizontal galleries with surfaces kept damp by water seeping in through fissures in the rock. The only vegetation in this cave is a greyish lichen. Bats' Cave is similarly humid with a perennial pool in a small deep zone chamber. Like other deep caves with small entrances, these caves maintain a fairly constant temperature and humidity over the course of the day and through the year.

The white cave velvet worm preys on cave crickets, but prey is not plentiful, so the population density is low. This velvet worm is found only in the deep zone of the caves under stones or on damp walls where moisture is plentiful. This species is so sensitive to its environment that all attempts to keep them alive outside the cave system have failed. Lawrence collected two live specimens and kept them under conditions that would have sustained other Peripatopsis species, but both died 24 hours later.

== Conservation ==
This species is listed as Vulnerable on the IUCN Red List in light of its restricted distribution, small population, and the threat of collection by humans and disruption by cavers. This species is so scarce that a survey conducted from 1995 to 1996 found P. alba to be the rarest of all the Table Mountain troglobites. Furthermore, this species is so stenotopic and the ecosystem of this cave system is so fragile that even small changes in the environment could be disastrous and cause the extinction of this species.
