= Peripatopsis mira =

Scientific classification
- Kingdom: Animalia
- Phylum: Onychophora
- Family: Peripatopsidae
- Genus: Peripatopsis
- Species: P. mira

Binomial name
- Peripatopsis mira Barnes, Reiss & Daniels, 2020

Species of velvet worm

Peripatopsis mira is a species of velvet worm in the family Peripatopsidae. This species is a clade in the P. clavigera species complex. This species has 17 pairs of legs, varies from slate black to charcoal, and is found on the south-facing slope of the Outeniqua mountain range in Western Cape province in South Africa.
