= Peripatopsis intermedia =

Scientific classification
- Kingdom: Animalia
- Phylum: Onychophora
- Family: Peripatopsidae
- Genus: Peripatopsis
- Species: P. intermedia

Binomial name
- Peripatopsis intermedia Hutchinson, 1928

Species of velvet worm

Peripatopsis intermedia is a species of velvet worm in the Peripatopsidae family. This species is about 33 mm long and has 19 pairs of legs: 18 pregenital leg pairs plus a last pair of much reduced legs. The type locality is in South Africa. Although some authorities doubt the validity of this species and deem it to be a junior synonym of P. balfouri, others consider these two to be separate species, citing the distance (168 km) between their type localities.
