= Peripatopsis mellaria =

Scientific classification
- Kingdom: Animalia
- Phylum: Onychophora
- Family: Peripatopsidae
- Genus: Peripatopsis
- Species: P. mellaria

Binomial name
- Peripatopsis mellaria Barnes, Reiss & Daniels, 2020

Species of velvet worm

Peripatopsis mellaria is a species of velvet worm in the family Peripatopsidae. This species is a clade in the P. clavigera species complex. This species has 17 pairs of legs, varies from slate black to charcoal, and ranges from 11 mm to 20 mm in length. Also known as the Outeniqua velvet worm, this species is found in forests along the coast in Western Cape province in South Africa.
