= Peripatopsis cederbergiensis =

Scientific classification
- Kingdom: Animalia
- Phylum: Onychophora
- Family: Peripatopsidae
- Genus: Peripatopsis
- Species: P. cederbergiensis

Binomial name
- Peripatopsis cederbergiensis Daniels et al., 2013

Species of velvet worm

Peripatopsis cederbergiensis is a species of velvet worm in the family Peripatopsidae. This species is a clade in the P. balfouri species complex. Males of this species have 17 clawed legs with the last pair highly reduced, whereas females have a complete foot with claws on the reduced leg. This species is charcoal black in color and ranges from 9 mm to 15 mm in length. Also known as the Cederberg velvet worm, this species is endemic to the Cederberg Mountains of South Africa.
