= Peripatopsis edenensis =

Scientific classification
- Kingdom: Animalia
- Phylum: Onychophora
- Family: Peripatopsidae
- Genus: Peripatopsis
- Species: P. edenensis

Binomial name
- Peripatopsis edenensis Barnes, Reiss & Daniels, 2020

Species of velvet worm

Peripatopsis edenensis is a species of velvet worm in the family Peripatopsidae. This species is a clade in the P. clavigera species complex. This species has 16 pairs of legs, varies from slate black to charcoal, and ranges from 4 mm to 17 mm in length. Also known as the Eden velvet worm, this species is found in the Garden of Eden Nature Reserve and in forests along the coast of Western Cape province in South Africa.
