= Peripatopsis ferox =

Scientific classification
- Kingdom: Animalia
- Phylum: Onychophora
- Family: Peripatopsidae
- Genus: Peripatopsis
- Species: P. ferox

Binomial name
- Peripatopsis ferox Barnes, Reiss & Daniels, 2020

Species of velvet worm

Peripatopsis ferox is a species of velvet worm in the family Peripatopsidae. This species is a clade in the P. clavigera species complex. This species has 17 pairs of legs, varies from slate black to brown, and ranges from 17 mm to 28 mm in length. Also known as the Wilderness velvet worm, this species has an extensive distribution across many patches of forest in Western Cape province in South Africa.
