= Peripatopsis birgeri =

Scientific classification
- Kingdom: Animalia
- Phylum: Onychophora
- Family: Peripatopsidae
- Genus: Peripatopsis
- Species: P. birgeri

Binomial name
- Peripatopsis birgeri Ruhberg & Daniels, 2013

Species of velvet worm

Peripatopsis birgeri is a species of velvet worm in the family Peripatopsidae. This species is a clade in the P. moseleyi species complex. The number of legs in this species varies from 21 pregenital pairs (plus one genital pair) to 22 pregenital pairs (plus one genital pair). Live animals are light green, brown, or black with a distinct pale head collar; the ventral surface is creamy white. Males range from 23 mm to 40 mm in length; females range from 28 mm to 40 mm in length. Also known as the Mount Currie velvet worm, this species is known only from the Mount Currie Nature Reserve in South Africa.
