= Peripatopsis hamerae =

Scientific classification
- Kingdom: Animalia
- Phylum: Onychophora
- Family: Peripatopsidae
- Genus: Peripatopsis
- Species: P. hamerae

Binomial name
- Peripatopsis hamerae Ruhberg & Daniels, 2013

Species of velvet worm

Peripatopsis hamerae is a species of velvet worm in the family Peripatopsidae. This species is a clade in the P. moseleyi species complex. The original description of this species is based on one specimen of each sex, each measuring 22 mm in length with a black dorsal surface and creamy white ventral surface. The male of this species has 22 pairs of pregenital legs and one pair of genital legs; the female has 23 pairs of pregenital legs and one pair of genital legs. Also known as the Kamala velvet worm, this species is known only from Groot Bruintjieshoogte in South Africa.
