= Peripatopsis tulbaghensis =

Scientific classification
- Kingdom: Animalia
- Phylum: Onychophora
- Family: Peripatopsidae
- Genus: Peripatopsis
- Species: P. tulbaghensis

Binomial name
- Peripatopsis tulbaghensis Barnes, Reiss & Daniels, 2020

Species of velvet worm

Peripatopsis tulbaghensis is a species of velvet worm in the family Peripatopsidae. This species is dark brown with 17 pairs of legs and ranges from 8 mm to 32 mm in length. Also known as the Tulbagh velvet worm, this species is found in Groot Winterhoek mountain region in South Africa.
