= Peripatopsis purpureus =

Scientific classification
- Kingdom: Animalia
- Phylum: Onychophora
- Family: Peripatopsidae
- Genus: Peripatopsis
- Species: P. purpureus

Binomial name
- Peripatopsis purpureus Daniels et al., 2013

Species of velvet worm

Peripatopsis purpureus is a species of velvet worm in the family Peripatopsidae. This species is a clade in the P. balfouri species complex. Males of this species have 17 clawed legs with the last pair highly reduced, whereas females have a complete foot with claws on the reduced leg. Named for its purple-blue color, this species is found in the Western Cape Province of South Africa. This species ranges between 13 mm to 26 mm in length.
