= Peripatopsis janni =

Scientific classification
- Kingdom: Animalia
- Phylum: Onychophora
- Family: Peripatopsidae
- Genus: Peripatopsis
- Species: P. janni

Binomial name
- Peripatopsis janni Ruhberg & Daniels, 2013

Species of velvet worm

Peripatopsis janni is a species of velvet worm in the family Peripatopsidae. This species is a clade in the P. moseleyi species complex. The original description of this species is based on male specimens ranging from 15 mm to 30 mm in length. Live animals are dark green on the dorsal surface but greyish white on the ventral surface. The number of legs in males of this species varies from 21 pregenital pairs (plus one genital pair) to 22 pregenital pairs (plus one genital pair). Also known as the Amathole velvet worm, this species is found in the Amathole mountains in South Africa.
