= Swansea Cave =

Cave in Jamaica

- Location within Jamaica
- Location: Saint Catherine Parish, Jamaica
- Coordinates: 18°10′31″N 77°09′33″W
- Length: 1170 m
- Elevation: 385 m
- Geology: white limestone

Swansea Cave is a cave and palaeontological site in the Saint Catherine Parish of south-eastern Jamaica.

== Description ==
The site lies on private land in the Worthy Park district at an altitude of 385 m above sea level and is surrounded by forest and sugarcane cultivation. The geology is white limestone. The cave is a dry, fossil stream passage, 1170 m in length, which has collapsed in three places. The main entrance is 10 m high by 12 m wide.

=== Fauna ===
The cave contains a large, mixed roost of over 10,000 bats between the second and third collapse points, as well as small numbers of the Jamaican fruit bat near the main entrance. Invertebrates found in the cave include the American cockroach, cave crickets, amblypygids, and the rare onychophoran species Speleoperipatus spelaeus. Fossil animals discovered at the site include the Jamaican flightless ibis (Xenicibis xympithecus).
