= Peripatopsis bolandi =

Scientific classification
- Kingdom: Animalia
- Phylum: Onychophora
- Family: Peripatopsidae
- Genus: Peripatopsis
- Species: P. bolandi

Binomial name
- Peripatopsis bolandi Daniels et al., 2013

Species of velvet worm

Peripatopsis bolandi is a species of velvet worm in the family Peripatopsidae. This species is a clade in the P. balfouri species complex and ranges from 18 mm to 24 mm in length. Also known as the Boland velvet worm, this species is found in the Hottentots Holland Mountain region in South Africa. This species features 17 or 18 pairs of legs.
