= Peripatopsis storchi =

Scientific classification
- Kingdom: Animalia
- Phylum: Onychophora
- Family: Peripatopsidae
- Genus: Peripatopsis
- Species: P. storchi

Binomial name
- Peripatopsis storchi Ruhberg & Daniels, 2013

Species of velvet worm

Peripatopsis storchi is a species of velvet worm in the family Peripatopsidae. This species is a clade in the P. moseleyi species complex. The number of legs in this species ranges from 21 pregenital pairs (plus one genital pair) to 23 pregenital pairs (plus one genital pair). Males of this species range from 12 mm to 22 mm in length, and females range from 22 mm to 36 mm in length, but live animals can stretch to 50 mm while walking. Also known as the Katberg velvet worm, this species is known only from the Katberg forest in South Africa.
