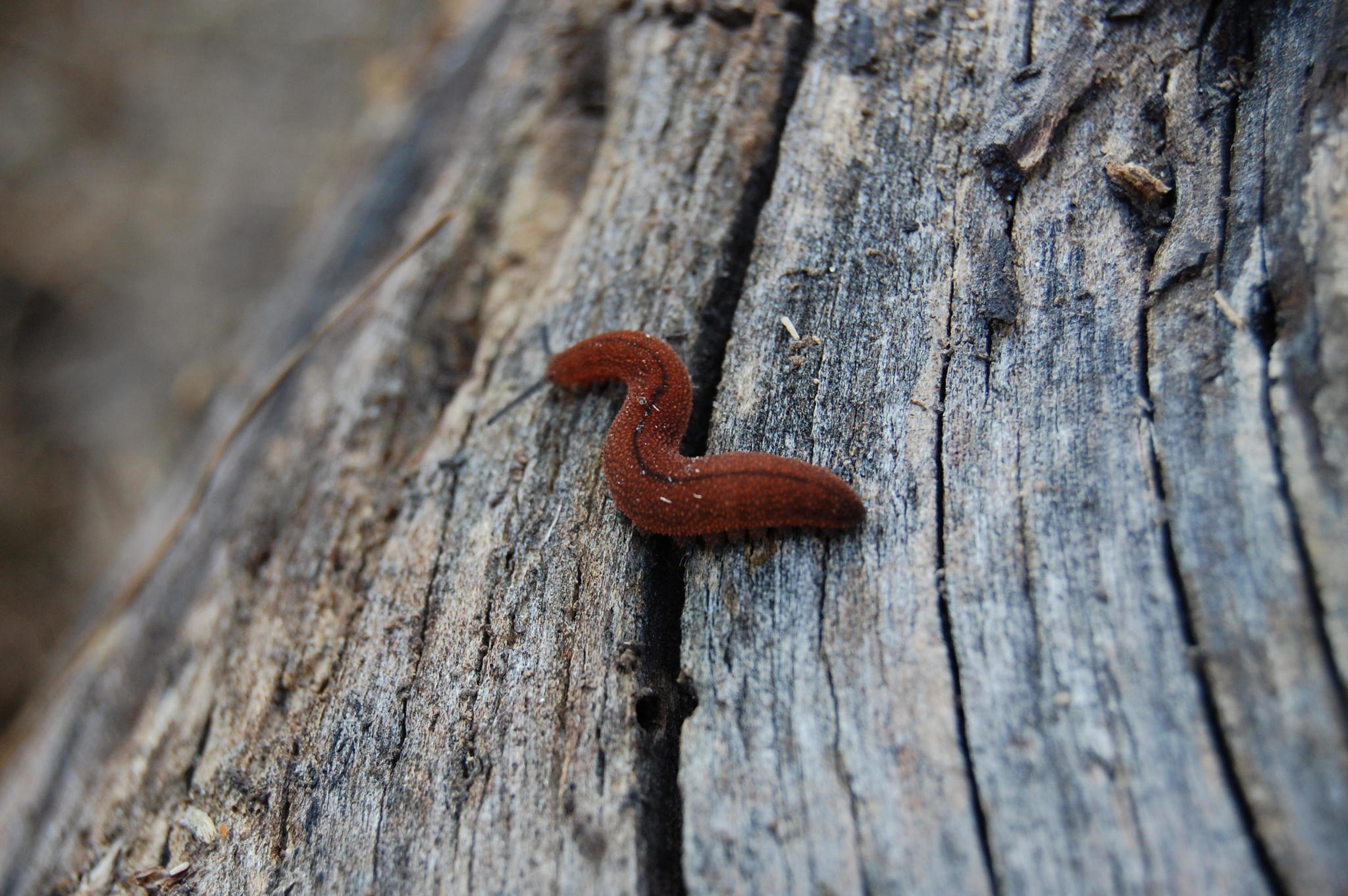

Scientific classification
- Kingdom: Animalia
- Phylum: Onychophora
- Family: Peripatopsidae
- Genus: Peripatopsis
- Species: P. moseleyi

Binomial name
- Peripatopsis moseleyi (Wood-Mason, 1879)

Synonyms
- Peripatus moseleyi Wood-Mason, 1879

= Peripatopsis moseleyi =

Species of velvet worm

Peripatopsis moseleyi is a species of velvet worm in the Peripatopsidae family. Males of this species (as traditionally defined) have 20 to 24 pairs of legs with claws (plus one pair without claws); females have 19 to 23 pairs of legs with claws (plus one pair without claws). Females range from 11 mm to 75 mm in length, whereas males range from 9 mm to 50 mm. The type locality is in South Africa.

More recent phylogenetic results indicate that this species as traditionally defined is instead a species complex (P. moseleyi sensu lato) containing five genetically distinct clades, now described as separate species: P. birgeri, P. hamerae, P. janni, P. stortchi, and P. moseleyi sensu stricto. Males of this species more narrowly defined (P. moseleyi sensu stricto) have 22 to 24 pregenital pairs of legs (plus one genital pair); females have 23 pregenital pairs (plus one genital pair). Female specimens range from 42 mm to 60 mm in length; males range from 22 mm to 40 mm in length.
