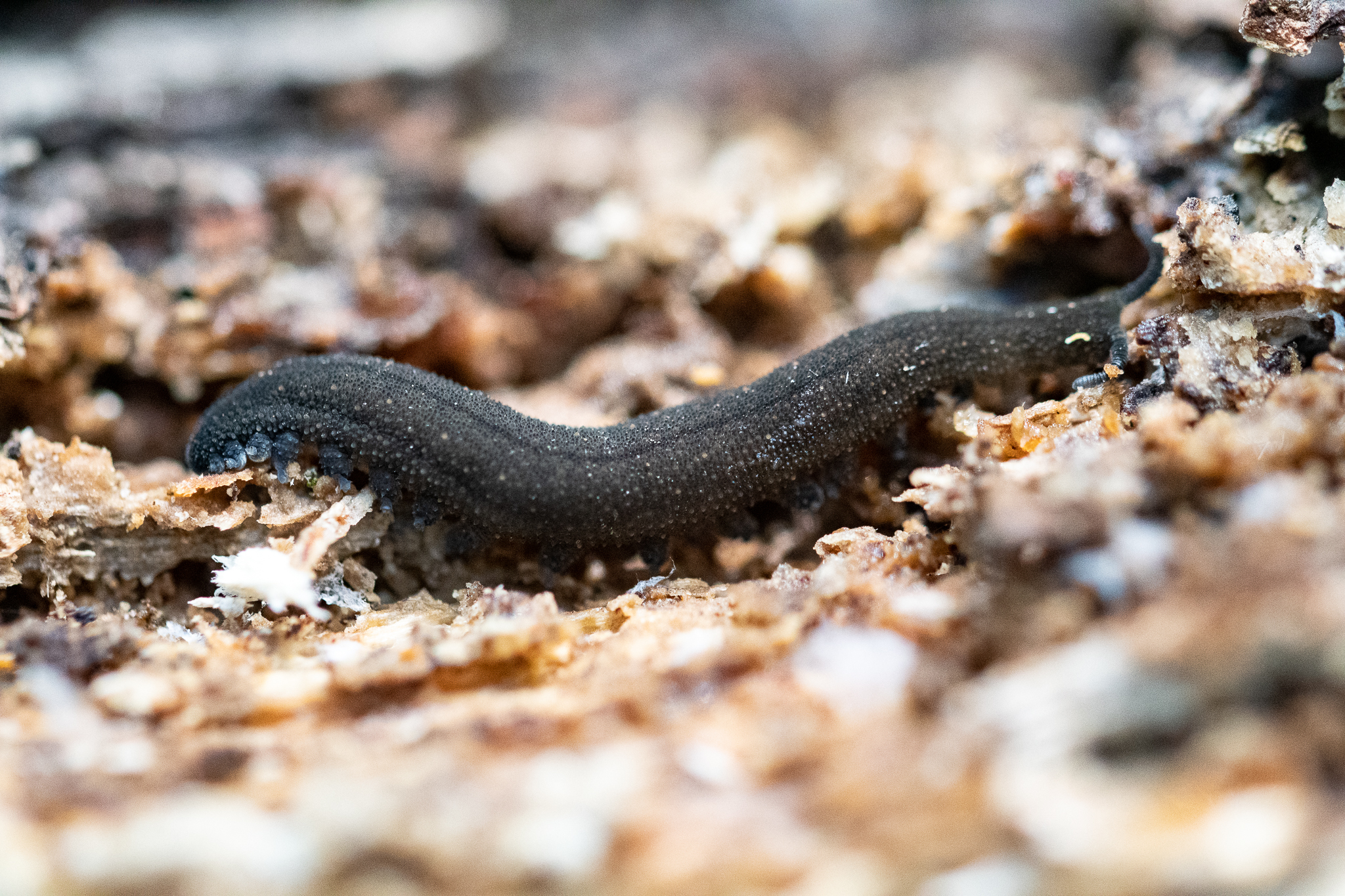

Scientific classification
- Kingdom: Animalia
- Phylum: Onychophora
- Family: Peripatopsidae
- Genus: Peripatopsis
- Species: P. overbergiensis

Binomial name
- Peripatopsis overbergiensis McDonald et al., 2012

= Peripatopsis overbergiensis =

Species of velvet worm

Peripatopsis overbergiensis, the Overberg velvet worm, is a species of velvet worm in the Peripatopsidae family. This species usually has 19 pairs of legs: 18 pregenital leg pairs plus one last pair that is strongly reduced and without claws or spinous pads. Some individuals, however, have only 18 leg pairs (i.e., 17 pregenital leg pairs). This species is limited to the Overberg region of South Africa.
