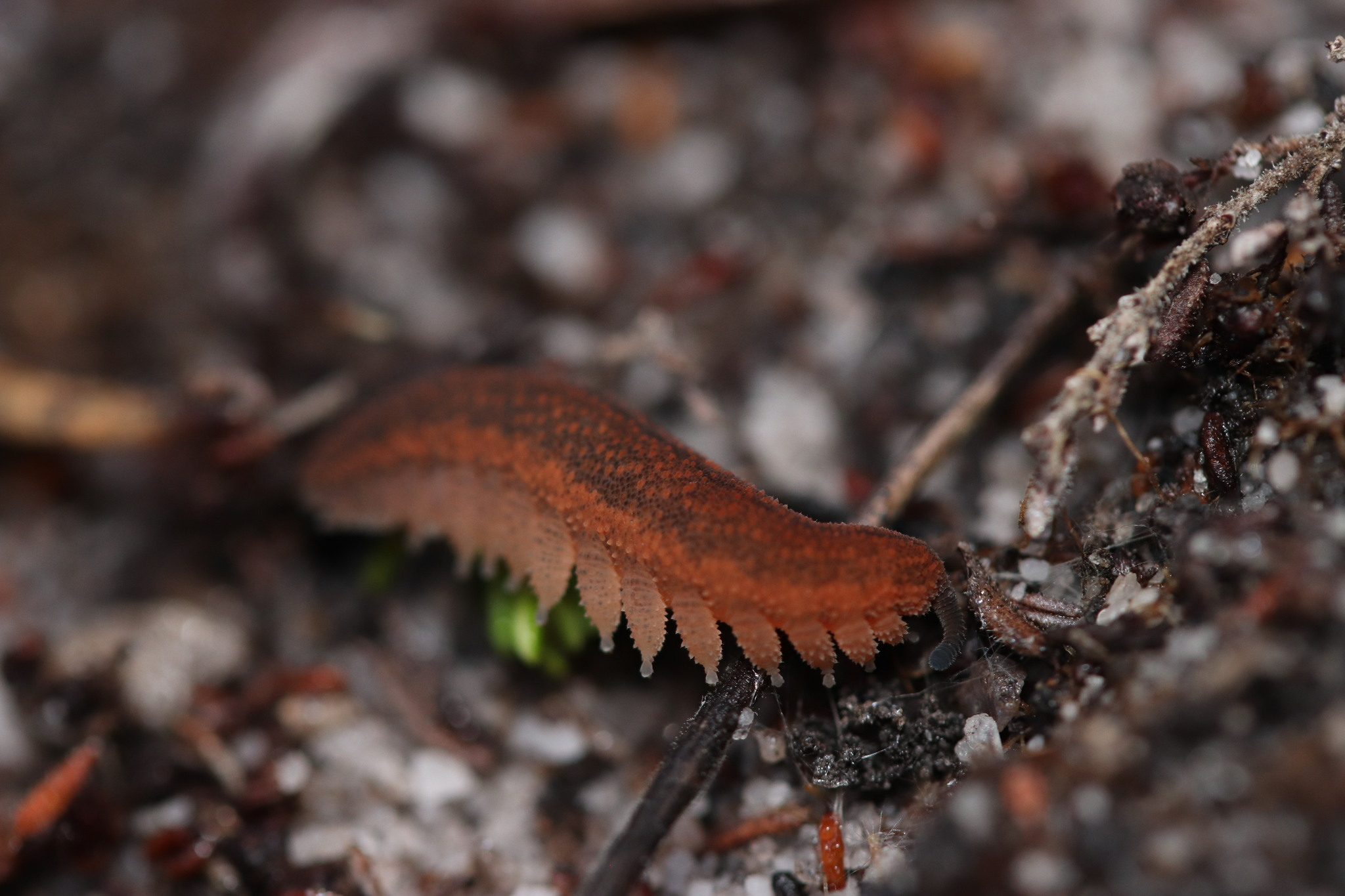

Scientific classification
- Kingdom: Animalia
- Phylum: Onychophora
- Family: Peripatopsidae
- Genus: Peripatopsis
- Species: P. lawrencei

Binomial name
- Peripatopsis lawrencei McDonald et al., 2012

= Peripatopsis lawrencei =

Species of velvet worm

Peripatopsis lawrencei is a species of velvet worm in the Peripatopsidae family. This species has 17 pairs of legs, with the last pair reduced in size but featuring two claws on each leg. This species is restricted to the Theewaterskloof-Overstrand region of South Africa.
