= Speleoperipatus =

Conservation status
- Critically Endangered (IUCN 2.3)

Scientific classification
- Kingdom: Animalia
- Phylum: Onychophora
- Family: Peripatidae
- Genus: Speleoperipatus; Peck, 1975
- Species: S. spelaeus

Binomial name
- Speleoperipatus spelaeus Peck, 1975

Genus and species of critically endangered eyeless Peripatid velvet worm

Speleoperipatus is a monospecific genus of velvet worm in the family Peripatidae, containing the single species Speleoperipatus spelaeus. This species is a pale greenish yellow, almost white, with 19 to 23 pairs of legs and no eyes. Specimens range from 27 mm to 34 mm in length. The minimum number of leg pairs found in this species (19) is also the minimum number found in the family Peripatidae. This velvet worm is viviparous, with mothers supplying nourishment to their embryos through a placenta.

== Distribution and habitat ==
Speleoperipatus spelaeus is a troglobiont known only from two cave systems in northern St. Catherine, Jamaica; Pedro Great Cave and Swansea Cave.

One other troglobitic velvet worm species is known; Peripatopsis alba, from Wynberg Cave and Bats' Cave, on Table Mountain, South Africa.

== Conservation ==
Only twelve specimens have been found as of 2025: Four specimens were collected by Dr. Stewart Peck in 1975 at Pedro Great Cave, one individual was found (not collected, but confirmed photographically by Peck) at Swansea Cave by members of the Jamaican Cave Organisation (JCO) in 2010, and two more found and photographed at Swansea Cave by the JCO in 2021. Five specimens were observed at Pedro Great Cave in 2025. The species is listed as Critically Endangered on the IUCN Red List.
