= Mesoperipatus =

Conservation status
- Data Deficient (IUCN 2.3)

Scientific classification
- Kingdom: Animalia
- Phylum: Onychophora
- Family: Peripatidae
- Genus: Mesoperipatus; Evans, 1901
- Species: M. tholloni

Binomial name
- Mesoperipatus tholloni (Bouvier, 1898)

Genus and species of basal Peripatid velvet worm

Mesoperipatus is a monospecific genus of velvet worm in the Peripatidae family, containing a single species Mesoperipatus tholloni. It is found in Gabon, making it the only known species of velvet worm in the tropics of Africa, and the only known species of peripatid velvet worm in Africa. Females of this species have 24 to 27 pairs of legs; males have 23 or 24. This species is viviparous, but too little is known of its embryology to describe its reproductive mode in any more detail; the presence of a placenta, for example, has not been confirmed.

== Conservation ==
In terms of conservation status, this species is listed as Data Deficient on the IUCN Red List.
