= Peripatopsis leonina =

Conservation status
- Critically Endangered (IUCN 3.1)

Scientific classification
- Kingdom: Animalia
- Phylum: Onychophora
- Family: Peripatopsidae
- Genus: Peripatopsis
- Species: P. leonina

Binomial name
- Peripatopsis leonina Purcell, 1899

Species of velvet worm

Peripatopsis leonina, commonly known as the Lion's Hill velvet worm, is a species of velvet worm in the family Peripatopsidae. Endemic to South Africa, it has not been seen since 1912 and is thought to be critically endangered or possibly extinct.

== Taxonomy and history ==
Peripatopsis leonina was described by William Frederick Purcell in 1899, but no holotype was designated. Later publications referred to "paratypoids" and "ex types" of this species deposited in the Zoologisches Museum in Hamburg, Germany, however, the type status of these specimens is unclear. This species was last recorded in 1912 and requires taxonomic revision.

== Distribution and habitat ==
Peripatopsis leonina is known only from its type locality on the south-east slopes of Signal Hill (also known as Lion's Hill) on the Cape Peninsula of South Africa. It was found under stones in ravines among fynbos.

== Description ==
Peripatopsis leonina is greenish-black to black with five longitudinal dark stripes above and pink below. The dorsal papillae are orange with black centres, creating a speckled appearance, while the ventral papillae are typically dark green. This species has 20 to 24 pairs of legs, usually 21 or 22 leg pairs, with the last pair of legs reduced. Females of this species measure 7–41 mm (0.28–1.61 in) long and 2–4 mm (0.079–0.157 in) wide, with males measuring 7–34 mm (0.28–1.34 in) long and 2–2.8 mm (0.079–0.110 in) wide.

== Conservation ==
Peripatopsis leonina was listed as extinct by the International Union for the Conservation of Nature in 1996, but was reassessed as critically endangered in 2003 on the basis that its extinction has not been conclusively confirmed. P. leonina was recorded only from the type locality, which has undergone significant residential and agricultural development. It has not been recorded since 1912, and could not be located in a 2009 survey of South African Peripatopsis. It is likely to have declined due to habitat fragmentation, habitat degradation, and air pollution.
