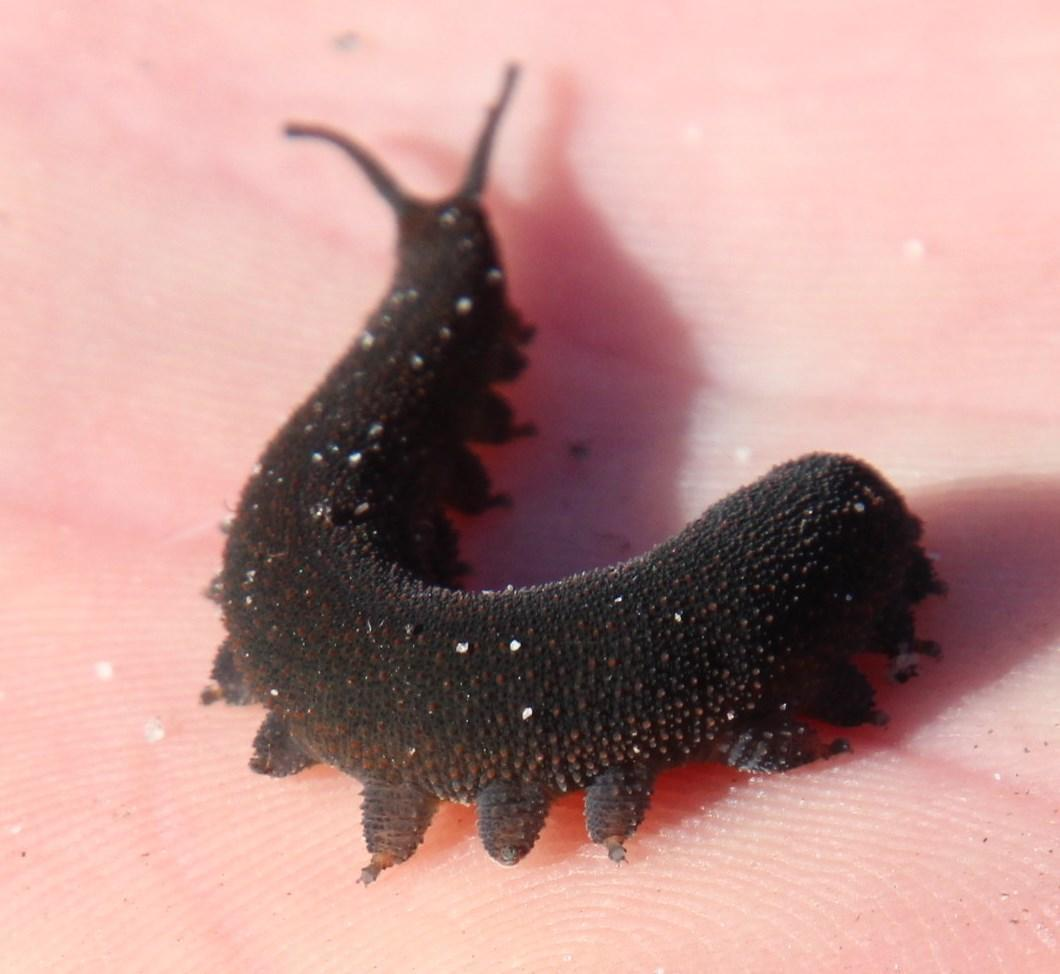
- Peripatopsis capensis

Scientific classification
- Kingdom: Animalia
- Phylum: Onychophora
- Family: Peripatopsidae
- Genus: Peripatopsis; Pocock, 1894

Species
- See text

= Peripatopsis =

Genus of basal Peripatopsid velvet worms

Peripatopsis is a genus of velvet worms in the Peripatopsidae family. These velvet worms are found in the KwaZulu-Natal, Western Cape, and Eastern Cape provinces of South Africa. This genus was proposed by the British zoologist Reginald I. Pocock in 1894 with Peripatopsis capensis designated as the type species.

== Description ==
The number of legs in this genus ranges from as few as 16 pairs (e.g., in P. clavigera) to as many as 25 pairs (in P. moseleyi) and can vary within species. Velvet worms in this genus feature a last pair of legs (the genital pair) that is rudimentary or reduced in size, mainly in males. The feet in this genus feature three distal papillae: two anterior and one posterior. The gonopore in the male is cross-shaped but in the female takes the form of a longitudinal slit.

== Reproduction ==
This genus exhibits matrotrophic viviparity, that is, mothers in this genus retain eggs in their uteri and supply nourishment to their embryos, but without any placenta. Eggs are fertilized through dermal insemination. Males place spermatophores on the skin of females, which allows the entry of sperm at the point of contact. Embryonic development in this genus takes 12 to 13 months, during which the mother contains up to 20 embryos, all at about the same stage of development. The young are born alive tail first, one or two at a time, all within a short period of time. The young resemble adults in form but are smaller.

== Species ==
The genus Peripatopsis consists of the following species:

- Peripatopsis aereus Daniels & Nieto Lawrence, 2024
- Peripatopsis alba Lawrence, 1931 — white cave velvet worm
- Peripatopsis balfouri (Sedgwick, 1885); type species
- Peripatopsis barnardi Daniels & Barnes, 2025
- Peripatopsis birgeri Ruhberg & Daniels, 2013
- Peripatopsis bolandi Daniels, McDonald & Picker, 2013
- Peripatopsis capensis (Grube, 1866)
- Peripatopsis cederbergiensis Daniels, McDonald & Picker, 2013
- Peripatopsis clavigera Purcell, 1899 — Knysna velvet worm
- Peripatopsis collarium Barnes & Daniels, 2024
- Peripatopsis edenensis Barnes, Reiss & Daniels, 2020
- Peripatopsis fernkloofi Daniels & Barnes, 2025
- Peripatopsis ferox Barnes, Reiss & Daniels, 2020
- Peripatopsis hamerae Ruhberg & Daniels, 2013
- Peripatopsis intermedia Hutchinson, 1928
- Peripatopsis janni Ruhberg & Daniels, 2013
- Peripatopsis jonkershoeki Daniels & Barnes, 2025
- Peripatopsis kogelbergi Daniels & Barnes, 2025
- Peripatopsis landroskoppie Daniels & Barnes, 2025
- Peripatopsis lawrencei McDonald, Ruhberg & Daniels, 2012
- Peripatopsis leonina Purcell, 1899 — Lion's Hill velvet worm
- Peripatopsis limietbergi Daniels & Barnes, 2025
- Peripatopsis margaritarius Barnes & Daniels, 2024
- Peripatopsis mellaria Barnes, Reiss & Daniels, 2020
- Peripatopsis mira Barnes, Reiss & Daniels, 2020
- Peripatopsis moseleyi (Wood-Mason, 1879)
- Peripatopsis orientalis Barnes & Daniels, 2024
- Peripatopsis overbergiensis McDonald, Ruhberg & Daniels, 2012 — Overberg velvet worm
- Peripatopsis palmeri Daniels & Barnes, 2025
- Peripatopsis polychroma Grobler, Myburgh, Barnes & Daniels, 2023
- Peripatopsis purpureus Daniels, McDonald & Picker, 2013
- Peripatopsis sedgwicki Purcell, 1899 — Tsitsikamma velvet worm
- Peripatopsis storchi Ruhberg & Daniels, 2013
- Peripatopsis tulbaghensis Barnes, Reiss & Daniels, 2020
