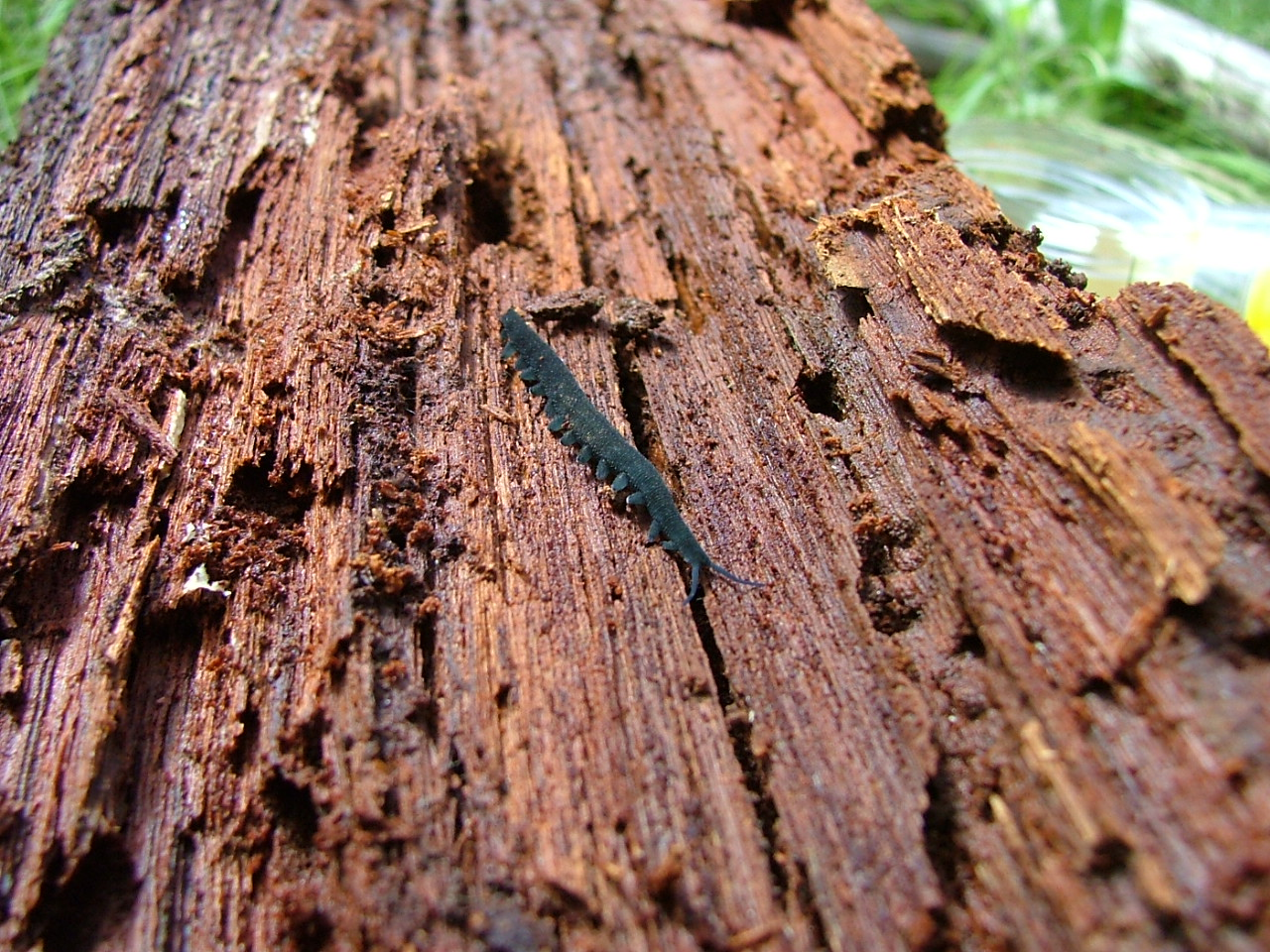
- On a eucalyptus log in which it normally resides in Australia

Scientific classification
- Kingdom: Animalia
- Phylum: Onychophora
- Family: Peripatopsidae
- Genus: Euperipatoides
- Species: E. kanangrensis

Binomial name
- Euperipatoides kanangrensis (Reid, 1996)

= Euperipatoides kanangrensis =

Species of Peripatopsid velvet worm

Euperipatoides kanangrensis is a species of velvet worm of the family Peripatopsidae, described in 1996 from specimens collected in Kanangra-Boyd National Park, New South Wales. This species has 15 pairs of legs in both sexes. It is endemic to Australia. The embryonic development of Euperipatoides kanangrensis has been described. This species is viviparous. This species is used as model organism for the last common ancestor of the Panarthropoda. It resembles fossil Cambrian lobopodians.
