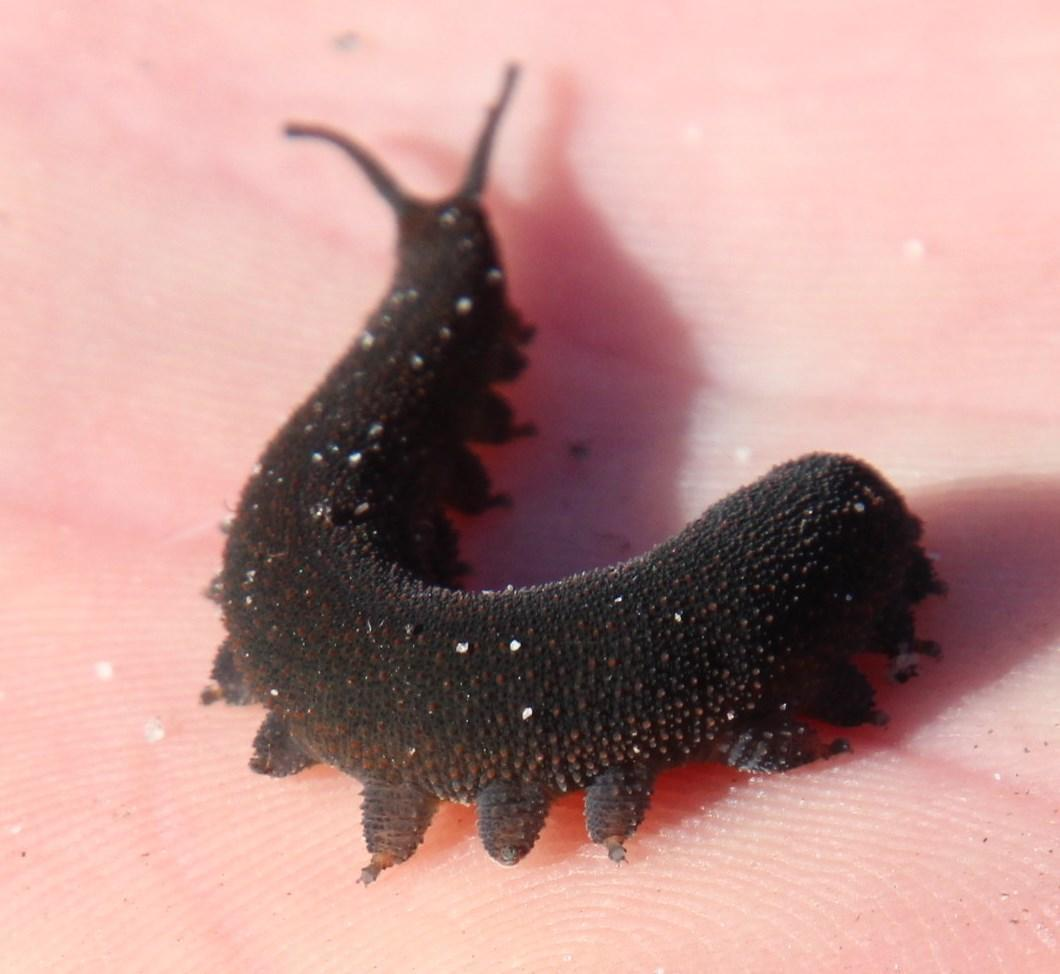

Scientific classification
- Kingdom: Animalia
- Phylum: Onychophora
- Family: Peripatopsidae
- Genus: Peripatopsis
- Species: P. capensis

Binomial name
- Peripatopsis capensis (Grube, 1866)

Synonyms
- Peripatus capensis (Grube, 1866)

= Peripatopsis capensis =

Species of velvet worm

Peripatopsis capensis is a species of velvet worm in the Peripatopsidae family. This species has 18 pairs of legs: 17 pregenital leg pairs with claws plus one strongly reduced last pair without claws or spinous pads. Females of this species range from 9 mm to 70 mm in length, whereas males range from 6 mm to 54 mm. The native range of this species is limited to the Cape Peninsula of South Africa.

== Introduced distribution ==
Outside of its native range in South Africa, this species has also been found on Santa Cruz Island in the Galapagos Islands, thought to be an accidental human-mediated introduction. Santa Cruz Island also has one or more native species of velvet worms in the family Peripatidae.

== Gallery ==
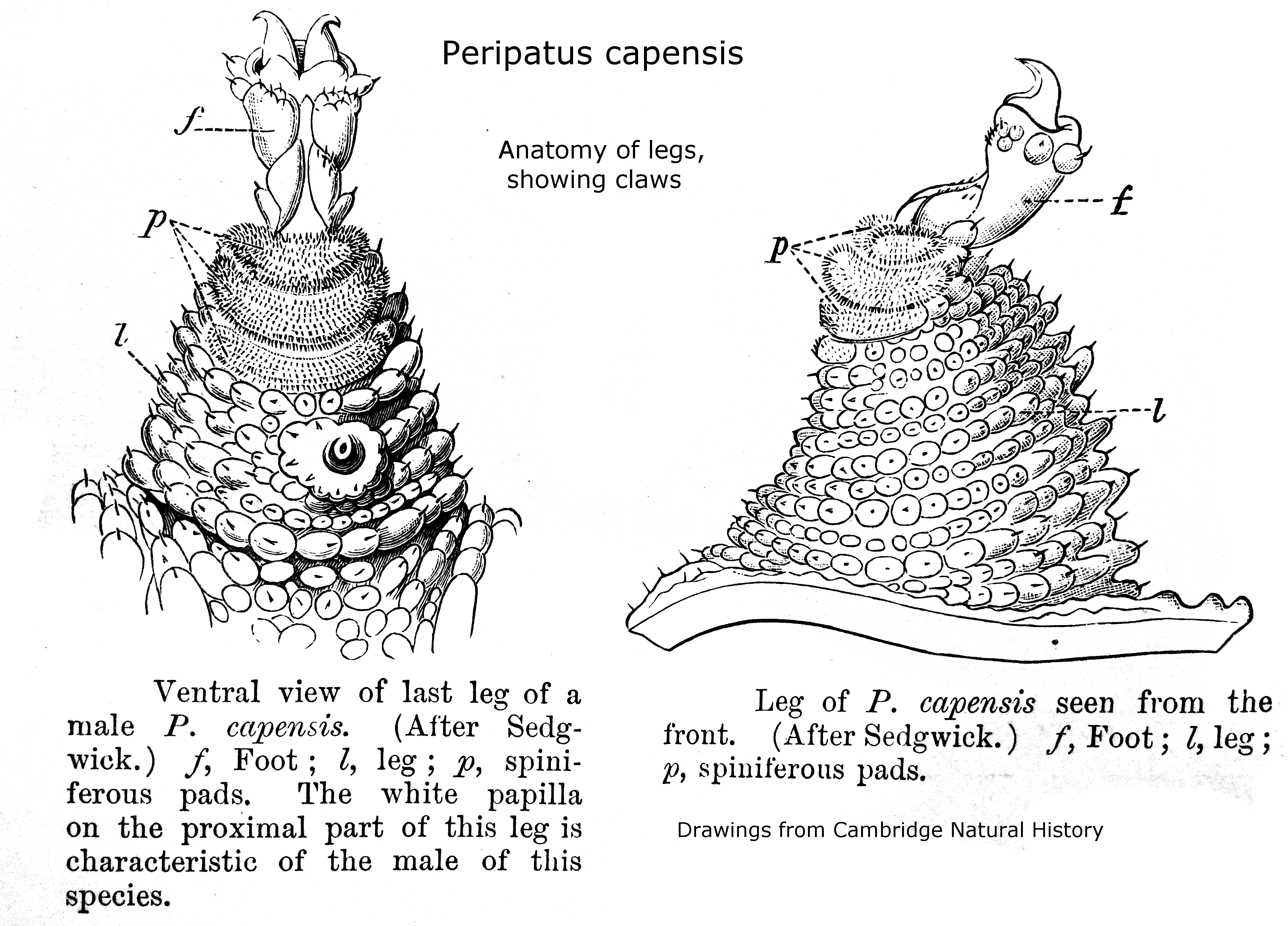
Illustration of leg anatomy of Peripatopsis capensis, including claws
