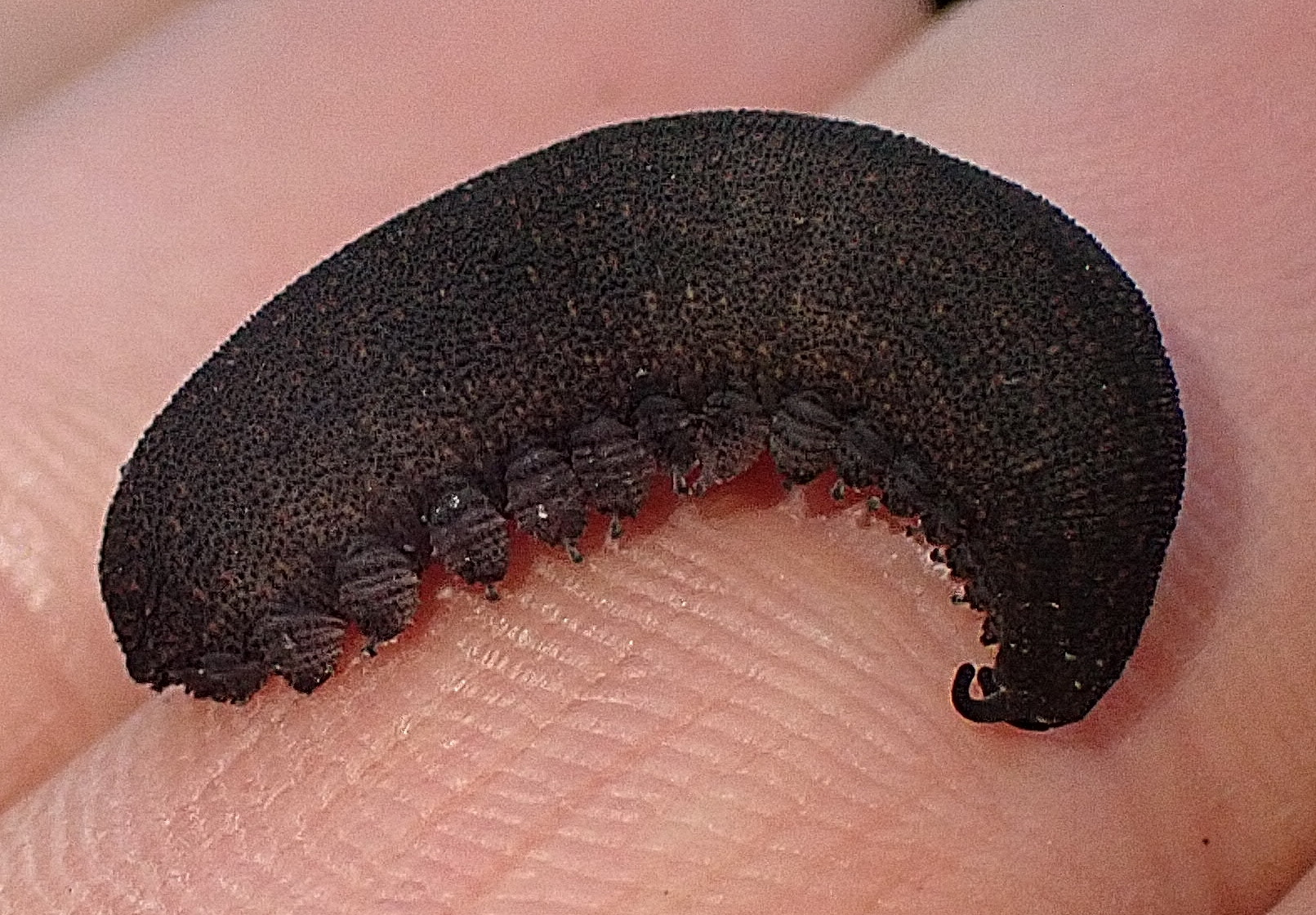

Conservation status
- Vulnerable (IUCN 3.1)

Scientific classification
- Kingdom: Animalia
- Phylum: Onychophora
- Family: Peripatopsidae
- Genus: Peripatopsis
- Species: P. clavigera

Binomial name
- Peripatopsis clavigera Purcell, 1899

= Peripatopsis clavigera =

Species of velvet worm

Peripatopsis clavigera, the Knysna velvet worm, is a species of velvet worm in the Peripatopsidae family. This species has 16 pairs of legs and ranges from 4 mm to 17 mm in length. Peripatopsis clavigera is found in subtropical or tropical moist montane forests of the Diepwalle Nature Reserve in South Africa.

== Conservation ==
Peripatopsis clavigera is threatened by habitat loss. It is listed as Vulnerable on the IUCN Red List.
