= Peripatopsis balfouri =

Scientific classification
- Kingdom: Animalia
- Phylum: Onychophora
- Family: Peripatopsidae
- Genus: Peripatopsis
- Species: P. balfouri

Binomial name
- Peripatopsis balfouri (Sedgwick, 1885)

Synonyms
- Peripatus balfouri (Sedgwick, 1885); Peripatopsis stelliporata Sherbon & Walker, 2004

Species of velvet worm

Peripatopsis balfouri is a species of velvet worm in the Peripatopsidae family. This velvet worm is found in South Africa. This species usually has 18 pairs of clawed legs (with the last pair more reduced in the male than in the female), but in the vicinity of Newlands in the Western Cape province, the leg number ranges from 17 to 19 pairs. Also known as the blue velvet worm, this species ranges from 9 mm to 22 mm in length.
