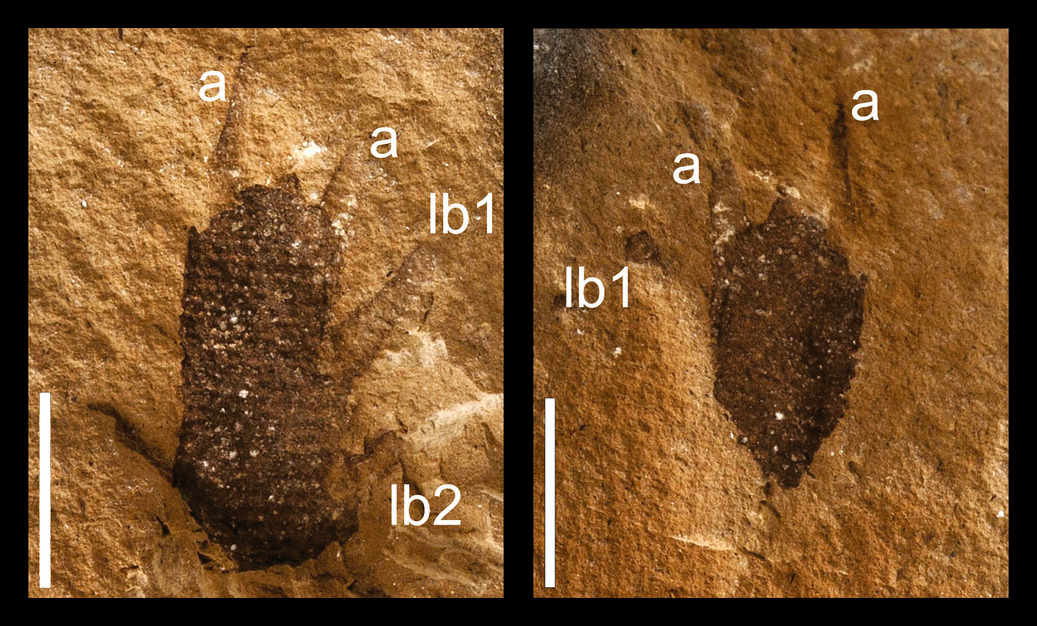
- Antennipatus montceauensis, an extinct velvet worm from France

Scientific classification
- Kingdom: Animalia
- Subkingdom: Eumetazoa
- Clade: ParaHoxozoa
- Clade: Bilateria
- Clade: Nephrozoa
- Clade: Protostomia
- Superphylum: Ecdysozoa
- Clade: Panarthropoda
- Phylum: Onychophora; Grube, 1850

Families and genera
- †Antennacanthopodia; †Helenodora?; †Tritonychus?; Crown group; Peripatidae; Peripatopsidae; †Antennipatus; †Tertiapatus?; †Succinipatopsis?

= Onychophora =

Onychophora Temporal range: Late Carboniferous–Recent stem group from Cambrian
- Peripatoides novaezealandiae (Peripatopsidae)

Phylum of invertebrate animals

Onychophora /ɒnɪˈkɒfərə/ (from Ancient Greek: ονυχής, onyches, "claws"; and φέρειν, pherein, "to carry"), commonly known as velvet worms (for their velvety texture and somewhat worm-like appearance), is a phylum of long, soft-bodied, many-legged animals. In appearance, they have variously been compared to worms with legs, caterpillars, and slugs. All living onychophorans prey upon other invertebrates, which they catch by ejecting an adhesive slime. Approximately 232 species of velvet worms have been described, although the true number is likely to be much greater.

The two extant families of velvet worms are Peripatidae and Peripatopsidae. They show a peculiar distribution, with the peripatids being predominantly equatorial and tropical, while the peripatopsids are all found south of the equator. Onychophora is the only phylum of animal that is wholly endemic to terrestrial environments, at least among extant members. Velvet worms are considered close relatives of arthropods and tardigrades, with which they form the clade Panarthropoda. This makes them of paleontological interest, as they can help reconstruct the ancestral arthropod body plan. Only three fossil species are confidently assigned as onychophorans or close relatives: Antennacanthopodia from the Early Cambrian, Antennipatus from the Late Carboniferous, and Cretoperipatus from the Late Cretaceous (the latter belonging to Peripatidae). In modern zoology, velvet worms are known for their mating behaviors, and in some species, bearing live young.

== Anatomy and physiology ==
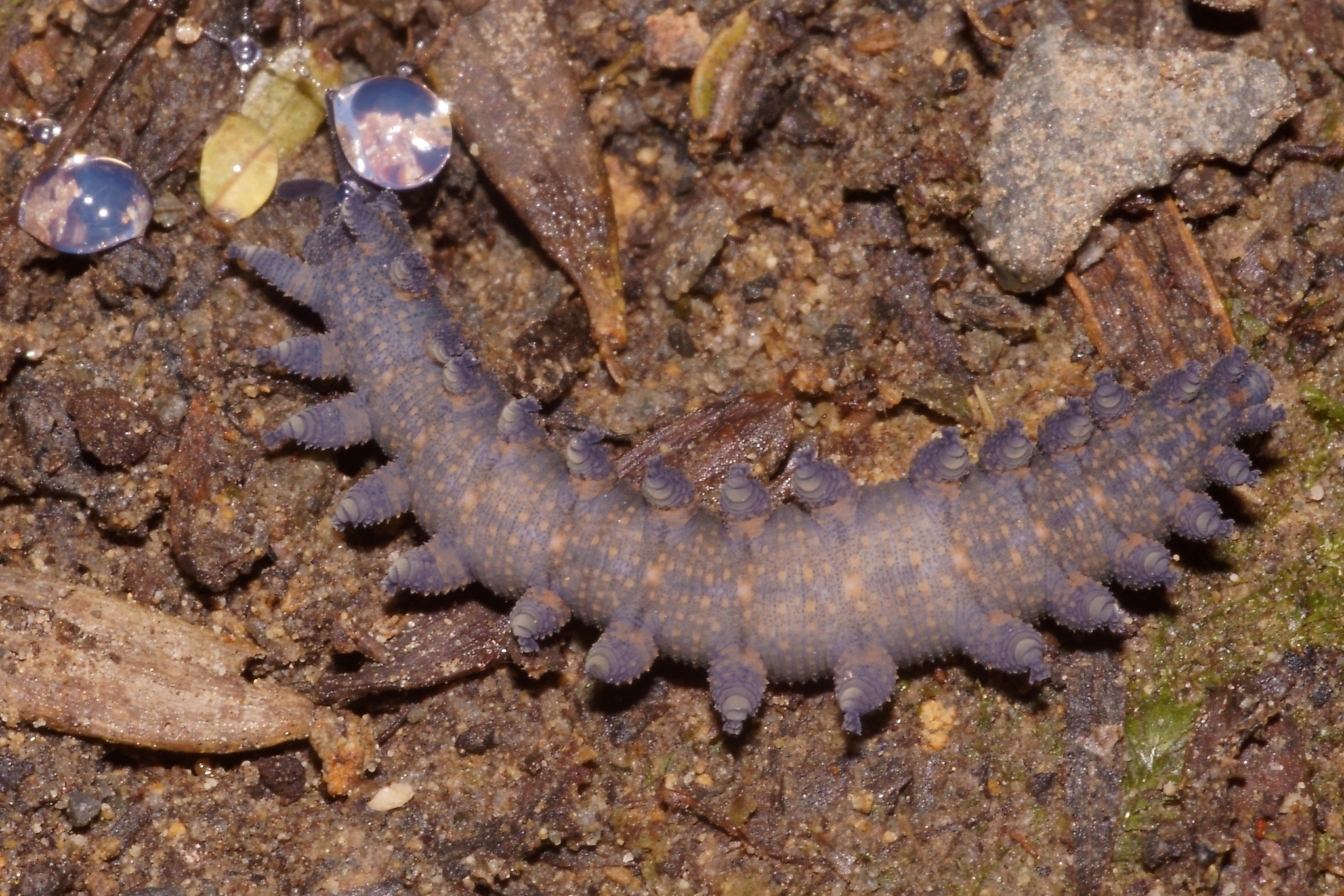
Peripatoides novaezealandiae flipped upside down

Velvet worms are segmented animals with a flattened cylindrical body cross-section and rows of unstructured body appendages known as oncopods or lobopods ("stub feet"). They reach lengths between 0.1 and 22 cm (0.04–8.66 in) depending on species, with the smallest known being Ooperipatellus nanus and the largest known Mongeperipatus solorzanoi. The number of leg pairs ranges from as few as 13 (in Ooperipatellus nanus) to as many as 43 (in Plicatoperipatus jamaicensis).

Their skin consists of numerous, fine transverse rings and is often inconspicuously colored orange, red or brown, but sometimes also bright green, blue, gold or white, and occasionally patterned with other colors. Segmentation is outwardly inconspicuous, and identifiable by the regular spacing of the pairs of legs and in the regular arrangement of skin pores, excretion organs and concentrations of nerve cells. The individual body sections are largely unspecialized; even the head develops only a little differently from the abdominal segments. Segmentation is apparently specified by the same gene as in other groups of animals, and is activated in each case, during embryonic development, at the rear border of each segment and in the growth zone of the stub feet. Although onychophorans fall within the protostome group, their early development has a deuterostome trajectory (with the mouth and anus forming separately); this trajectory is concealed by the rather sophisticated processes which occur in early development.

=== Antennae ===
On the first head segment is a pair of slender antennae, which serve in sensory perception. They probably do not correspond directly to the antennae of the arthropods, but perhaps rather with their "lips" or labrum. At their base is a pair of simple eyes, except in a few blind species. In front of these, in many Australian species, are various dimples, whose function is not yet clear. It appears that in at least some species, these serve in the transfer of sperm-cell packages (spermatophores).

=== Mouth and jaws ===
On the belly side of the second head segment is the labrum, a mouth opening surrounded by sensitive "lips". In the velvet worms, this structure is a muscular outgrowth of the throat, so, despite its name, it is probably not homologous to the labrum of arthropods and is used for feeding. Deep within the oral cavity lie the sharp, crescent-shaped "jaws", or mandibles, which are strongly hardened and resemble the claws of the feet, with which they are serially homologous; early in development, the jaw appendages have a position and shape similar to the subsequent legs. The jaws are divided into internal and external mandibles and their concave surface bears fine denticles. They move backward and forward in a longitudinal direction, tearing apart the prey, apparently moved in one direction by musculature and the other by hydrostatic pressure. The claws are made of sclerotised α-chitin, reinforced with phenols and quinones, and have a uniform composition, except that there is a higher concentration of calcium towards the tip, presumably affording greater strength.

The surface of the mandibles is smooth, with no ornamentation. The cuticle in the mandibles (and claws) is distinct from the rest of the body. It has an inner and outer component; the outer component has just two layers (whereas body cuticle has four), and these outer layers (in particular the inner epicuticle) are dehydrated and strongly tanned, affording toughness.

=== Slime papillae ===
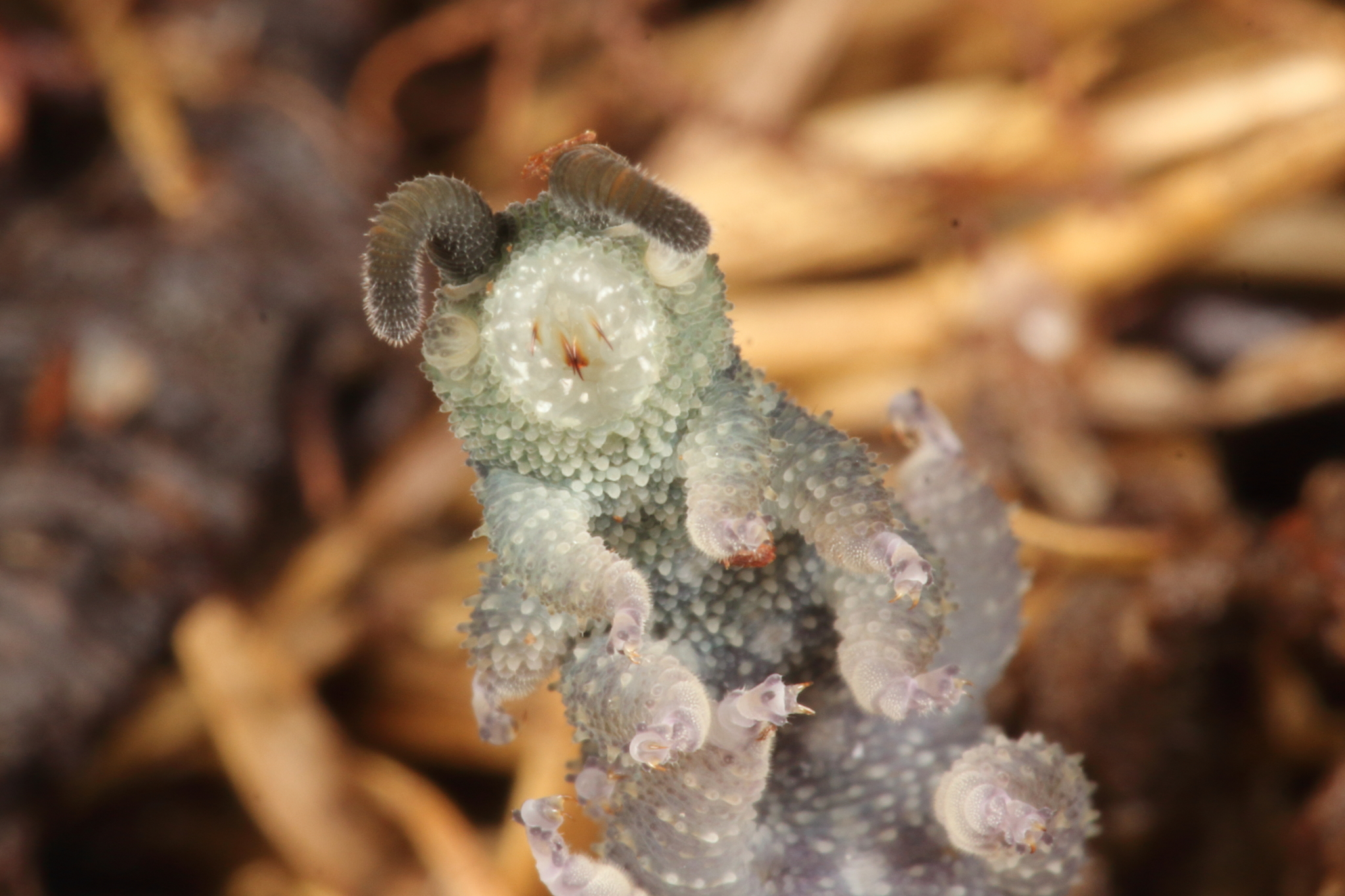
Head region of Ooperipatellus viridimaculatus, showing its oral papillae and mouthparts

On the third head segment, to the left and right of the mouth, are two openings called "oral papillae", with each containing a large, heavily branched slime gland. These slime glands lie roughly in the center of a velvet worm's body and secrete a sort of milky-white slime. The slime is used to both ensnare prey and act as a distraction for defensive purposes. In certain species, an organ connected to the slime gland known as the "slime conductor" is broadened into a reservoir, allowing it to hold pre-produced slime.

Velvet worm slime glands and oral papilla are likely modified and repurposed limbs. The glands themselves are probably modified crural glands. All three structures correspond to an evolutionary origin in the leg pairs of the other segments.

==== Slime ====
Peripatopsis overbergiensis squirting its slime

The Onychophora forcefully squirt glue-like slime (Note: The secretion ejected by onychophorans is sometimes referred to as glue, but termed slime in current scientific literature; e.g. Benkendorff et al. (1999), Baer & Mayer (2012), Concha et al. (2014), and others.) from their oral papillae; they do so either in defense against predators or to capture prey. The openings of the glands that produce the slime are in the papillae, a pair of highly modified limbs on the sides of the head below the antennae. Inside, they have a syringe-like system that, by a geometric amplifier, allows for fast squirt using slow muscular contraction. High speed films show the animal expelling two streams of adhesive liquid through a small opening (50–200 microns) at a speed of 3 to 5 m/s (10 to 20 ft/s). The interplay between the elasticity of oral papillae and the fast unsteady flow produces a passive oscillatory motion (30–60 Hz) of the oral papillae. The oscillation causes the streams to cross in mid air, weaving a disordered net; the velvet worms can control only the general direction where the net is thrown.

The slime glands themselves are deep inside the body cavity, each at the end of a tube more than half the length of the body. The tube both conducts the fluid and stores it until it is required. The distance that the animal can propel the slime varies; usually it squirts it about a centimeter, but the maximal range has variously been reported to be ten centimeters, or even nearly a foot, although accuracy drops with range. It is not clear to what extent the range varies with the species and other factors. One squirt usually suffices to snare a prey item, although larger prey may be further immobilized by smaller squirts targeted at the limbs; additionally, the fangs of spiders are sometimes targeted. Upon ejection, it forms a net of threads about twenty microns in diameter, with evenly spaced droplets of viscous adhesive fluid along their length. It subsequently dries, shrinking, losing its stickiness, and becoming brittle. Onychophora eat their dried slime when they can, which seems provident, since an onychophoran requires about 24 days to replenish an exhausted slime repository.

The slime can account for up to 11% of the organism's dry weight and is 90% water; its dry residue consists mainly of proteins—primarily a collagen-type protein. 1.3% of the slime's dry weight consists of sugars, mainly galactosamine. The slime also contains lipids and the surfactant nonylphenol. Onychophora are the only organisms known to produce this latter substance. It tastes "slightly bitter and at the same time somewhat astringent". The proteinaceous composition accounts for the slime's high tensile strength and stretchiness. The lipid and nonylphenol constituents may serve one of two purposes: They may line the ejection channel, stopping the slime from sticking to the organism when it is secreted; or they may slow the drying process long enough for the slime to reach its target.

=== Lobopods ===
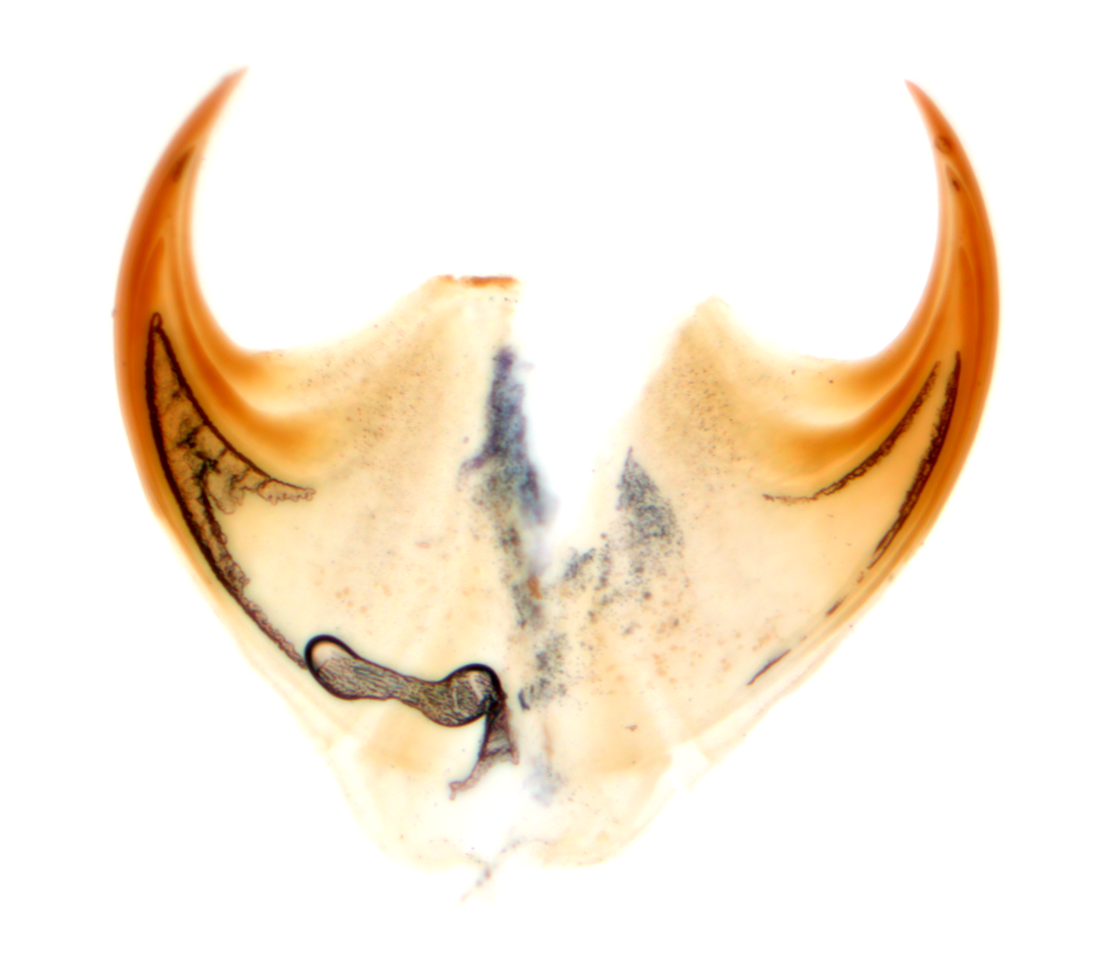
A pair of claws from Euperipatoides kanangrensis

The stub feet that characterize the velvet worms are conical, baggy appendages of the body, which are internally hollow and have no joints. Although the number of feet can vary considerably between species, their structure is basically very similar. Rigidity is provided by the hydrostatic pressure of their fluid contents, and movement is usually obtained passively by stretching and contraction of the animal's entire body. However, each leg can also be shortened and bent by internal muscles. Due to the lack of joints, this bending can take place at any point along the sides of the leg. In some species, two different organs are found within the feet:

- Crural glands are situated at the shoulder of the legs, extending into the body cavity. They open outwards at the crural papillae—small wart-like bumps on the belly side of the leg—and secrete chemical messenger materials called pheromones. Their name comes from the Latin cruralis meaning "of the legs".
- Coxal vesicles are pouches located on the belly side of the leg, which can be everted and probably serve in water absorption. They belong to the family Peripatidae and are named from coxa, the Latin word for "hip".

On each foot is a pair of retractable, hardened (sclerotised) chitin claws, which give the taxon its scientific name: Onychophora is derived from the Ancient Greek: ονυχής, onyches, "claws"; and φέρειν, pherein, "to carry". At the base of the claws are three to six spiny "cushions" on which the leg sits in its resting position and on which the animal walks over smooth substrates. The claws are used mainly to gain a firm foothold on uneven terrain. Each claw is composed of three stacked elements, like Russian nesting dolls. The outermost is shed during ecdysis, which exposes the next element, which is fully formed and so does not need time to harden before it is used. This distinctive construction identifies many early Cambrian fossils as early offshoots of the onychophoran lineage.

=== Skin and muscle ===
Unlike the arthropods, velvet worms do not possess a rigid exoskeleton. Instead, their fluid-filled body cavity acts as a hydrostatic skeleton, similarly to many distantly related soft-bodied animals that are cylindrically shaped, for example sea anemones and various worms. Pressure of their (near-incompressible) internal bodily fluid on the body wall provides rigidity, and muscles are able to act against it. The body wall consists of a non-cellular outer skin, the cuticula; a single layer of epidermis cells forming an internal skin; and beneath this, usually three layers of muscle, which are embedded in connective tissues. The cuticula is about a micrometer thick and covered with fine villi. In composition and structure, it resembles the cuticula of the arthropods, consisting of α-chitin and various proteins, although not containing collagen. It can be divided into an external epicuticula and an internal procuticula, which themselves consist of exo- and endo-cuticula. This multi-level structure is responsible for the high flexibility of the outer skin, which enables the velvet worm to squeeze itself into the narrowest crevices. Although outwardly water-repellent, the cuticula is not able to prevent water loss by respiration, and, as a result, velvet worms can live only in micro-climates with high humidity to avoid desiccation. The surface of the cuticula is scattered with numerous fine papilla, the larger of which carry visible villi-like sensitive bristles. The papillae themselves are covered with tiny scales, lending the skin a velvety appearance (from which the common name is likely derived). It also feels like dry velvet to the touch, for which its water-repellent nature is responsible. Moulting of the skin (ecdysis) takes place regularly, around every 14 days, induced by the hormone ecdysone. The inner surface of the skin bears a hexagonal pattern. At each moult, the shed skin is replaced by the epidermis, which lies immediately beneath it; unlike the cuticula, this consists of living cells. Beneath this lies a thick layer of connective tissue, which is composed primarily of collagen fibers aligned either parallel or perpendicular to the body's longitudinal axis. The coloration of Onychophora is generated by a range of pigments. The solubility of these pigments is a useful diagnostic character: in all arthropods and tardigrades, the body pigment is soluble in ethanol. This is also true for the Peripatidae, but in the case of the Peripatopsidae, the body pigment is insoluble in ethanol.

Within the connective tissue lie three continuous layers of unspecialized smooth muscular tissue. The relatively thick outer layer is composed of annular muscles, and the similarly voluminous inner layer of longitudinal muscles. Between them lie thin diagonal muscles that wind backward and forward along the body axis in a spiral. Between the annular and diagonal muscles exist fine blood vessels, which lie below the superficially recognizable transverse rings of the skin and are responsible for the pseudo-segmented markings. Beneath the internal muscle layer lies the body cavity. In cross-section, this is divided into three regions by so-called dorso-ventral muscles, which run from the middle of the underbelly through to the edges of the upper side: a central midsection and on the left and right, two side regions that also include the legs.

=== Nervous system ===
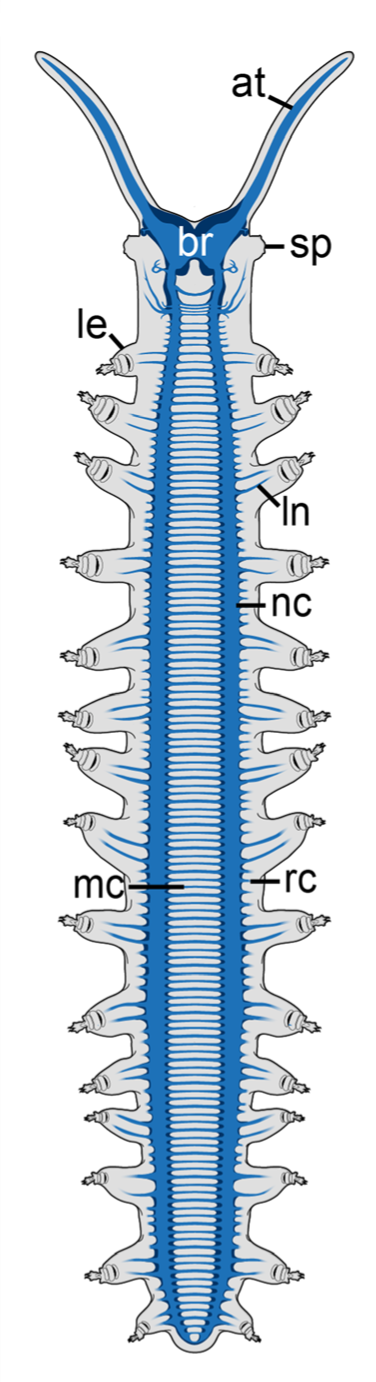
Drawing of the ladder-like nervous system

The entire body, including the stub feet, is littered with numerous papillae: warty protrusions responsive to touch that carry a mechanoreceptive bristle at the tip, each of which is also connected to further sensory nerve cells lying beneath. The mouth papillae, the exits of the slime glands, probably also have some function in sensory perception. Sensory cells known as "sensills" on the "lips" or labrum respond to chemical stimuli and are known as chemoreceptors. These are also found on the two antennae, which seem to be the velvet worm's most important sensory organs.

==== Eyes ====
Except for a few blind (and often cave-dwelling) species, velvet worms have two eyes known as ocelli. These are located on top of the head, behind the antenna, and are positioned slightly to the side. Their exact size varies between species, but generally, the eyes are quite small. Onychophoran eyes have an irregular cup-shape and are composed of a cornea, lens, and retina. For those that have them, each eye is connected to the center of the brain via an optic nerve. The retina comprises numerous pigment cells and photoreceptors; the latter are easily modified flagellated cells, whose flagellum membranes carry a photosensitive pigment on their surface. Additionally, almost all of the eye is encased in a layer of connective tissue. Onychophoran eyes are thought to be homologous with the ocelli of arthropods. This suggests that their last common ancestor may have only had ocelli, with the arthropod line developing compound eyes sometime later.

=== Circulation ===
The body cavity is known as a "pseudocoel", or haemocoel. Unlike a true coelom, a pseudocoel is not fully enclosed by a cell layer derived from the embryonic mesoderm. A coelom is, however, formed around the gonads and the waste-eliminating nephridia. As the name haemocoel suggests, the body cavity is filled with a blood-like liquid in which all the organs are embedded; in this way, they can be easily supplied with nutrients circulating in the blood. This liquid is colorless as it does not contain pigments; for this reason, it serves only a limited role in oxygen transport. Two different types of blood cells (or haemocytes) circulate in the fluid: Amoebocytes and nephrocytes. The amoebocytes probably function in protection from bacteria and other foreign bodies; in some species, they also play a role in reproduction. Nephrocytes absorb toxins or convert them into a form suitable for elimination by the nephridia.

The haemocoel is divided by a horizontal partition, the diaphragm, into two parts: The pericardial sinus along the back and the perivisceral sinus along the belly. The former encloses the tube-like heart, and the latter, the other organs. The diaphragm is perforated in many places, enabling the exchange of fluids between the two cavities. The heart itself is a tube of annular muscles consisting of epithelial tissues, with two lateral openings (ostia) per segment. While it is not known whether the rear end is open or closed, from the front, it opens directly into the body cavity.

Since there are no blood vessels, apart from the fine vessels running between the muscle layers of the body wall and a pair of arteries that supply the antennae, this is referred to as an open circulation. The timing of the pumping procedure can be divided into two parts: Diastole and systole. During diastole, blood flows through the ostia from the pericardial sinus (the cavity containing the heart) into the heart. When the systole begins, the ostia close and the heart muscles contract inwards, reducing the volume of the heart. This pumps the blood from the front end of the heart into the perivisceral sinus containing the organs. In this way, the various organs are supplied with nutrients before the blood finally returns to the pericardial sinus via the perforations in the diaphragm. In addition to the pumping action of the heart, body movements also influence circulation.

=== Respiration ===
Oxygen uptake occurs to an extent via simple diffusion through the entire body surface, with the coxal vesicles on the legs possibly being involved in some species. However, of most importance is gas exchange via fine unbranched tubes, the tracheae, which draw oxygen from the surface deep into the various organs, particularly the heart.

The walls of these structures, which are less than three micrometers thick in their entirety, consist only of an extremely thin membrane through which oxygen can easily diffuse. The tracheae originate at tiny openings, the spiracles, which themselves are clustered together in dent-like recesses of the outer skin, the atria. The number of "tracheae bundles" thus formed is on average around 75 bundles per body segment; they accumulate most densely on the back of the organism.

Unlike the arthropods, the velvet worms are unable to control the openings of their tracheae; the tracheae are always open, entailing considerable water loss in arid conditions. Water is lost twice as fast as in earthworms and forty times faster than in caterpillars. For this reason, velvet worms are dependent upon habitats with high air humidity.

Oxygen transport is helped by the oxygen carrier hemocyanin.

=== Digestion and excretion ===
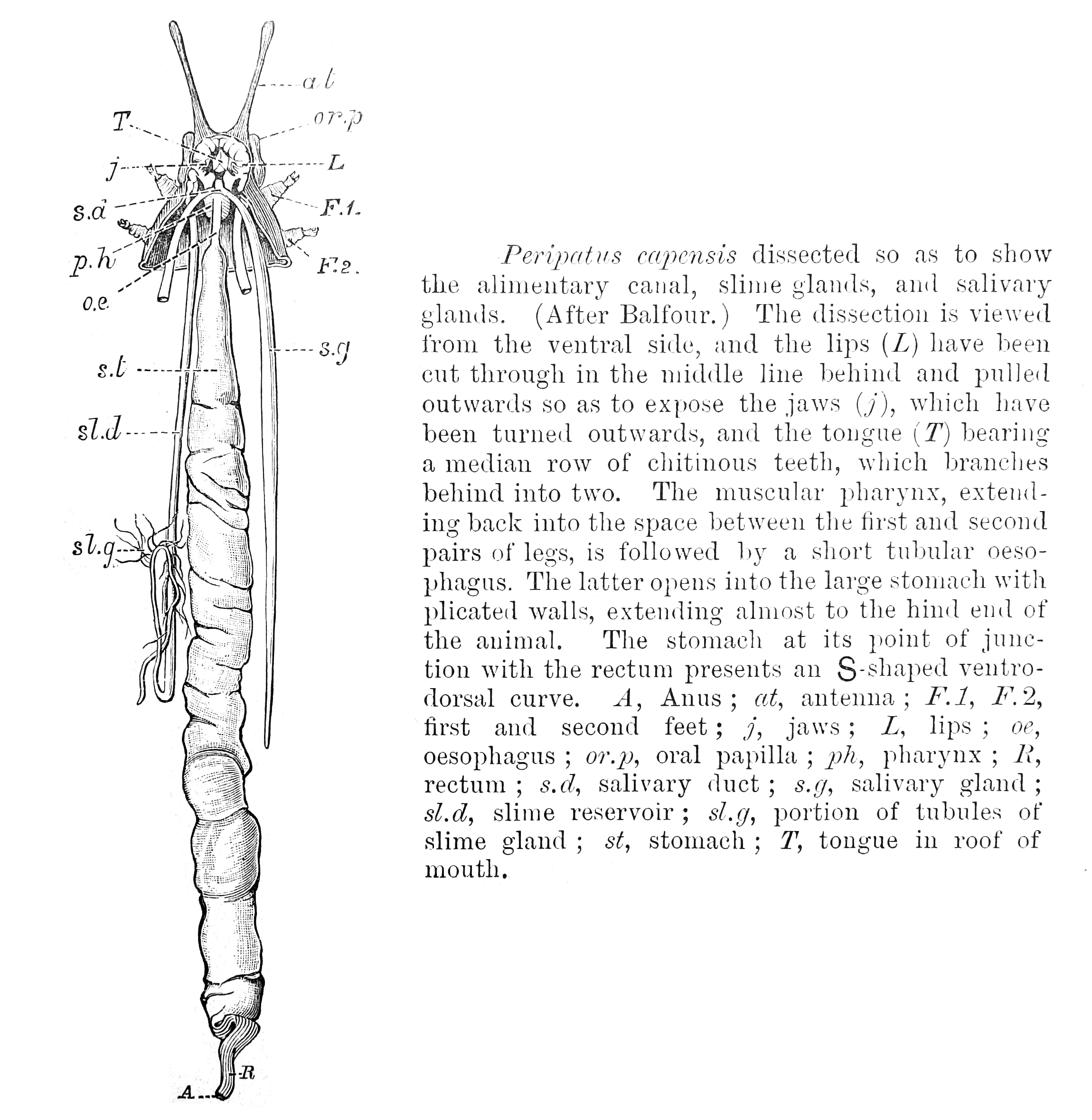
Digestive system of Peripatopsis capensis

The digestive tract begins slightly behind the head, the mouth lying on the underside a little way from the front-most point of the body. Here, prey can be mechanically dismembered by the mandibles with their covering of fine toothlets. Two salivary glands discharge via a common conductor into the subsequent "throat", which makes up the first part of the front intestine. The saliva that they produce contains mucus and hydrolytic enzymes, which initiate digestion in and outside the mouth.

The throat itself is very muscular, serving to absorb the partially liquefied food and to pump it, via the oesophagus, which forms the rear part of the front intestine, into the central intestine. Unlike the front intestine, this is not lined with a cuticula but instead consists only of a single layer of epithelial tissue, which does not exhibit conspicuous indentation as is found in other animals.

On entering the central intestine, food particles are coated with a mucus-based peritrophic membrane, which serves to protect the lining of the intestine from damage by sharp-edged particles. The intestinal epithelium secretes further digestive enzymes and absorbs the released nutrients, although the majority of digestion has already taken place externally or in the mouth. Indigestible remnants arrive in the rear intestine, or rectum, which is once again lined with a cuticula and which opens at the anus, located on the underside near to the rear end.

In almost every segment is a pair of excretory organs called nephridia, which are derived from coelom tissue. Each consists of a small pouch that is connected, via a flagellated conductor called a nephridioduct, to an opening at the base of the nearest leg known as a nephridiopore. The pouch is occupied by special cells called podocytes, which facilitate ultrafiltration of the blood through the partition between haemocoelom and nephridium.

The composition of the urinary solution is modified in the nephridioduct by selective recovery of nutrients and water and by isolation of poison and waste materials, before it is excreted to the outside world via the nephridiopore. The most important nitrogenous excretion product is the water-insoluble uric acid; this can be excreted in solid state, with very little water. This so-called uricotelic excretory mode represents an adjustment to life on land and the associated necessity of dealing economically with water.

A pair of former nephridia in the head were converted secondarily into the salivary glands, while another pair in the final segment of male specimens now serve as glands that apparently play a role in reproduction.

=== Reproductive organs ===
Both sexes possess pairs of gonads, opening via a channel called a gonoduct into a common genital opening, the gonopore, which is located on the rear ventral side. Both the gonads and the gonoduct are derived from true coelom tissue.

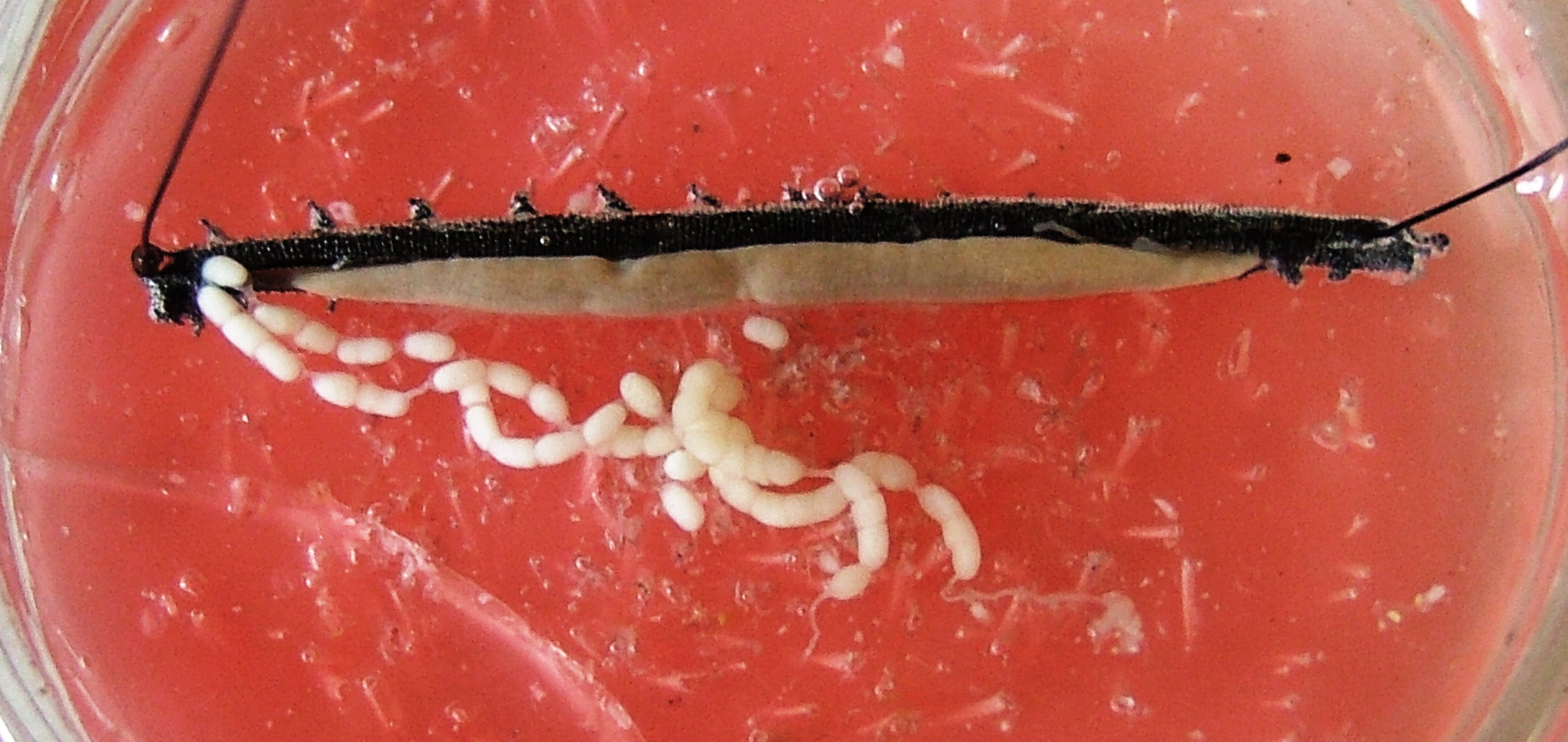
A dissected Euperipatoides kanangrensis. The two ovaries, full of stage II embryos, are floating to the bottom of the image.

In females, the two ovaries are joined in the middle and to the horizontal diaphragm. The gonoduct appears differently depending on whether the species is live-bearing or egg-laying. In live-bearing species, each exit channel divides into a slender oviduct and a roomy "womb", the uterus, in which the embryos develop. The single vagina, to which both uteri are connected, runs outward to the gonopore. In egg-laying species, whose gonoduct is uniformly constructed, the genital opening lies at the tip of a long egg-laying apparatus, the ovipositor. The females of many species also possess a sperm repository called the receptacle seminis, in which sperm cells from males can be stored temporarily or for longer periods.

Males possess two separate testes, along with the corresponding sperm vesicle (the vesicula seminalis) and exit channel (the vasa efferentia). The two vasa efferentia unite to a common sperm duct, the vas deferens, which in turn widens through the ejaculatory channel to open at the gonopore. Directly beside or behind this lie two pairs of special glands, which probably serve some auxiliary reproductive function; the rearmost glands are also known as anal glands. A penis-like structure has so far been found only in males of the genus Paraperipatus but has not yet been observed in action.

There are different mating procedures: in some species males deposit their spermatophore directly into the female's genital opening, while others deposit it on the female's body, where the cuticle will collapse, allowing the sperm cells to migrate into the female. There are also Australian species where the male place their spermatophore on top of their head, which is then pressed against the female's genitals. In these species the head have elaborate structures like spikes, spines, hollow stylets, pits, and depressions, whose purpose is to either hold the sperm and / or assist in the sperm transfer to the female. The males of most species also secrete a pheromone from glands on the underside of the legs to attract females.

== Distribution and habitat ==
=== Distribution ===
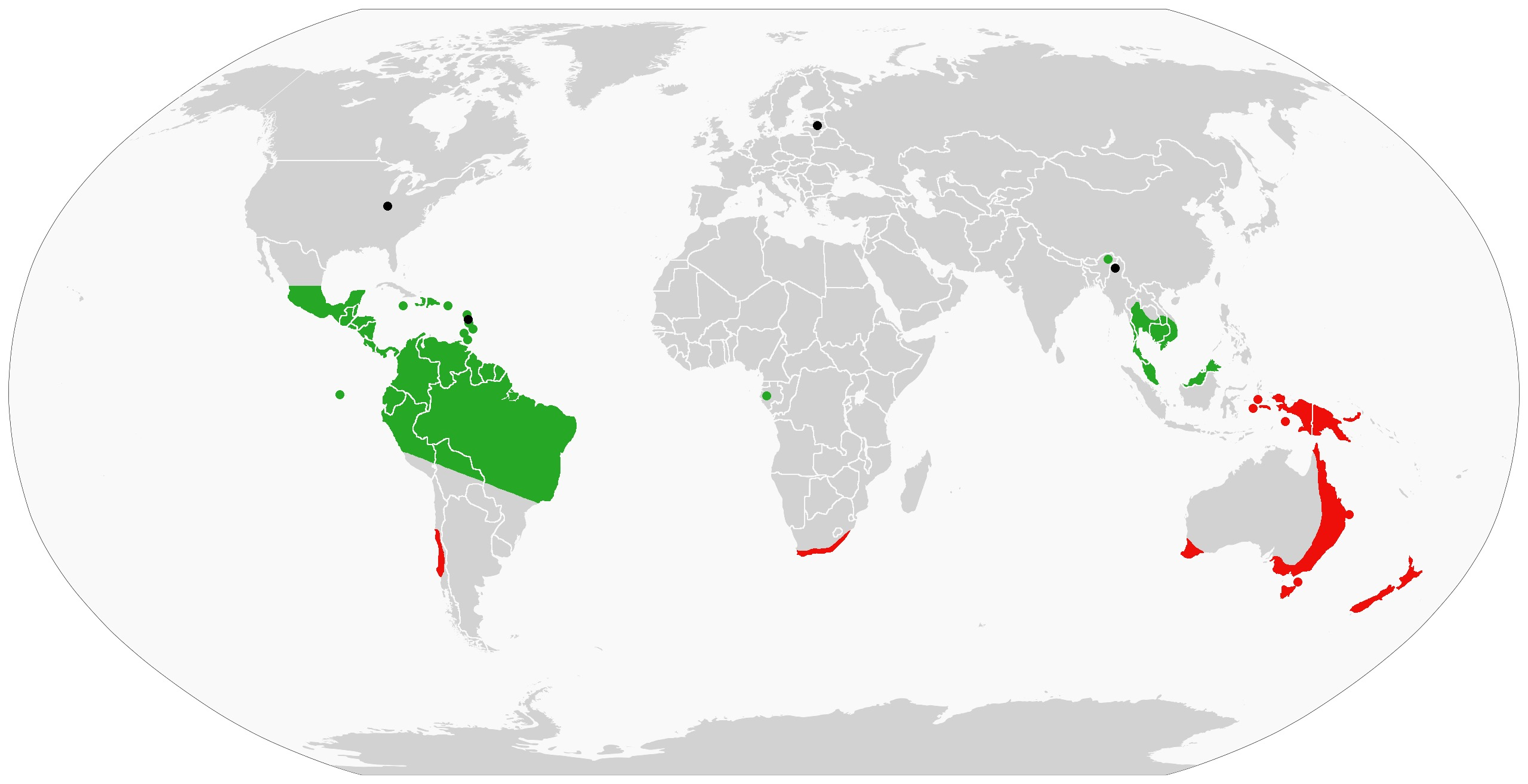
Known distribution of modern and fossil velvet worms. Peripatopsidae (red), Peripatidae (green) and fossils (black)

Velvet worms are found in the tropics and in the temperate zone of the Southern Hemisphere. Members of the family Peripatidae are found in the tropical regions of South America, Central America, the Caribbean islands, Gabon, Northeast India, and Southeast Asia. Meanwhile, members of Peripatopsidae are found in Chile, Australia, Southern Africa, New Guinea, and New Zealand. One deviation is the South African Peripatopsis capensis. This animal was inadvertently introduced to Santa Cruz Island in the Galapagos and co-occurs with native species. When looking at velvet worms as a whole, the majority of are found in Australia and South America.

Extinct onychophorans have been discovered in parts of the Northern Hemisphere which are currently uninhabited by the group. While the onychophoran affinities of Succinipatopsis and Helenodora are questioned, others like the Antennipatus (found in France) are at a minimum close relatives of crown-group Onychophora (Peripatidae and Peripatopsidae). This indicates that velvet worms were far more widespread in the past, but subsequently died off for unknown reasons.

=== Habitat ===
Velvet worms always sparsely occupy the habitats where they are found: they are rare among the fauna of their habitats.

All extant velvet worms are terrestrial, preferring dark, humid environments. They are often found in rain-forests, in micro-habitats such as moss cushions, leaf litter, rotting wood, termite tunnels, soil crevices, and under stones and tree trunks. They also occur in unforested grassland.

Some species live in caves, with at least one species living both on the surface and in caves. Velvet worms are already adapted to life in the dark and in crevices on the surface, so this has been described as an exaptation.

Some species of velvet worms are able to occupy human-modified land-uses, such as cocoa and banana plantations in South America and the Caribbean, but for others, conversion of rain-forests is likely one of the most important threats to their survival. (see Conservation).

Velvet worms are photophobic: They are repelled by bright light sources. Because the danger of desiccation is greatest during the day and in dry weather, velvet worms are usually most active at night and during rainy weather. Under cold or dry conditions, they actively seek out crevices in which they shift their body into a resting state.

== Behavior ==
=== Feeding ===
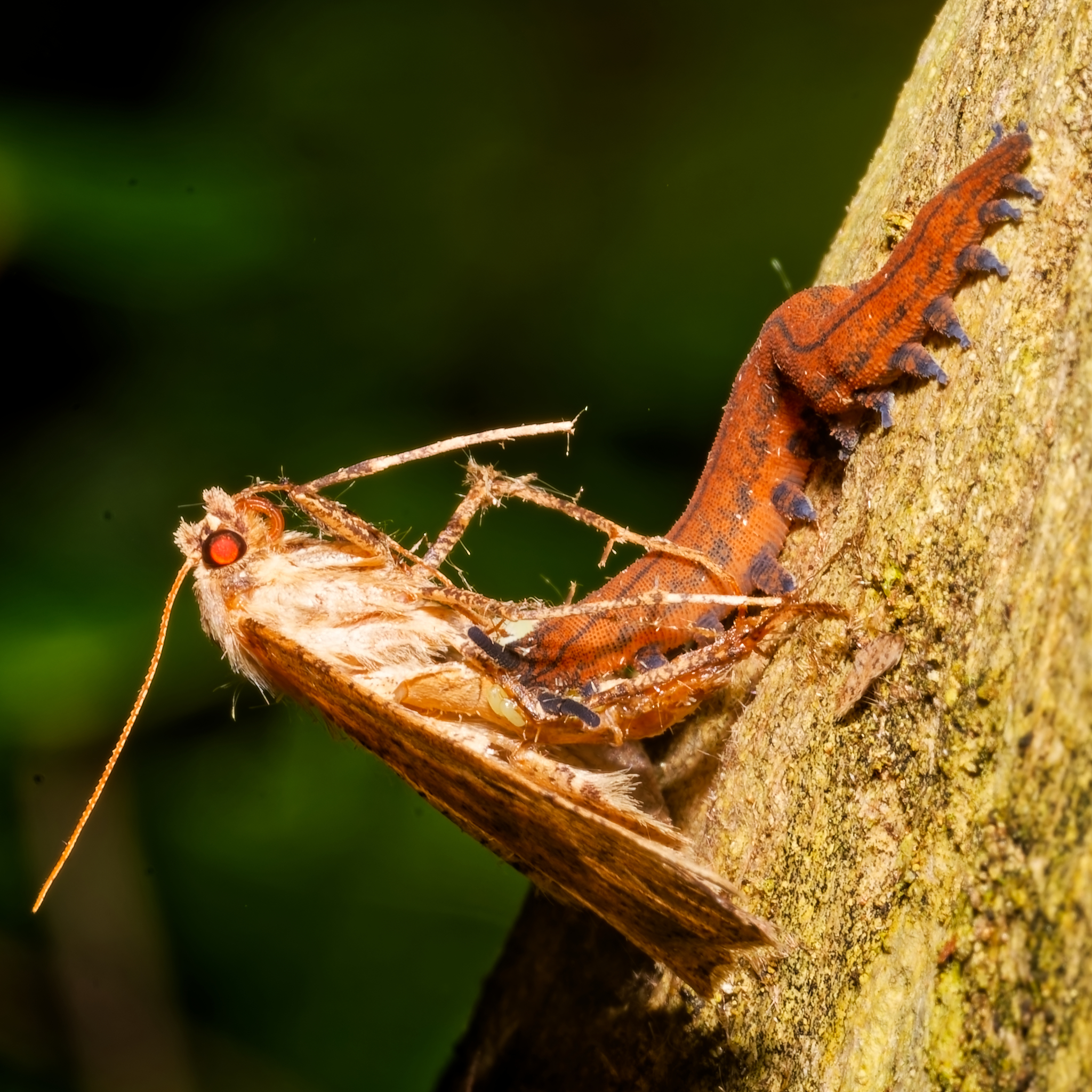
Peripatoides novaezealandiae eating a moth

Velvet worms are ambush predators, hunting only by night, and are able to capture animals at least their own size, although capturing a large prey item may take almost all of their mucus-secreting capacity. They feed on almost any small invertebrates, including woodlice (Isopoda), termites (Isoptera), crickets (Gryllidae), book/bark lice (Psocoptera), cockroaches (Blattidae), millipedes and centipedes (Myriapoda), spiders (Araneae), various worms, and even large snails (Gastropoda). Depending on their size, they eat on average every one to four weeks. They are considered to be ecologically equivalent to centipedes (Chilopoda).

The most energetically favorable prey are two-fifths the size of the hunting onychophoran. Ninety percent of the time involved in eating prey is spent ingesting it; re-ingestion of the slime used to trap the insect is performed while the onychophoran locates a suitable place to puncture the prey, and this phase accounts for around 8% of the feeding time, with the remaining time evenly split between examining, squirting, and injecting the prey. In some cases, chunks of the prey item are bitten off and swallowed; indigestible components take around 18 hours to pass through the digestive tract.

Onychophora probably do not primarily use vision to detect their prey; although their tiny eyes do have a good image-forming capacity, their forward vision is obscured by their antennae; their nocturnal habit also limits the utility of eyesight. Air currents, formed by prey motion, are thought to be the primary mode of locating prey; the role of scent, if any, is unclear. Because it takes so long to ingest a prey item, hunting mainly happens around dusk; the onychophorans will abandon their prey at sunrise.

Unidentified onychophoran feeding on a cockroach

Velvet worms literally creep up on their prey, with their smooth, gradual and fluid movement escaping detection. Once they reach their prey, they touch it very softly with their antennae to assess its size and nutritional value. After each poke, the antenna is hastily retracted to avoid alerting the prey. This investigation may last anywhere upwards of ten seconds, until the velvet worm makes a decision as to whether to attack it, or until it disturbs the prey and the prey flees. Hungry Onychophora spend less time investigating their prey and are quicker to apply their slime. Once slime has been squirted, Onychophora are determined to pursue and devour their prey, in order to recoup the energy investment. They have been observed to spend up to ten minutes searching for removed prey, after which they return to their slime to eat it. In the case of smaller prey, they may opt not to use slime at all. Subsequently, a soft part of the prey item (usually a joint membrane in arthropod prey) is identified, punctured with a bite from the jaws, and injected with saliva. This kills the prey very quickly and begins a slower process of digestion. While the onychophoran waits for the prey to digest, it salivates on its slime and begins to eat it (and anything attached to it). It subsequently tugs and slices at the earlier perforation to allow access to the now-liquefied interior of its prey. The jaws operate by moving backwards and forwards along the axis of the body (not in a side-to-side clipping motion as in arthropods), conceivably using a pairing of musculature and hydrostatic pressure. The pharynx is specially adapted for sucking, to extract the liquefied tissue; the arrangement of the jaws about the tongue and lip papillae ensures a tight seal and the establishment of suction. In social groups, the dominant female is the first to feed, not permitting competitors access to the prey item for the first hour of feeding. Subsequently, subordinate individuals begin to feed. The number of males reaches a peak after females start to leave the prey item. After feeding, individuals clean their antennae and mouth parts before re-joining the rest of their group.

=== Locomotion ===
Peripatoides aurorbis walking

Velvet worms move in a slow and gradual motion that makes them difficult for prey to notice. Their trunk is raised relatively high above the ground, and they walk with non-overlapping steps. To move from place to place, the velvet worm crawls forward using its legs; unlike in arthropods, both legs of a pair are moved simultaneously. The claws of the feet are used only on hard, rough terrain where a firm grip is needed; on soft substrates, such as moss, the velvet worm walks on the foot cushions at the base of the claws.

Actual locomotion is achieved less by the exertion of the leg muscles than by local changes of body length. This can be controlled using the annular and longitudinal muscles. If the annular muscles are contracted, the body cross-section is reduced, and the corresponding segment lengthens; this is the usual mode of operation of the hydrostatic skeleton as also employed by other worms. Due to the stretching, the legs of the segment concerned are lifted and swung forward. Local contraction of the longitudinal muscles then shortens the appropriate segment, and the legs, which are now in contact with the ground, are moved to the rear. This part of the locomotive cycle is the actual leg stroke that is responsible for forward movement. The individual stretches and contractions of the segments are coordinated by the nervous system such that contraction waves run the length of the body, each pair of legs swinging forward and then down and rearward in succession. Macroperipatus can reach speeds of up to four centimeters per second, although speeds of around 6 body-lengths per minute are more typical. The body gets longer and narrower as the animal picks up speed; the length of each leg also varies during each stride.

=== Sociality ===
The brains of Onychophora, though small, are very complex; consequently, the organisms are capable of rather sophisticated social interactions. Behavior may vary from genus to genus, so this article reflects the most-studied genus, Euperipatoides.

The Euperipatoides form social groups of up to fifteen individuals, usually closely related, which will typically live and hunt together. Groups usually live together; in drier regions an example of a shared home would be the moist interior of a rotting log. Group members are extremely aggressive towards individuals from other logs. Dominance is achieved through aggression and maintained through submissive behavior. After a kill, the dominant female always feeds first, followed in turn by the other females, then males, then the young.

When assessing other individuals, individuals often measure one another up by running their antennae down the length of the other individual. Once hierarchy has been established, pairs of individuals will often cluster together to form an "aggregate"; this is fastest in male-female pairings, followed by pairs of females, then pairs of males.

Social hierarchy is established by a number of interactions: Higher-ranking individuals will chase and bite their subordinates while the latter are trying to crawl on top of them. Juveniles never engage in aggressive behavior, but climb on top of adults, which tolerate their presence on their backs. Hierarchy is quickly established among individuals from a single group, but not among organisms from different groups; these are substantially more aggressive and very rarely climb one another or form aggregates. Individuals within an individual log are usually closely related; especially so with males. This may be related to the intense aggression between unrelated females.

=== Growth, development, and reproduction ===
Almost all velvet worms reproduce sexually. The sole exception is Epiperipatus imthurni, which have no males and reproduce by parthenogenesis. In most cases, velvet worms are sexually dimorphic. Females are usually larger than males and can often have more legs. All velvet worms have internal fertilization, though the way this is done varies widely. For most of them, a package of sperm cells called the spermatophore is placed into the female's vagina. In many species, fertilization happens only once. Because of this, copulation can happen before reproductive organs are even fully developed. In cases like this, sperm cells are kept in a special reservoir where they can survive for longer.

The detailed process by which this is achieved is in most cases still unknown, a true penis having been observed only in species of the genus Paraperipatus. In many Australian species, there exist dimples or special dagger- or axe-shaped structures on the head; the male of Florelliceps stutchburyae presses a long spine against the female's genital opening and probably positions its spermatophore there in this way. During the process, the female supports the male by keeping him clasped with the claws of her last pair of legs. The mating behavior of two species of the genus Peripatopsis is particularly curious. Here, the male places two-millimeter spermatophores on the back or sides of the female. Amoebocytes from the female's blood collect on the inside of the deposition site, and both the spermatophore's casing and the body wall on which it rests are decomposed via the secretion of enzymes. This releases the sperm cells, which then move freely through the haemocoel, penetrate the external wall of the ovaries and finally fertilize the ova. Why this self-inflicted skin injury does not lead to bacterial infections is not yet understood (though likely related to the enzymes used to deteriorate the skin or facilitate the transfer of viable genetic material from male to female). Velvet worms are found in egg-laying (oviparous), egg-live-bearing (ovoviviparous) and live-bearing (viviparous) forms.

In a recent peer-reviewed paper published in the "Journal of Zoology", researchers discovered that certain species of Peripatus exhibit a unique form of parental care. Unlike most invertebrates, where parental involvement is minimal, female Peripatus were observed actively guarding their eggs and even providing protection to their offspring after hatching. This finding challenges the conventional understanding of reproductive behavior in invertebrates and highlights the diversity of parenting strategies in the animal kingdom.

- Ovipary occurs solely in the Peripatopsidae, often in regions with erratic food supply or unsettled climate. In these cases, the yolk-rich eggs measure 1.3 to 2.0 mm and are coated in a protective chitinous shell. Maternal care is unknown.
- The majority of species are ovoviviparous: the medium-sized eggs, encased only by a double membrane, remain in the uterus. The embryos do not receive food directly from the mother, but are supplied instead by the moderate quantity of yolk contained in the eggs—they are therefore described as lecithotrophic. The young emerge from the eggs only a short time before birth. This probably represents the velvet worm's original mode of reproduction, i.e., both oviparous and viviparous species developed from ovoviviparous species.
- True live-bearing species are found in both families, particularly in tropical regions with a stable climate and regular food supply throughout the year. The embryos develop from eggs only micrometers in size and are nourished in the uterus by their mother, hence the description "matrotrophic". The supply of food takes place either via a secretion from the mother directly into the uterus or via a genuine tissue connection between the epithelium of the uterus and the developing embryo, known as a placenta. The former is found only outside the American continents, while the latter occurs primarily in America and the Caribbean and more rarely in the Old World. The gestation period can amount to up to 15 months, at the end of which the offspring emerge in an advanced stage of development. The embryos found in the uterus of a single female do not necessarily have to be of the same age; it is quite possible for there to be offspring at different stages of development and descended from different males. In some species, young tend to be released only at certain points in the year.

A female can have between 1 and 23 offspring per year; development from fertilized ovum to adult takes between 6 and 17 months and does not have a larval stage. Velvet worms have been known to live for up to six years.

== Ecology ==
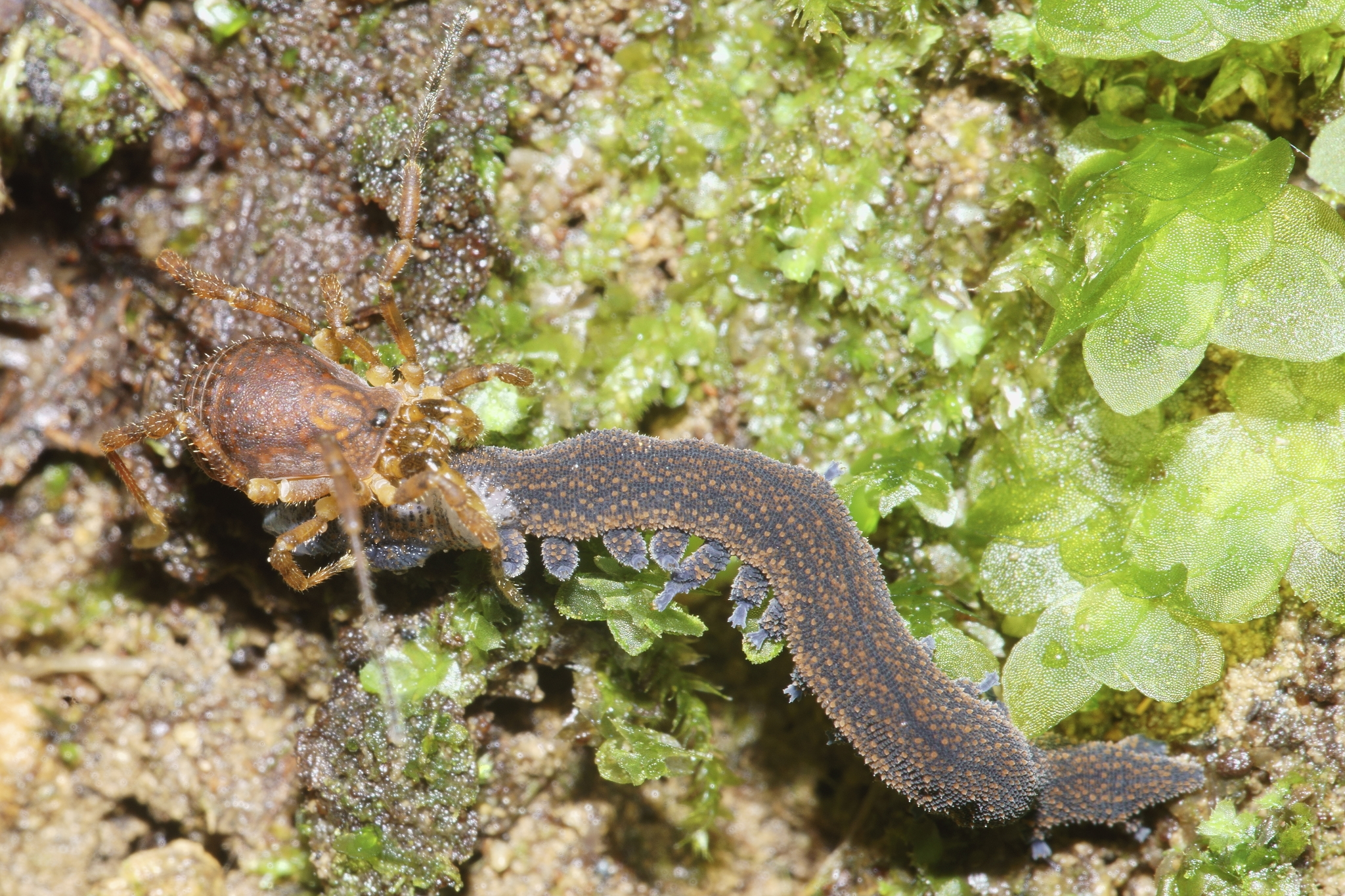
The harvestman Nuncia conjuncta preying on a Peripatoides novaezealandiae velvet worm

The velvet worm's important predators are primarily arthropods such as various spiders and centipedes, along with tetrapods such as rodents and birds. In South America, Hemprichi's coral snake (Micrurus hemprichii) feeds almost exclusively on velvet worms.

For defense, some species roll themselves reflexively into a spiral, while they can also fight off smaller opponents by ejecting slime. Various mites (Acari) are known to be ectoparasites infesting the skin of the velvet worm. Skin injuries are usually accompanied by bacterial infections, which are almost always fatal.

== Evolution ==
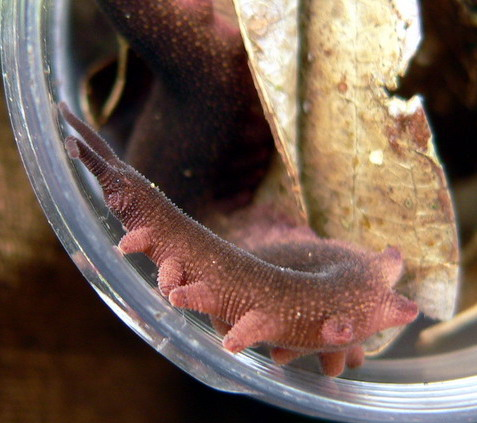
Eoperipatus totoro, a basal member of Peripatidae named after the Catbus in My Neighbor Totoro

=== External phylogeny ===
The closest living relatives of the Onychophora are the arthropods and tardigrades, with the three forming the clade Panarthropoda. Each of these evolved from a broader group of legged, worm-like animals known as lobopodians. Below is a simplified phylogeny showing the clade's major groups (both extant and extinct) and where velvet worms fit within it.

- Panarthropoda
  - † "Lobopodia"
  - - - † "Lobopodia"
      - - Water bears (Tardigrada)
        - † Luolishaniida
    - - † Aysheaiidae
      - Antennopoda
        - - † "Lobopodia"
          - - † Opabiniidae
            - - † Radiodonts (Radiodonta)
              - Arthropods (Arthropoda)
        - Onychophora
          - † Antennacanthopodia
          - Modern velvet worms

=== Internal phylogeny ===
Below is a combined genus-level cladogram of velvet worms containing both extant and extinct species confirmed to be crown or stem-group velvet worms. This phylogeny does not analyze every species and lumps most peripatids into Neopatida, as many Peripatidae genera are paraphyletic. As of 2023, there are around 232 total living species, meaning this phylogeny should eventually be updated.

- Onychophora
  - †Antennacanthopodia
  - - Peripatidae
      - - Eoperipatus
        - - †Cretoperipatus
          - Typhloperipatus
      - - Mesoperipatus
        - Neopatida
    - †Antennipatus
    - Peripatopsidae
      - - Paraperipatus
        - - - - Peripatopsidae sp. MCZ 131371 & MCZ 141416
              - - Ooperipatus
                - - Phallocephale
                  - - Aethrikos
                    - Euperipatoides
            - - Occiperipatoides
              - Kumbadjena
          - - - - Peripatoides
                - Diemenipatus
              - Tasmanipatus
            - Ooperipatellus
      - - - Peripatopsis
          - Metaperipatus
        - Opisthopatus

=== Genomics ===
As of February 2025, velvet worms have had only two nuclear genomes sequenced. These are of Euperipatoides rowelli (a peripatopsid) and Epiperipatus broadwayi (a peripatid). The first one is highly fragmented, while the second is less so, but still needs improvement. Velvet worms seem to display genome gigantism, with the more complete assembly (E. broadwayi) having an size of 5.60 giga-base pairs. Around 70.92% of its genome are repeat sequences, something that contributes to the bulk of its size. While less substantial, it also has very large introns, or parts of a gene that do not become proteins.

=== Taxonomy ===
Compared to other phyla, Onychophora has an odd taxonomic organization. This is partially a consequence of obsolete classification schemes. To illustrate the matter, the two main clades of velvet worms diverged around 274 million years ago during the Late Devonian, have since diversified, but are grouped as families rather than a class or order.

Velvet worms are divided into two main families (Peripatidae and Peripatopsidae). The group also contains three extinct genera (Antennipatus, Antennacanthopodia, and Tritonychus).

Within Peripatidae, the genera Eoperipatus (found in Southeast Asia) and Mesoperipatus (found in Gabon) were the most basal, while the rest of the group is found in tropical regions of the Americas. On the other hand, Peritpatopsidae can be divided into two main clades. One has members in Southern Africa and Chile, while the others live in Australasia.

=== Fossil history ===
==== Insights on decay and fossilization ====
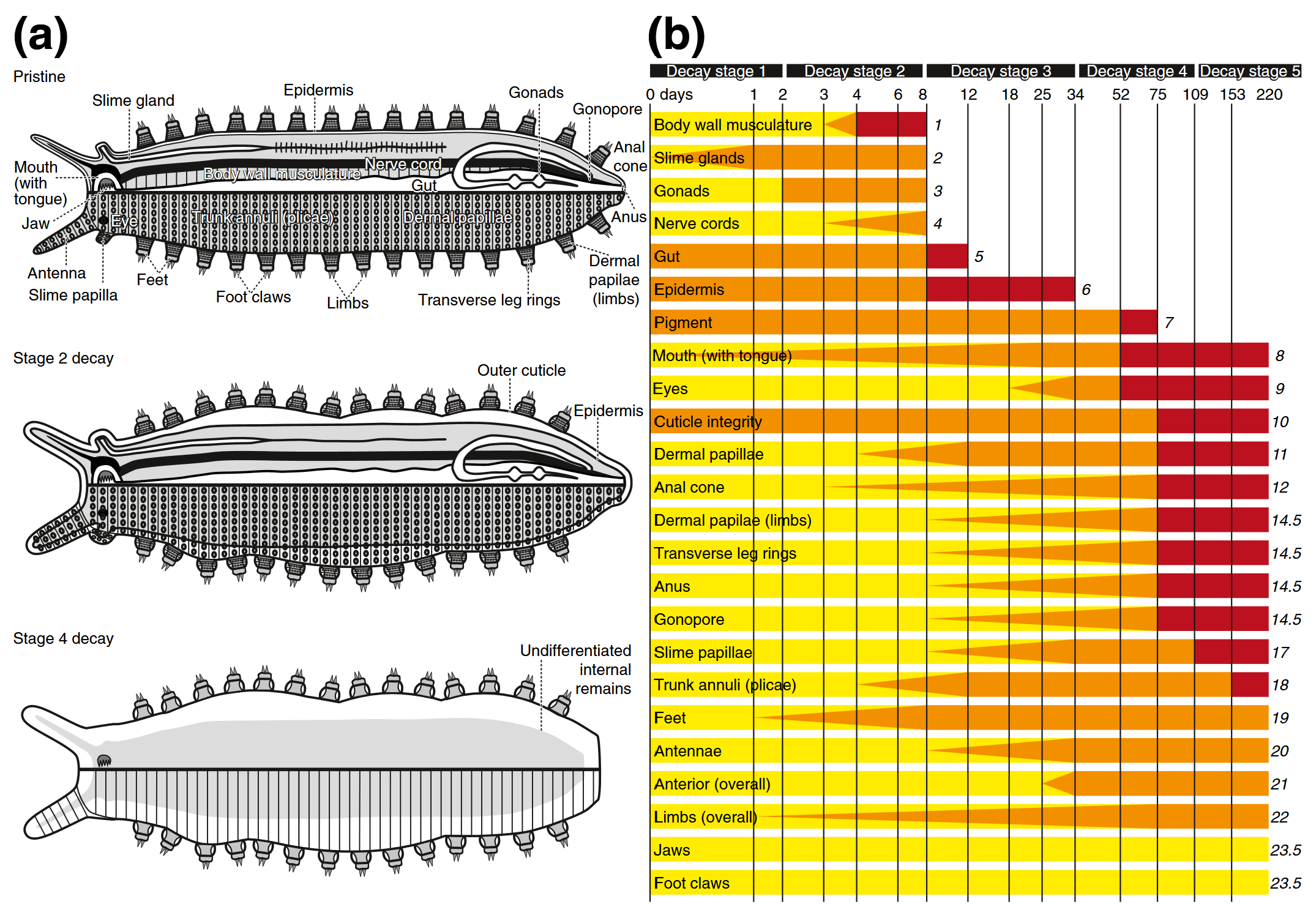
Feature decay timeline. Yellow means "pristine", orange means "decaying", red means "some or all lost"

Due to being soft-bodied, onychophorans need excellent conditions to fossilize. However, even when this happens, their fossils can be subject to taphonomic bias. Experiments were done with modern velvet worms to analyze their decomposition in various saline solutions. The study also investigated whether they experienced something called stemward slippage. In this phenomenon, animals are falsely categorized as more primitive due to the decay of certain features.

The researchers found that different features decayed at significantly different rates. Salinity and time of moult had little effect on decay, and the way things decomposed remained the same for different species (though it could happen at different speeds). Before any degradation, velvet worms flex into a S, U, or circular shape. Most flexing happens in the first 24 hours, but the process can continue for around two more days. In the early stages of decay, the epidermis and outer cuticle separate, causing a bloated appearance. The trunk elongates while increasing in width by around 10–30%. The limbs do the same, increasing in length and width by around 10–25%. Around the same time, the internal organs begin to degrade. This eventually culminates in the gut rupturing, destroying the other organs. In later stages of decay, the body cuticle shrinks close to its original size. A similar trend was found with the limbs, but it was just short of being statistically significant. It's around this time that many external features begin to deteriorate. These include the dermal papillae, leg rings, anus, gonopore, antenna, slime papillae, and eventually eyes. Interestingly, the dermal papillae on the trunk disappear faster than those on the limbs. Even as decay progresses, the body is still recognizable. This stops once the outer cuticle finally ruptures. After that, the animal's anatomy is extremely difficult to interpret. At this stage, the only identifiable features would be the chitinous jaws and claws.

Onychophorans are unlikely to experience stemward slippage since their defining features (jaws, feet, and slime papillae) are generally decay-resistant. However, decomposition has a significant impact on fossil anatomy. For starters, the preserved body outline is probably somewhat inaccurate, as this gets bloated in the decay process. A similar thing happens with the limbs, so this needs to be accounted for when analyzing locomotion and/or leg length. While fossilized onychophorans can appear to display patterning, these are not true to life — pigment granules are one of the first things to degrade and can easily move around in the body. Another finding is that characters such as internal organs or the body cavity are highly unlikely to fossilize. When it comes to placement of the mouth, even moderate decay makes it hard to tell if it is at the front or underside of the head. Additionally, fossils that lack decay-resistant features probably lacked them in life. For example, a fossilized onychophoran (or related animal) with eyes but no claws likely never had claws.

==== Emergence from lobopodians ====
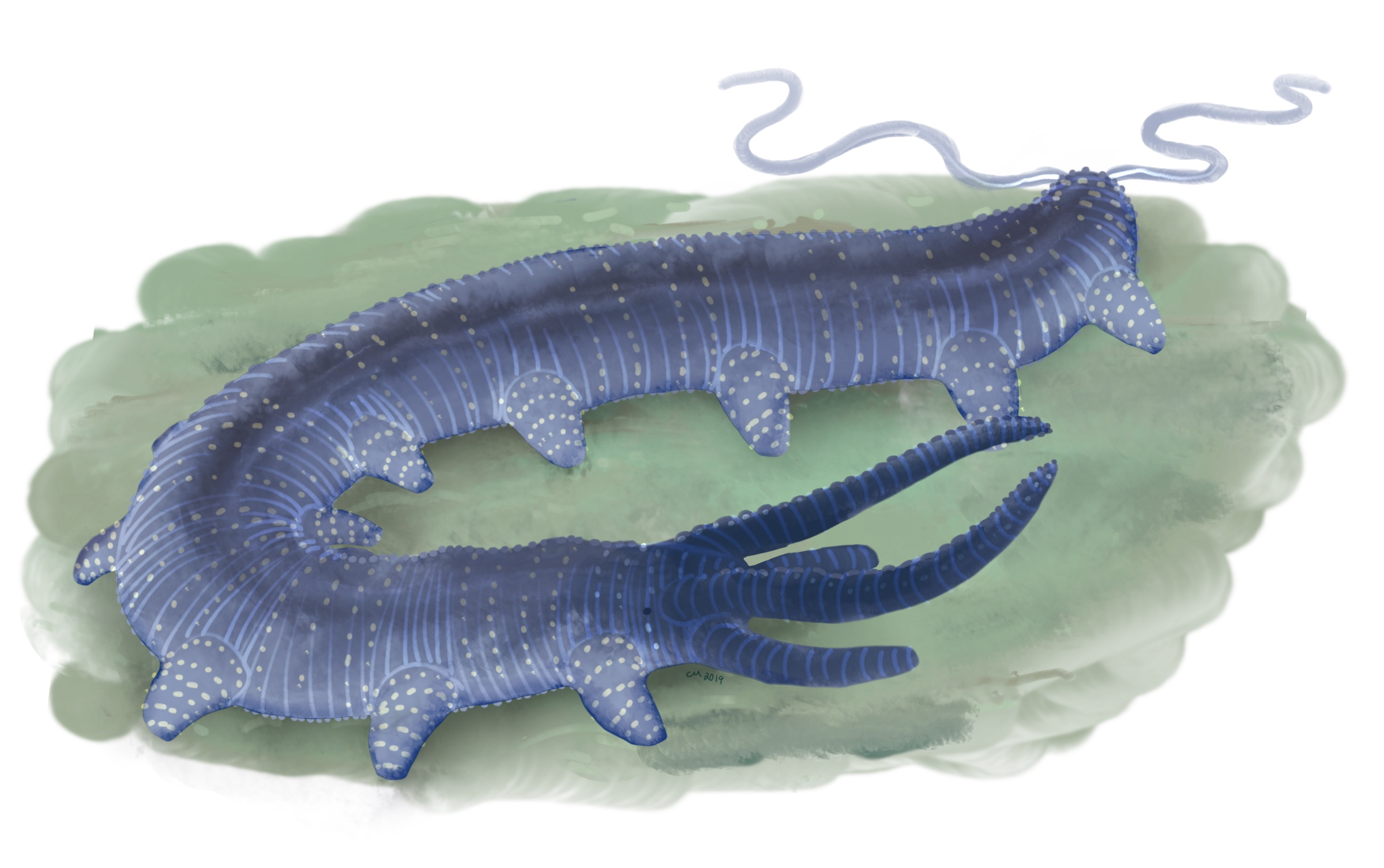
Antennacanthopodia, a close relative of or basal onychophoran

Certain fossils from the Early Cambrian bear a striking resemblance to the velvet worms. These fossils, known collectively as lobopodians, were an evolutionary grade that gave rise to arthropods, tardigrades, onychophorans, and the extinct radiodonts.

How different lobopodians are related varies from study to study. However, with the exception of a single paper, Antennacanthopodia is the only animal to be confidently viewed as a close onychophoran relative. Antennacanthopodia lived during the Cambrian Stage 3 and possessed a variety of onychophoran traits: stubby lobopods, spiny foot pads, an annulated body, and small eyes behind the main antennae. An obvious difference from living onychophorans was that the animal had not one, but two pairs of antennae. These secondary antennae were shorter than the first pair and thought to be homologous with either the slime papillae or jaws of velvet worms. When Onychophora first arose or moved onto land is currently unknown. However, it could have plausibly happened between the Ordovician and Silurian – approximately 490 to 430 million years ago – via the intertidal zone.

==== Velvet worms and their diversification ====
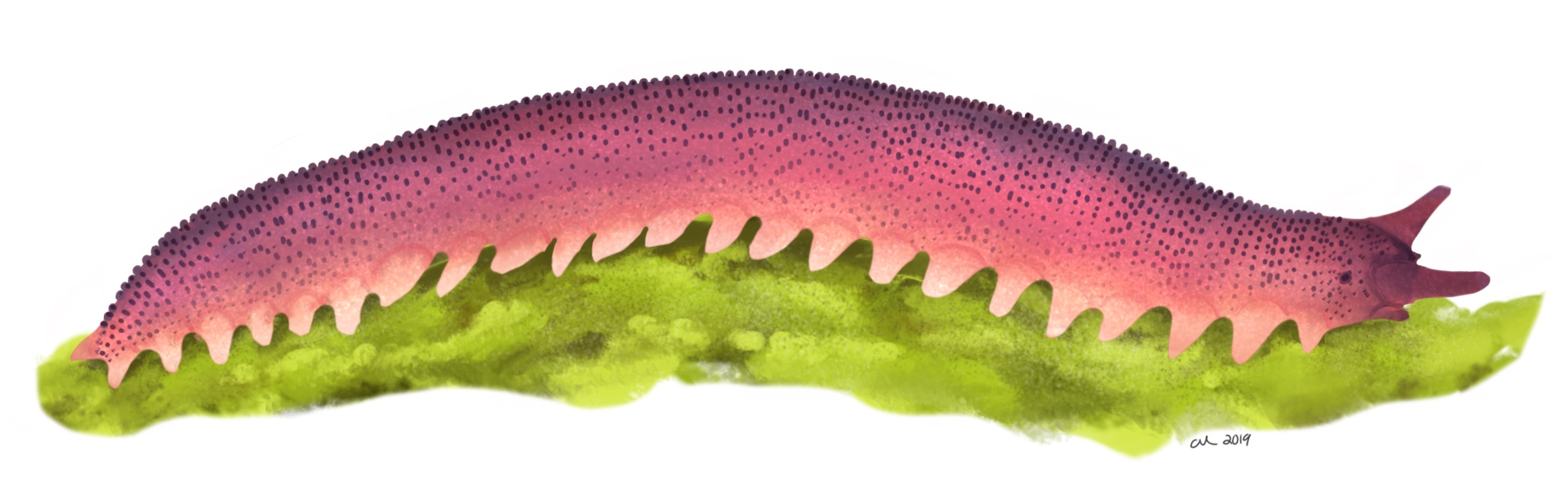
Reconstruction of the Carboniferous possible onychophoran Helenodora

The earliest potential onychophoran, Helenodora, originates from the Mid Pennsylvanian Mazon Creek lagerstätte in the United States. Originally described in 1980, Helenodora was long regarded as the earliest known onychophoran. This changed in 2016 when a paper by Murdock et al. doubted its affinity. Based on the absence of many decay-resistant features (claws, jaws, slime papillae) and unclear ecology (Carbotubulus, a late-surviving aquatic lobopodian, was found in the same formation), the authors of this study placed Helenodora as a basal lobopodian most closely related to Paucipodia.

The earliest definite onychophoran is the French Antennipatus from a Stephanian (Late Pennsylvanian) Lagerstätte in Montceau-les-Mines. This animal had a ventral (bottom facing) mouth, rings of dermal papillae on its trunk and limbs, and was at least somewhat terrestrial because of its slime papillae. However, due to the way it was preserved, it is unknown if Antennipatus belonged to the stem or crown group of the two living families of velvet worm (Peripatidae and Peripatopsidae).

Based on molecular dating, crown-group onychophorans diverged around 376 million years ago in the Late Devonian. This estimation happens regardless if Antennipatus is used to constrain the divergence date, or if no calibration is done at all. The earliest known crown-group onychophoran, Cretoperipatus, is known from multiple specimens in Burmese amber. All are from the same general location and date to a maximum age of around 98.79 million years ago (the earliest Cenomanian of the Late Cretaceous). Based on its morphology, Cretoperipatus was early-diverging member of Peripatidae, most closely related to the Asian genera Eoperipatus and Typhloperipatus.

Despite being preserved in amber, the affinities of the Cenozoic Tertiapatus and Succinipatopsis are surrounded in controversy. Some sources consider them to be onychophorans, while others dismiss this. Ultimately, these animals should be reanalyzed to better grasp their position on the tree of life.

== Conservation status ==
The global conservation status of velvet worm species is difficult to estimate; many species are known only from their type locality where they were first described. The collection of reliable data is hindered by their low population densities, their typically nocturnal behavior, and possibly as-yet undocumented seasonal influences and sexual dimorphism. To date, the only onychophorans evaluated by the IUCN are:

- DD Mesoperipatus tholloni
- NT Plicatoperipatus jamaicensis
- VU Peripatoides indigo
- VU Peripatoides suteri
- VU Peripatopsis alba
- VU Peripatopsis clavigera
- EN Leucopatus anophthalmus
- EN Macroperipatus insularis
- CR Opisthopatus roseus
- CR Peripatopsis leonina
- CR Speleoperipatus spelaeus

The primary threat to velvet worms is destruction and fragmentation of their habitat due to industrialization, draining of wetlands, and slash-and-burn agriculture. The low population densities and restricted geographic ranges of many species means that localized disturbances of ecosystems could lead to the extinction of entire populations or species. Collection of specimens for universities or research institutes may plays a role on a local scale.

There is a pronounced difference in the protection afforded to velvet worms between regions. In South Africa, there are restrictions on both collecting and exporting, while in Australia, there are only export restrictions, and many countries offer no specific safeguards. Tasmania has a protection program that is unique worldwide: one region of forest has its own velvet worm conservation plan tailored to the species (Tasmanipatus barretti).
