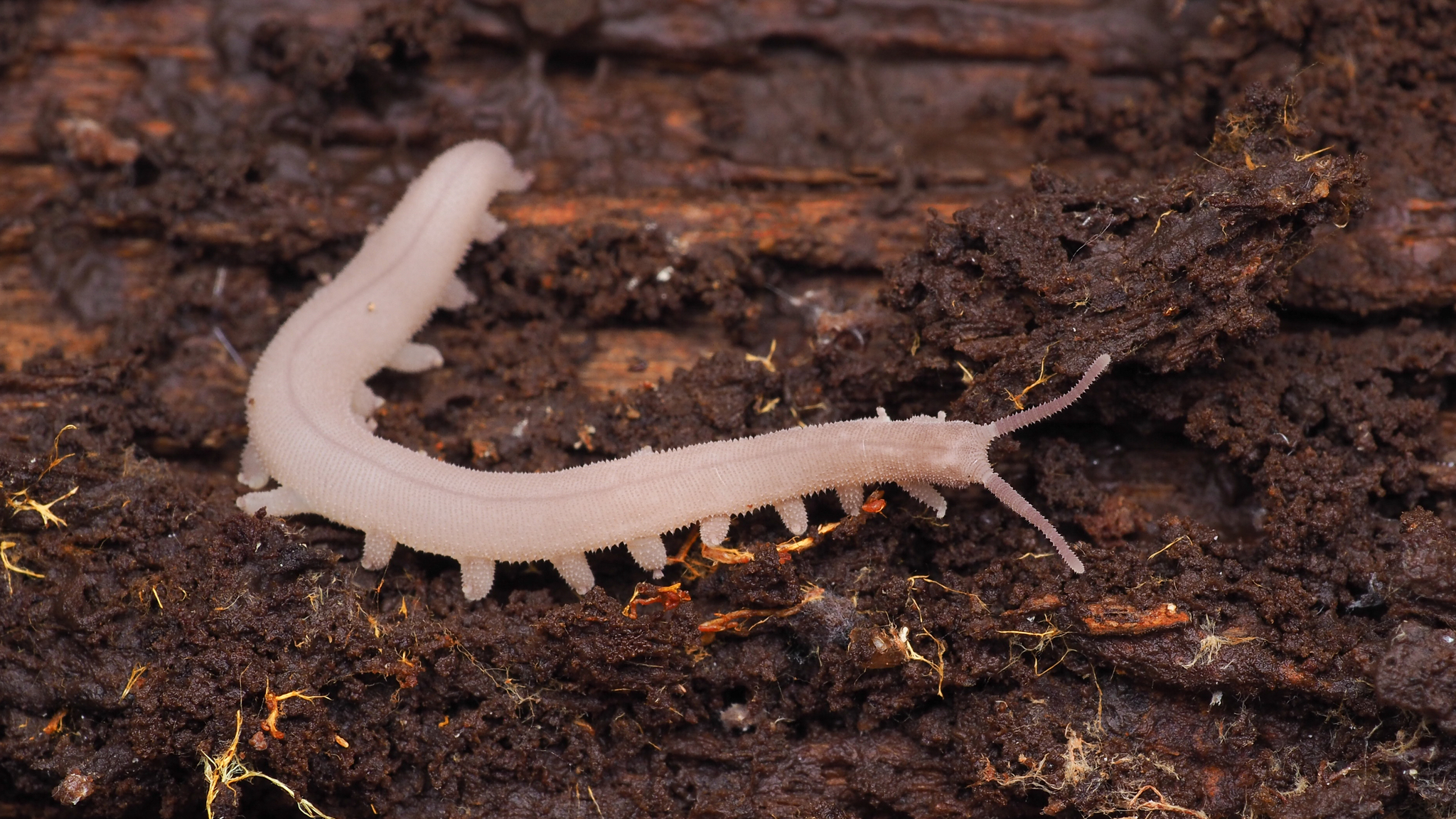
- Tasmanipatus barretti

Scientific classification
- Kingdom: Animalia
- Phylum: Onychophora
- Family: Peripatopsidae
- Genus: Tasmanipatus; Ruhberg, Mesibov, Briscoe & Tait, 1991
- Species: T. barretti

Binomial name
- Tasmanipatus barretti Ruhberg, Mesibov, Briscoe & Tait, 1991
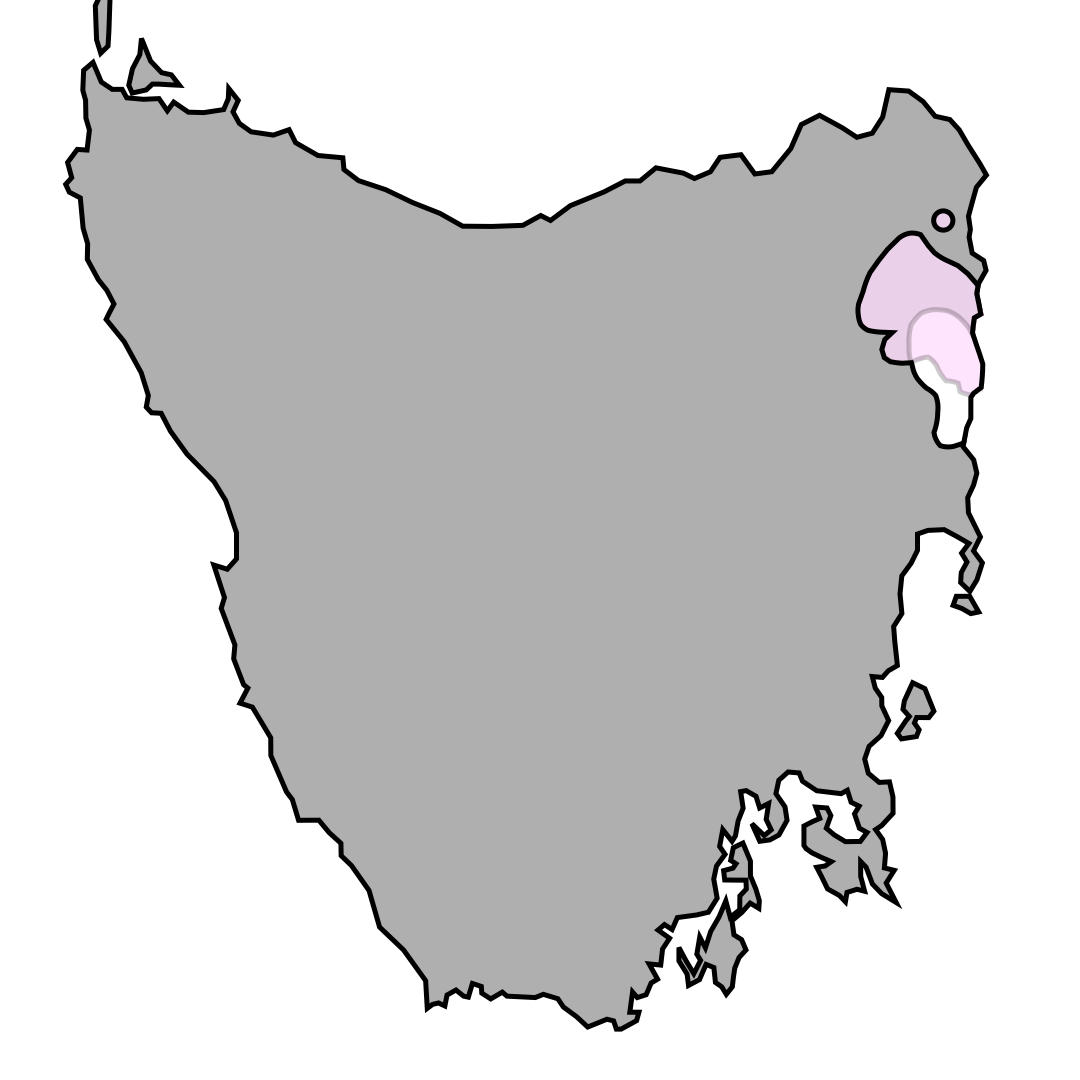
- Map of Tasmania with the distribution Tasmanipatus in pink

Synonyms
- Ooperipatus insignis (Barrett, 1938)

= Tasmanipatus =

Genus of peripatopsid velvet worm

Tasmanipatus barretti, the giant velvet worm, is a species of velvet worm in the Peripatopsidae family. It is the sole species in the genus Tasmanipatus and is ovoviviparous.

== Discovery and naming ==
Tasmanipatus barretti was described by Ruhberg et al. in 1991. The generic name "Tasmanipatus" refers to the species' distribution in Tasmania, Australia. The specific name "barretti" refers to Australian naturalist Charles Leslie Barrett, who was sent a specimen from St Marys. Barrett is thought to have published the first record of the species, though he did not recognize it as a new species. The animal's common name refers to its size, being fairly large when compared to other Peripatopsids. However, much larger velvet worms exist in the family Peripatidae (see Mongeperipatus solorzanoi).

== Description ==
Tasmanipatus has a mauve colored back with a slightly darker dorsomedial furrow running along its midline. The animal has a pair of antennae, two ocelli, a pair of Slime papillae, and 15 pairs of legs called lobopods. Adults are typically 35-40 millimeters long but can extend to 75 millimeters while walking.

== Classification ==
Tasmanipatus is an onychophoran from the family Peripatopsidae. It falls within a large Australasian clade, being closely related to southern genera like Diemenipatus, Peripatoides, and Ooperipatellus. Below is a genus-level phylogeny of Peripatopsid velvet worms. As it doesn't include every genus of peripatopsid, it eventually needs updating.

- Peripatopsidae
  - Australasian Clade
    - Paraperipatus
    - - Australian Clade
        - - Peripatopsidae sp. MCZ 131371 & MCZ 141416
          - - Ooperipatus
            - - Phallocephale
              - - Aethrikos
                - Euperipatoides
        - - Occiperipatoides
          - Kumbadjena
      - South Oceanian Clade
        - - - Peripatoides
            - Diemenipatus
          - Tasmanipatus
        - Ooperipatellus
  - Afro‑American Clade
    - - Peripatopsis
      - Metaperipatus
    - Opisthopatus

== Distribution and habitat ==
The species lives in Tasmania.
