= Cephalofovea cameroni =

Scientific classification
- Kingdom: Animalia
- Phylum: Onychophora
- Family: Peripatopsidae
- Genus: Cephalofovea
- Species: C. cameroni

Binomial name
- Cephalofovea cameroni Reid et al., 1995

Species of Peripatopsid velvet worm

Cephalofovea cameroni is a species of ovoviviparous velvet worm in the family Peripatopsidae. This species has 15 pairs of oncopods (legs) and lives in rotting logs and leaf litter. The type locality is Rydal, New South Wales, Australia. Like all members of the genus Cephalofovea, both sexes of C. cameroni have a furrow on the head, between the antennae, which the male everts to carry his spermatophore to the female.
