= Nodocapitus inornatus =

Scientific classification
- Kingdom: Animalia
- Phylum: Onychophora
- Family: Peripatopsidae
- Genus: Nodocapitus
- Species: N. inornatus

Binomial name
- Nodocapitus inornatus Reid, 1996

Species of Peripatopsid velvet worm

Nodocapitus inornatus is a species of velvet worm in the family Peripatopsidae. The type locality of this species is Gibraltar Range National Park, New South Wales, Australia. This species has 15 pairs of legs in both sexes. The males are distinguished by enlarged papillae on the head, between the antennae.
