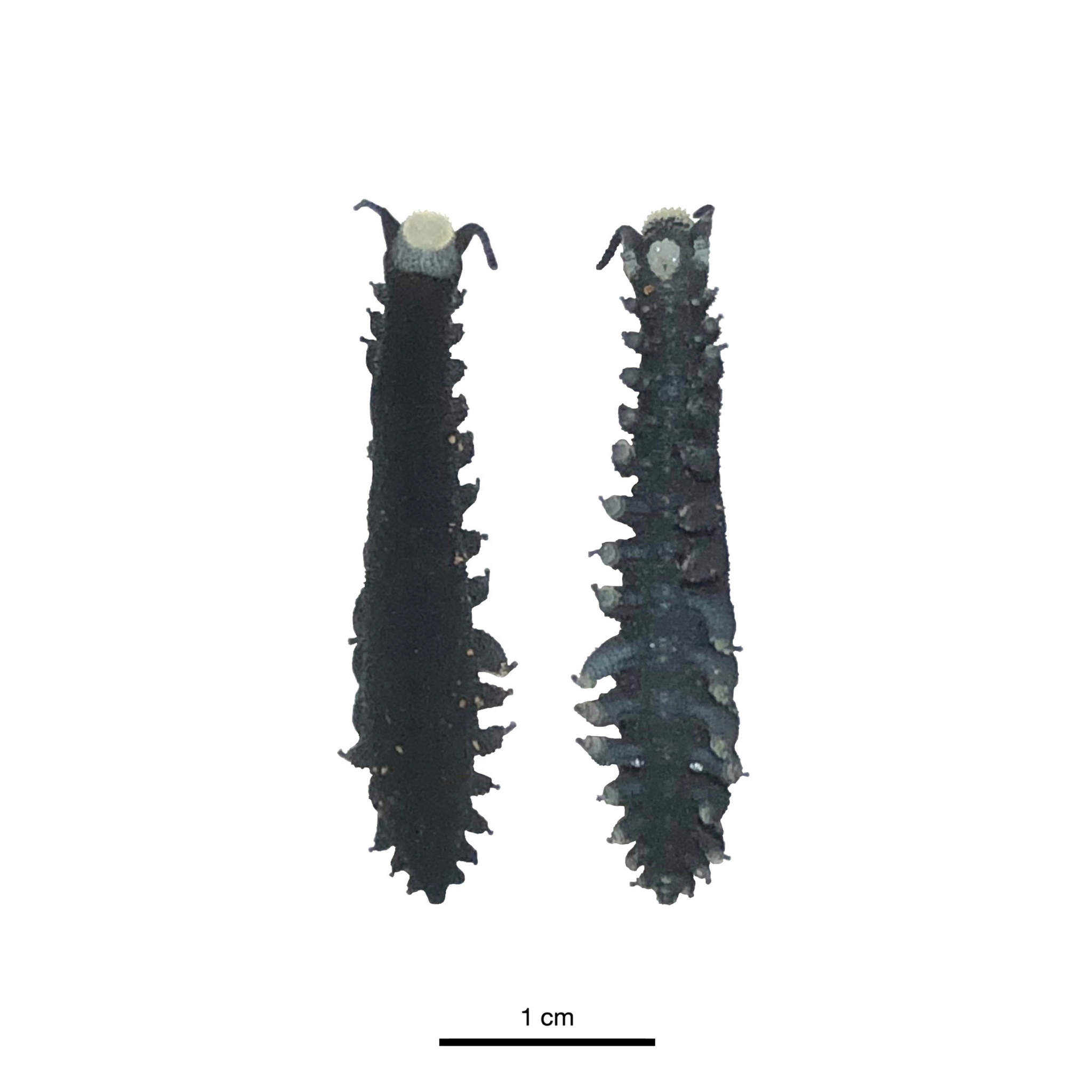

Scientific classification
- Kingdom: Animalia
- Phylum: Onychophora
- Family: Peripatopsidae
- Genus: Cephalofovea
- Species: C. pavimenta

Binomial name
- Cephalofovea pavimenta Reid et al., 1995

= Cephalofovea pavimenta =

Species of Peripatopsid velvet worm

Cephalofovea pavimenta is a species of velvet worm in the Peripatopsidae family. It is only known from the type locality; Mount Canobolas in New South Wales, Australia.

== Etymology ==
The specific epithet pavimenta is derived from the Latin pavimentum, meaning pavement, and refers to the pavement-like morphology of the papillae on the male's modified head structure.

== Morphology ==
Like other members of the genus Cephalofovea, C. pavimenta is ovoviviparous, has 15 pairs of oncopods (legs), and both sexes possess a pitted head which the male everts and uses to pass his spermatophore to the female. C. pavimenta is distinctive among members of its genus in that its integument is pigmented nearly uniformly, without a distinctive pattern. Both sexes occur in two colour morphs: greyish-blue, or tan with grey mottling. Both morphs have slightly paler pigmentation on the ventral surface of the body.
