= Planipapillus annae =

Scientific classification
- Kingdom: Animalia
- Phylum: Onychophora
- Family: Peripatopsidae
- Genus: Planipapillus
- Species: P. annae

Binomial name
- Planipapillus annae Reid, 2000

Species of Peripatopsid velvet worm

Planipapillus annae is a species of velvet worm in the Peripatopsidae family. This species is oviparous, has 15 pairs of legs, and lives in and under logs in dry woodland. It is found in Victoria, Australia.
