= Nodocapitus formosus =

Scientific classification
- Kingdom: Animalia
- Phylum: Onychophora
- Family: Peripatopsidae
- Genus: Nodocapitus
- Species: N. formosus

Binomial name
- Nodocapitus formosus Reid, 1996

Species of Peripatopsid velvet worm

Nodocapitus formosus is a species of velvet worm in the family Peripatopsidae. The type locality of this species is Mount Elliot, Queensland, Australia. This species has 15 pairs of legs in both sexes. The males are distinguished by enlarged papillae on the head, between the antennae.
