= Ooperipatus lepidus =

Scientific classification
- Kingdom: Animalia
- Phylum: Onychophora
- Family: Peripatopsidae
- Genus: Ooperipatus
- Species: O. lepidus

Binomial name
- Ooperipatus lepidus Reid, 2000

Species of egg-laying Peripatopsid velvet worm

Ooperipatus lepidus is a species of velvet worm in the Peripatopsidae family. This species has 15 pairs of legs. It is found in Victoria, Australia.
