= Planipapillus absonus =

Scientific classification
- Kingdom: Animalia
- Phylum: Onychophora
- Family: Peripatopsidae
- Genus: Planipapillus
- Species: P. absonus

Binomial name
- Planipapillus absonus Douch & Reid, 2023

Species of Peripatopsid velvet worm

Planipapillus absonus is a species of velvet worm in the family Peripatopsidae. It was described by James K. Douch and Amanda L. Reid in 2023. The specific epithet refers to the uniqueness of this species within its genus, in that the males lack any patch of reduced papillae posterior to the eyes. It is only known from the type locality, on Mount Useful in Victoria, Australia.
