= Ooperipatus centunculus =

Scientific classification
- Kingdom: Animalia
- Phylum: Onychophora
- Family: Peripatopsidae
- Genus: Ooperipatus
- Species: O. centunculus

Binomial name
- Ooperipatus centunculus Reid, 1996

Species of egg-laying Peripatopsid velvet worm

Ooperipatus centunculus is a species of velvet worm in the Peripatopsidae family.

== Taxonomy ==
Ooperipatus centunculus was described by Reid in 1996, from specimens collected on Mount Donna Buang, Victoria, Australia. The specific name centunculus means cloth of many colours, and refers to this species' striking and variable colouration.

== Description ==
Dorsal colouration is variable and may be tan, greyish blue, olive green, or umber brown. A series of pale diamonds extend across the midline, often surrounded by a darker border. The ventral surface is mottled tan and dark grey. Males have a mean body length of approximately 125 mm; females 145 mm. This species has 15 pairs of legs in both sexes. The species has been found in coiled Eucalyptus bark and Lophozonia cunninghamii litter. Individuals usually remain flat when disturbed and do not coil.
