= Planipapillus taylori =

Scientific classification
- Kingdom: Animalia
- Phylum: Onychophora
- Family: Peripatopsidae
- Genus: Planipapillus
- Species: P. taylori

Binomial name
- Planipapillus taylori Reid, 1996

Species of Peripatopsid velvet worm

Planipapillus taylori is a species of velvet worm in the Peripatopsidae family. This species has 15 pairs of legs in both sexes. It is found in New South Wales, Australia.
