= Planipapillus berti =

Scientific classification
- Kingdom: Animalia
- Phylum: Onychophora
- Family: Peripatopsidae
- Genus: Planipapillus
- Species: P. berti

Binomial name
- Planipapillus berti Reid, 2000

Species of Peripatopsid velvet worm

Planipapillus berti is a species of velvet worm in the Peripatopsidae family. This species is oviparous, has 15 pairs of legs, and lives in and under logs in dry woodland. It is found in Victoria, Australia.
