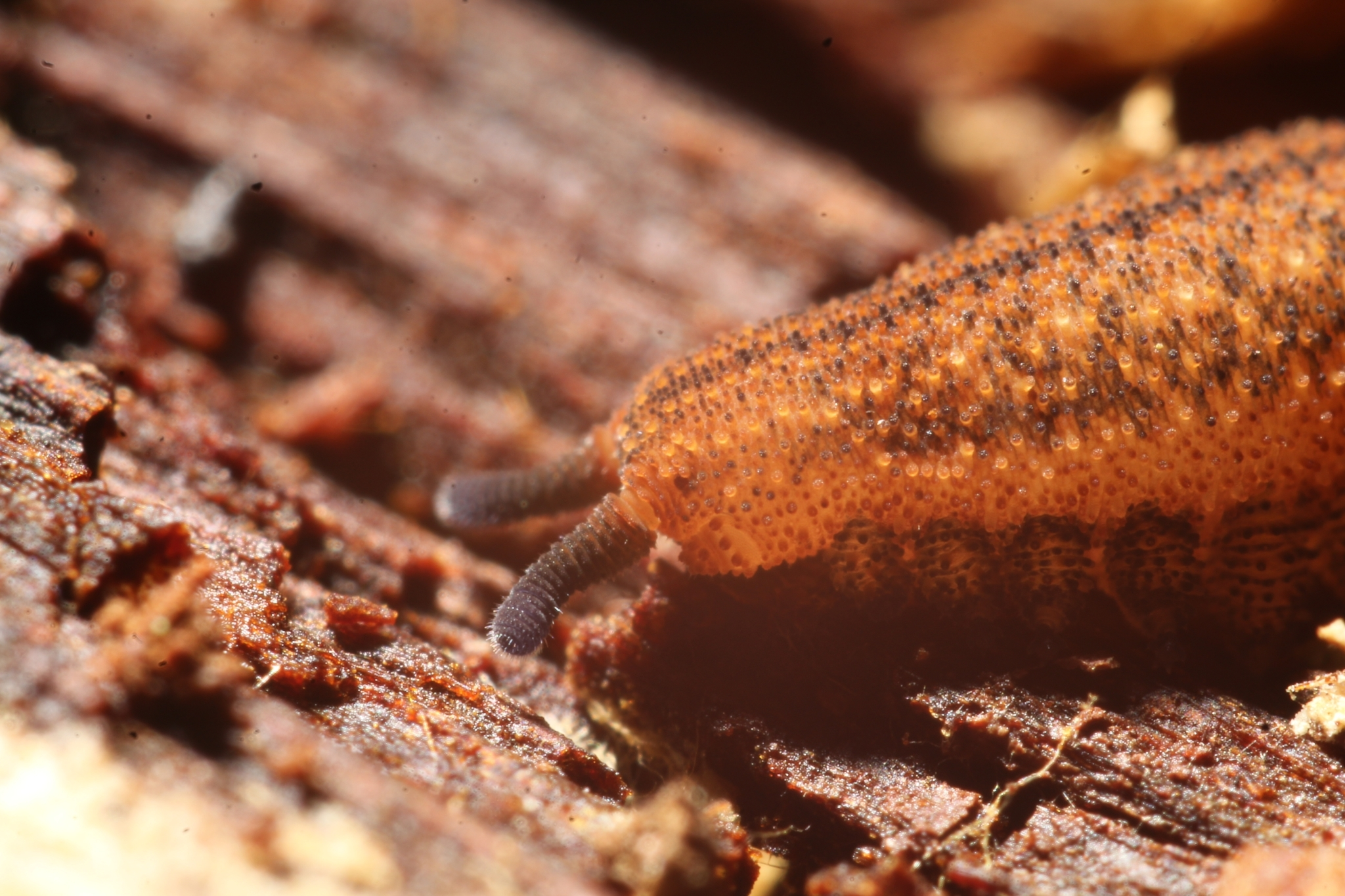

Scientific classification
- Kingdom: Animalia
- Phylum: Onychophora
- Family: Peripatopsidae
- Genus: Kumbadjena
- Species: K. kaata

Binomial name
- Kumbadjena kaata Reid, 2002

= Kumbadjena kaata =

Species of Peripatopsid velvet worm

Kumbadjena kaata is a species of velvet worm in the family Peripatopsidae. This species has 15 pairs of legs. The type locality is in Western Australia.
