= Hylonomoipos brookensis =

Scientific classification
- Kingdom: Animalia
- Phylum: Onychophora
- Family: Peripatopsidae
- Genus: Hylonomoipos
- Species: H. brookensis

Binomial name
- Hylonomoipos brookensis Reid, 1996

Species of Peripatopsid velvet worm

Hylonomoipos brookensis is a species of velvet worm in the Peripatopsidae family. This species has 15 pairs of legs in both sexes. It is found in Queensland, Australia.
