= Ooperipatus hispidus =

Scientific classification
- Kingdom: Animalia
- Phylum: Onychophora
- Family: Peripatopsidae
- Genus: Ooperipatus
- Species: O. hispidus

Binomial name
- Ooperipatus hispidus Reid, 1996

Species of egg-laying Peripatopsid velvet worm

Ooperipatus hispidus is a species of velvet worm in the Peripatopsidae family. This species has 15 pairs of legs in both sexes. It is found in New South Wales, Australia.
