= Planipapillus impacris =

Scientific classification
- Kingdom: Animalia
- Phylum: Onychophora
- Family: Peripatopsidae
- Genus: Planipapillus
- Species: P. impacris

Binomial name
- Planipapillus impacris Reid, 2000

Species of Peripatopsid velvet worm

Planipapillus impacris is a species of velvet worm in the Peripatopsidae family. This species is oviparous, has 15 pairs of legs, and lives in decaying logs. It is found in New South Wales, Australia.
