= Cephalofovea clandestina =

Scientific classification
- Kingdom: Animalia
- Phylum: Onychophora
- Family: Peripatopsidae
- Genus: Cephalofovea
- Species: C. clandestina

Binomial name
- Cephalofovea clandestina Reid et al., 1995

Species of Peripatopsid velvet worm

Cephalofovea clandestina is a species of ovoviviparous velvet worm in the family Peripatopsidae. This species has 15 pairs of oncopods (legs) and lives in rotting logs and leaf litter. The type locality is Kanangra-Boyd National Park, New South Wales, Australia. Like all members of the genus Cephalofovea, both sexes of C. clandestina have a furrow on the head, between the antennae, which the male everts to carry his spermatophore to the female.
