= Kumbadjena shannonensis =

Scientific classification
- Kingdom: Animalia
- Phylum: Onychophora
- Family: Peripatopsidae
- Genus: Kumbadjena
- Species: K. shannonensis

Binomial name
- Kumbadjena shannonensis Reid, 2002

Species of Peripatopsid velvet worm

Kumbadjena shannonensis is a species of velvet worm in the Peripatopsidae family. This species has 15 pairs of legs. The type locality is in Western Australia.
