= Ruhbergia brevicorna =

Scientific classification
- Kingdom: Animalia
- Phylum: Onychophora
- Family: Peripatopsidae
- Genus: Ruhbergia
- Species: R. brevicorna

Binomial name
- Ruhbergia brevicorna Reid, 1996

Species of Peripatopsid velvet worm

Ruhbergia brevicorna is a species of velvet worm in the Peripatopsidae family. This species has 15 pairs of legs in both sexes. The type locality is in New South Wales, Australia.
