= Ooperipatus costatus =

Scientific classification
- Kingdom: Animalia
- Phylum: Onychophora
- Family: Peripatopsidae
- Genus: Ooperipatus
- Species: O. costatus

Binomial name
- Ooperipatus costatus Reid, 1996

Species of egg-laying Peripatopsid velvet worm

Ooperipatus costatus is a species of velvet worm in the Peripatopsidae family. This species has 15 pairs of legs in both sexes. It is found in New South Wales and the Australian Capital Territory.
