= Planipapillus gracilis =

Scientific classification
- Kingdom: Animalia
- Phylum: Onychophora
- Family: Peripatopsidae
- Genus: Planipapillus
- Species: P. gracilis

Binomial name
- Planipapillus gracilis Reid, 2000

Species of Peripatopsid velvet worm

Planipapillus gracilis is a species of velvet worm in the Peripatopsidae family. This species is oviparous, has 15 pairs of legs, and lives in and under dry pieces of timber. It is found in Victoria, Australia.
