= Nodocapitus barryi =

Scientific classification
- Kingdom: Animalia
- Phylum: Onychophora
- Family: Peripatopsidae
- Genus: Nodocapitus
- Species: N. barryi

Binomial name
- Nodocapitus barryi Reid, 1996

Species of Peripatopsid velvet worm

Nodocapitus barryi is a species of velvet worm in the family Peripatopsidae. This species has 15 pairs of legs in both sexes. It is found in southeastern Queensland and northeastern New South Wales, Australia. The males are distinguished by enlarged papillae on the head, between the antennae.
