= Planipapillus vittatus =

Scientific classification
- Kingdom: Animalia
- Phylum: Onychophora
- Family: Peripatopsidae
- Genus: Planipapillus
- Species: P. vittatus

Binomial name
- Planipapillus vittatus Reid, 2000

Species of Peripatopsid velvet worm

Planipapillus vittatus is a species of velvet worm in the Peripatopsidae family. This species is oviparous, has 15 pairs of legs, and lives under dry logs. It is found in Victoria, Australia.
