= Ruhbergia rostroides =

Scientific classification
- Kingdom: Animalia
- Phylum: Onychophora
- Family: Peripatopsidae
- Genus: Ruhbergia
- Species: R. rostroides

Binomial name
- Ruhbergia rostroides Reid, 1996

Species of Peripatopsid velvet worm

Ruhbergia rostroides is a species of velvet worm in the Peripatopsidae family.

== Description ==
This species has 15 pairs of legs in both sexes.

== Distribution ==
The type locality is in New South Wales, Australia.
