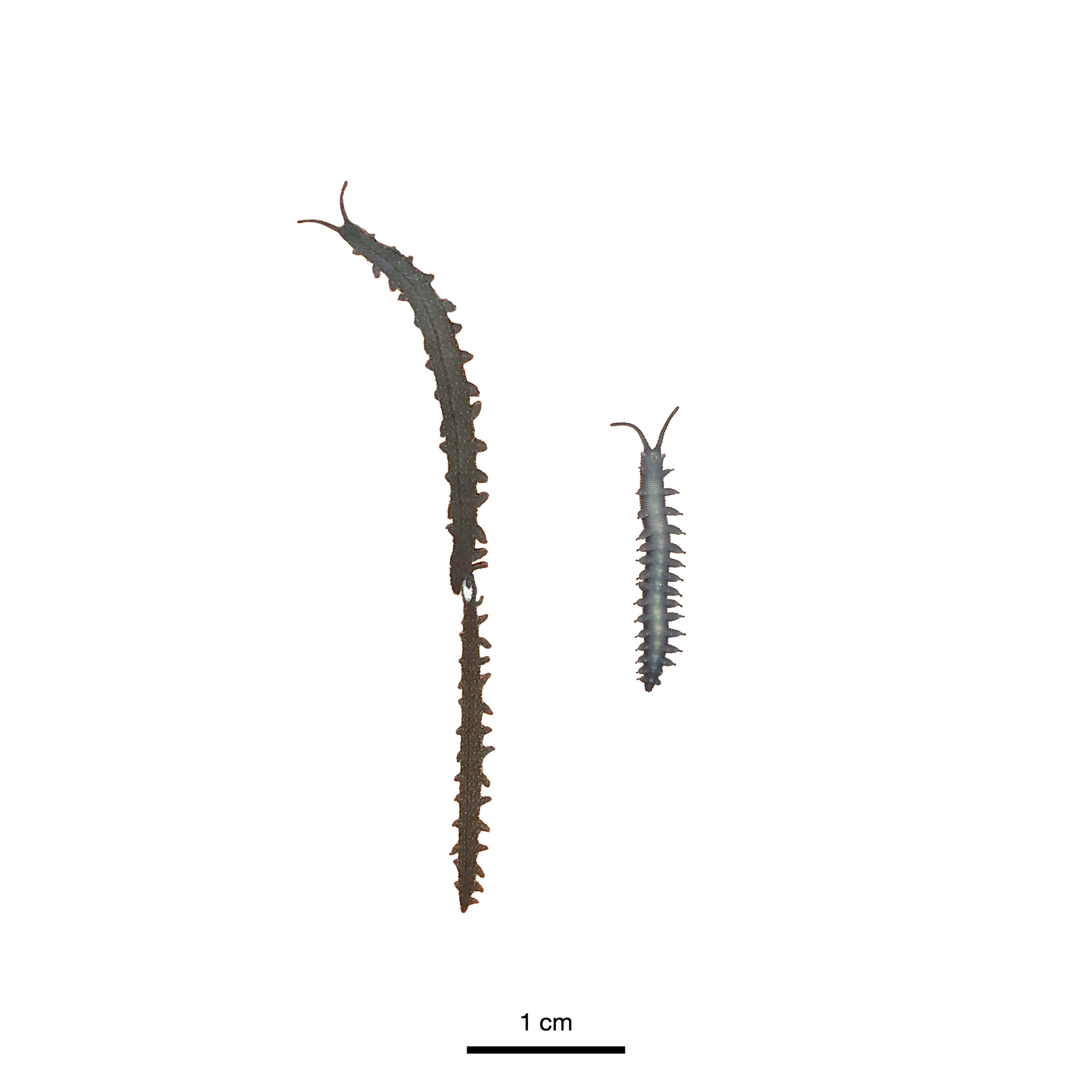

Scientific classification
- Kingdom: Animalia
- Phylum: Onychophora
- Family: Peripatopsidae
- Genus: Planipapillus
- Species: P. mundus

Binomial name
- Planipapillus mundus Reid, 1996

= Planipapillus mundus =

Species of Peripatopsid velvet worm

Planipapillus mundus is a species of velvet worm in the family Peripatopsidae. This species has 15 pairs of legs in both sexes. It is found in New South Wales, Australia. Mating in this species occurs via the head-to-tail configuration, in which the male uses its head to inseminate the female's gonopore.
