= Austroperipatus eridelos =

Scientific classification
- Kingdom: Animalia
- Phylum: Onychophora
- Family: Peripatopsidae
- Genus: Austroperipatus
- Species: A. eridelos

Binomial name
- Austroperipatus eridelos Reid, 1996

Species of Peripatopsid velvet worm

Austroperipatus eridelos is a species of velvet worm in the Peripatopsidae family. This species has 15 pairs of legs in both sexes.
