= Lathropatus =

Scientific classification
- Kingdom: Animalia
- Phylum: Onychophora
- Family: Peripatopsidae
- Genus: Lathropatus; Reid, 2000
- Species: L. nemorum

Binomial name
- Lathropatus nemorum Reid, 2000

Genus and species of Peripatopsid velvet worm

Lathropatus is a monospecific genus of ovoviviparous velvet worm containing the single species Lathropatus nemorum, which has 15 pairs of oncopods (legs). It is endemic to the state of Victoria, Australia.

== Etymology ==
The generic name Lathropatus derives from the Greek lathrios ("secret" or "hidden") and peripatos ("walking"), the latter forming the basis of the name Onychophora and several related genera. While the specific epithet nemorum is derived from the Greek nemos, meaning "forest" or "wood", referring to the habitat in which the species occurs.

== Appearance ==
Females measure 1.02–1.25 mm in head width including eyes, while males are slightly smaller at 0.85–1.05 mm. The body is pigmented, with pigment insoluble in alcohol. Ground colour ranges from tan and brown to olive green or greyish-blue. Primary papillae are light-coloured basally and dark-tipped distally, and a mid-dorsal dark stripe may be present or absent.

Dorsal papillae vary in size and distribution, forming semicircular or patch-like arrangements. Sexual dimorphism is evident in the number and arrangement of papillae, with females generally bearing a greater number per segment. Alternate plicae possess markedly enlarged primary papillae. The dorsum bears 12 complete plicae between oncopods, with wide and narrow folds alternating.

Oncopods are cylindrical and uniform in size. Papillar scales are ribbed proximally and smooth distally. Tan or cream-coloured patches occur at the junction between the body and the feet. Ventral organs are white or cream, and newborn individuals lack pigmentation. Papillae surrounding the anal opening are pigmented similarly to the rest of the body. Spinous pads are pale yellow to tan and well developed on all oncopods.

The antennae consist of approximately 30 rings, with wide and narrow rings alternating. Rings may be uniformly coloured or banded with tan pigmentation, and each ring bears a row of bristles. The distal 8–9 antennal rings possess sensory bulbs, while the proximal rings are expanded ventrally to form sensory pads. Eyes are present in both sexes.

Primary papillae possess a smooth region surrounding the distal foramen, which is ovoid or lip-shaped and does not extend to the papillar margin.

== Reproduction ==
Males' gonopore is located between the last pair of oncopods. Crural glands and papillae are present on oncopods 2–14. The vasa efferentia are thin-walled and fuse to form the vas deferens. A spermatophore pouch is present.

Females lack an ovipositor and are ovoviviparous. Ovarian tubes are suspended along the pericardial floor. Embryos develop within individual uteri at successive stages. Accessory glands are present, while a receptaculum ovorum is absent.

== Habitat ==
All type specimens were collected from decomposing logs in dry sclerophyll forest. Dominant vegetation includes Eucalyptus obliqua, E. baxteri, E. viminalis and E. willisii. Additional specimens were found in pine plantations, indicating tolerance of modified habitats where sufficient decomposing timber is available.

== Ecology ==
Individuals are cryptic and associated with rotting wood. Specimens were typically found lying flat, with the anterior portion of the body curved and the head partially tucked into a loop of the body. The species is presumed to be a nocturnal predator of small invertebrates, as in other velvet worms.

== Distribution ==
The species is known only from the Cobboboonee National Park region in state Victoria, Australia.

== Taxonomy ==
Some non-type specimens lack the distinct mid-dorsal dark patches observed in the type series. Given the narrow geographic range and the tendency toward cryptic speciation in Onychophora, these specimens are assigned tentatively to Lathropatus nemorum. Molecular analyses will likely be required to clarify species boundaries and phylogenetic relationships.
