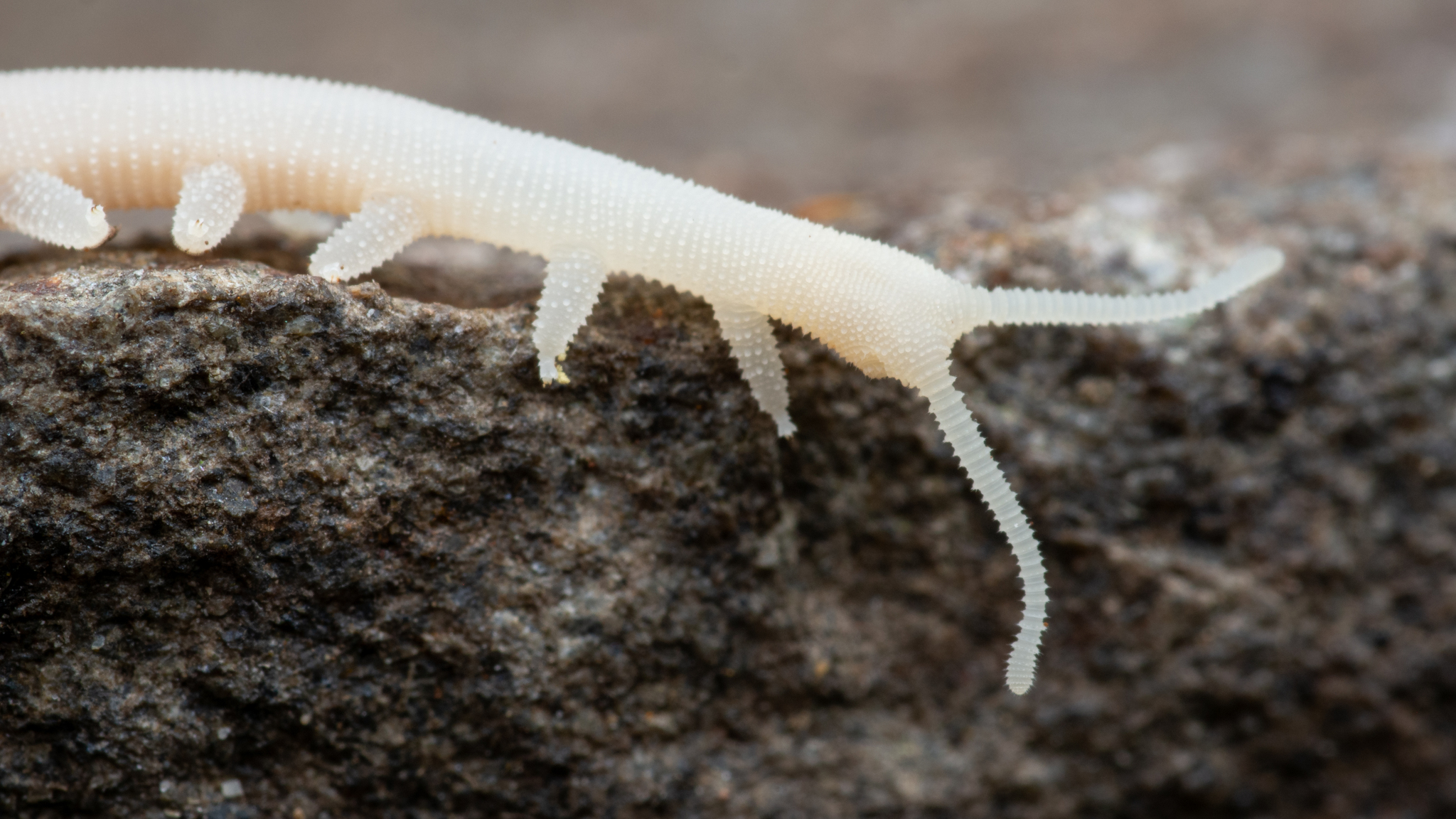

Conservation status
- Endangered (IUCN 2.3)

Scientific classification
- Kingdom: Animalia
- Phylum: Onychophora
- Family: Peripatopsidae
- Genus: Leucopatus; Oliveira, Ruhberg, Rowell & Mayer, 2018
- Species: L. anophthalmus

Binomial name
- Leucopatus anophthalmus (Ruhberg, Mesibov, Briscoe & Tait, 1991)
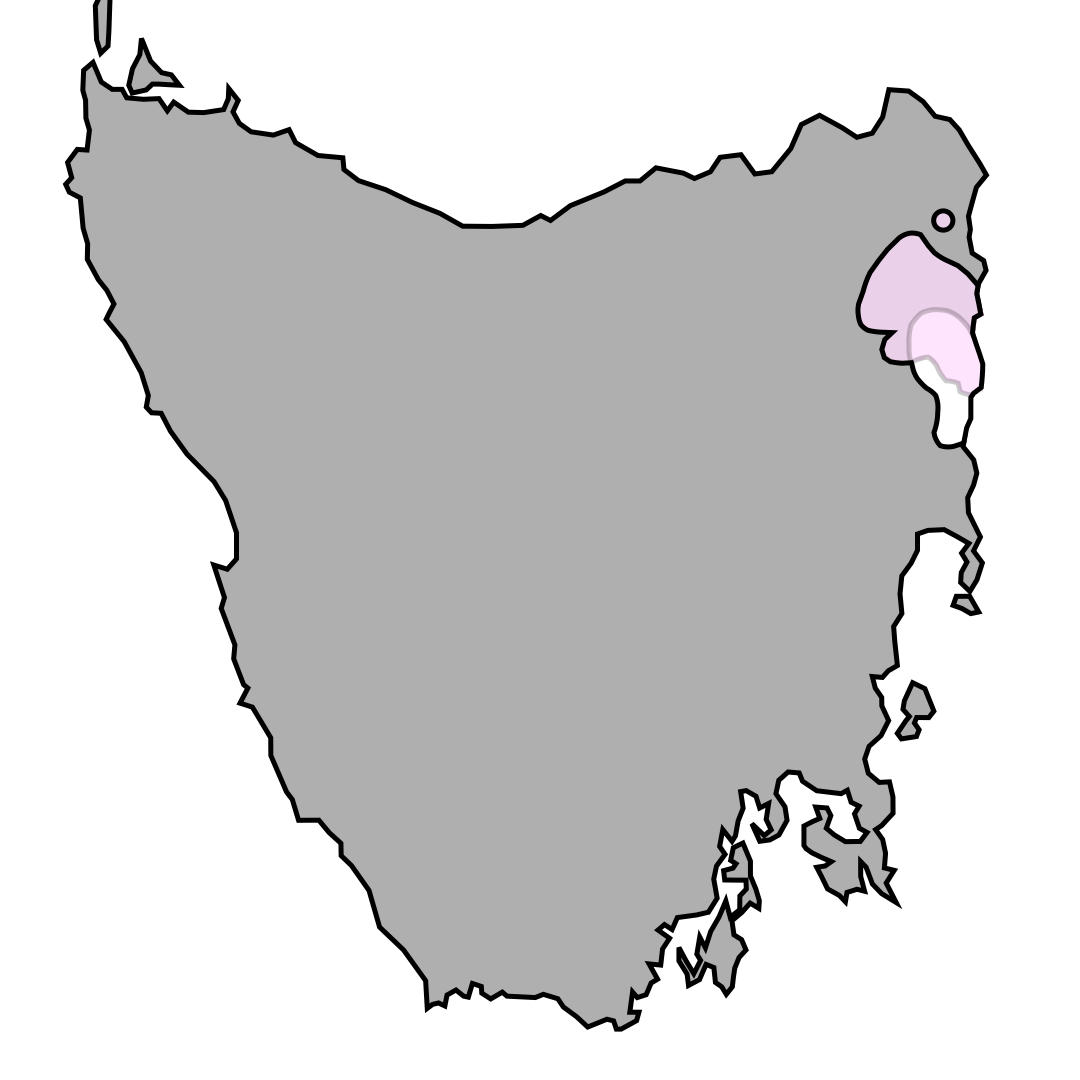
- Map of Tasmania with the distribution of Leucopatus anophthalmus in white.

Synonyms
- Tasmanipatus anophthalmus Ruhberg, Mesibov, Briscoe & Tait, 1991

= Leucopatus =

Genus and species of endangered, eyeless, Peripatopsid velvet worm

Leucopatus is a genus of velvet worm in the family Peripatopsidae, containing a single species, the blind velvet worm (Leucopatus anophthalmus). It is found in northeast Tasmania, Australia, and is ovoviviparous.

The species was first described in 1991 as Tasmanipatus anophthalmus.

== Taxonomy ==
The generic name Leucopatus refers to the species' white colouration. The specific name anophthalmus refers to this species' lack of eyes.

== Description ==
The body is entirely white except for the tips of claws and jaws, which are dark brown. There are 15 pairs of oncopods. Adults are typically 25–30 mm (0.98–1.18 in) long, but may extend to 50 mm (2.0 in) while walking. Most distinctively, this species lacks eyes. Typical habitat is beneath stones and rotten logs in sclerophyllous forests and shrubland.

== Conservation ==
Leucopatus anophthalmus is listed as Endangered on the IUCN Red List.
