= Nodocapitus =

Scientific classification
- Kingdom: Animalia
- Phylum: Onychophora
- Family: Peripatopsidae
- Genus: Nodocapitus; Reid, 1996

Species
- See text

Genus of Peripatopsid velvet worms

Nodocapitus is a genus of velvet worms in the family Peripatopsidae. All species in this genus have 15 pairs of legs in both sexes. N. formosus is found in Queensland, Australia, N. inornatus is found in New South Wales, and N. barryi is found in both of these states. In each species, the males are distinguished by enlarged papillae on the head, between the antennae.

== Species ==
The genus contains the following species:

- Nodocapitus barryi Reid, 1996
- Nodocapitus formosus Reid, 1996
- Nodocapitus inornatus Reid, 1996
