= Leuropezos =

Scientific classification
- Kingdom: Animalia
- Phylum: Onychophora
- Family: Peripatopsidae
- Genus: Leuropezos; Reid, 1996
- Species: L. eungellensis

Binomial name
- Leuropezos eungellensis Reid, 1996

Genus and species of Peripatopsid velvet worm

Leuropezos is a monospecific genus of velvet worm containing the single species Leuropezos eungellensis. This species has 15 pairs of legs in both sexes. The type locality of this species is Eungella National Park, Queensland, Australia.
