= Minyplanetes =

Scientific classification
- Kingdom: Animalia
- Phylum: Onychophora
- Family: Peripatopsidae
- Genus: Minyplanetes; Reid, 1996
- Species: M. kroombensis

Binomial name
- Minyplanetes kroombensis Reid, 1996

Genus and species of Peripatopsid velvet worm

Minyplanetes is a monospecific genus of velvet worm containing the single species Minyplanetes kroombensis. This species has 15 pairs of legs in both sexes. The type locality of this species is Kroombit Tops, Queensland, Australia.
