= Tetrameraden =

Scientific classification
- Kingdom: Animalia
- Phylum: Onychophora
- Family: Peripatopsidae
- Genus: Tetrameraden; Reid, 1996
- Species: T. meringos

Binomial name
- Tetrameraden meringos Reid, 1996

Genus and species of Peripatopsid velvet worm

Tetrameraden is a monospecific genus of ovoviviparous velvet worm, containing the single species Tetrameraden meringos. This species has 15 pairs of legs in both sexes. The type locality of this species is the Warrumbungle Range, New South Wales, Australia.
