= Planipapillus =

Scientific classification
- Kingdom: Animalia
- Phylum: Onychophora
- Family: Peripatopsidae
- Genus: Planipapillus; Reid, 1996

Species
- See text

Genus of Peripatopsid velvet worms

Planipapillus is a genus of velvet worms in the family Peripatopsidae, whose species are found in eastern Victoria and southeastern New South Wales, Australia. They are unique in that the males of this genus may bear patches of reduced papillae on the head, posterior to the eyes; the generic name refers to this fact, and likewise they have been vernacularly referred to as lawn-headed onychophorans. All species in this genus are oviparous and have 15 pairs of legs.

== Species ==
The genus was erected in 1996 by Amanda L. Reid to accommodate four contemporarily described species, of which P. taylori was designated the type species. Reid described and assigned a further eight species to Planipapillus in 2000, and Douch and Reid described an additional species in 2023, producing the count of 13 species recognised today. These species are listed below:

- Planipapillus absonus Douch & Reid, 2023
- Planipapillus annae Reid, 2000
- Planipapillus berti Reid, 2000
- Planipapillus biacinaces Reid, 1996
- Planipapillus biacinoides Reid, 2000
- Planipapillus bulgensis Reid, 1996
- Planipapillus cyclus Reid, 2000
- Planipapillus gracilis Reid, 2000
- Planipapillus impacris Reid, 2000
- Planipapillus mundus Reid, 1996
- Planipapillus taylori Reid, 1996
- Planipapillus tectus Reid, 2000
- Planipapillus vittatus Reid, 2000
