= Regimitra =

Scientific classification
- Kingdom: Animalia
- Phylum: Onychophora
- Family: Peripatopsidae
- Genus: Regimitra; Reid, 1996
- Species: R. quadricaula

Binomial name
- Regimitra quadricaula Reid, 1996

Genus and species of Peripatopsid velvet worm

Regimitra is a monospecific genus of velvet worm containing the single species Regimitra quadricaula. This species is ovoviviparous. The males of this species have 15 pairs of legs, with the last pair fully developed; females have either 15 leg pairs, with the last pair clawed but reduced, or only 14 leg pairs, preceding a pair reduced to a lump without feet or claws. The type locality of this species is Tuggolo State Forest, New South Wales, Australia.
