= Dystactotylos =

Scientific classification
- Kingdom: Animalia
- Phylum: Onychophora
- Family: Peripatopsidae
- Genus: Dystactotylos; Reid, 1996
- Species: D. aletes

Binomial name
- Dystactotylos aletes Reid, 1996

Genus and species of Peripatopsid velvet worm

Dystactotylos is a monospecific genus of velvet worm containing the single species Dystactotylos aletes. This species has 15 pairs of legs in both sexes. The type locality of this species is Massey Range, Queensland, Australia.
