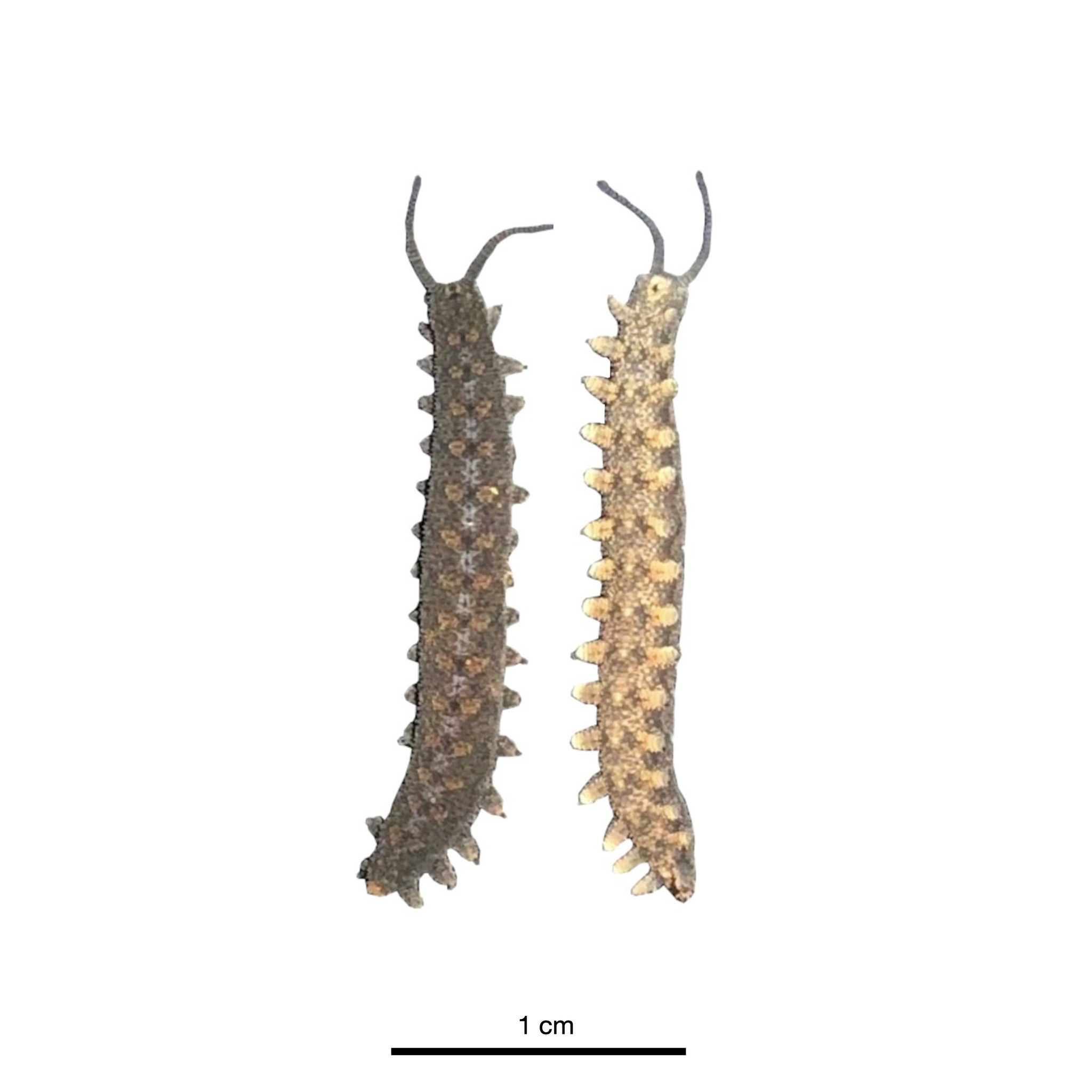

Scientific classification
- Kingdom: Animalia
- Phylum: Onychophora
- Family: Peripatopsidae
- Genus: Cephalofovea
- Species: C. tomahmontis

Binomial name
- Cephalofovea tomahmontis Ruhberg et al., 1988

= Cephalofovea tomahmontis =

Species of Peripatopsid velvet worm

Cephalofovea tomahmontis is a species of velvet worm in the Peripatopsidae family. This species is ovoviviparous, has 15 pairs of oncopods (legs), and lives in rotting logs and leaf litter. The type locality is Mount Tomah, New South Wales, Australia, after which this species is named. Like all members of the genus Cephalofovea, both sexes of C. tomahmontis have a furrow on the head, between the antennae, which the male everts to carry his spermatophore to the female.
