= Acanthokara =

Scientific classification
- Kingdom: Animalia
- Phylum: Onychophora
- Family: Peripatopsidae
- Genus: Acanthokara; Reid, 1996
- Species: A. kaputensis

Binomial name
- Acanthokara kaputensis Reid, 1996

Genus and species of Peripatopsid velvet worm

Acanthokara is a monospecific genus of ovoviviparous velvet worm, containing the single species Acanthokara kaputensis. This species has 15 pairs of legs in both sexes. The type locality of this species is Mount Kaputar, New South Wales, Australia.
