= Austroperipatus paradoxus =

Scientific classification
- Kingdom: Animalia
- Phylum: Onychophora
- Family: Peripatopsidae
- Genus: Austroperipatus
- Species: A. paradoxus

Binomial name
- Austroperipatus paradoxus (Bouvier, 1915)

Species of Peripatopsid velvet worm

Austroperipatus paradoxus is a species of velvet worm in the Peripatopsidae family. This species has 15 pairs of legs. Females of this species range from 7 mm to 80 mm in length, whereas males range from 6 mm to 36 mm.
