= Sphenoparme =

Sphenoparme hobwensis

Scientific classification
- Kingdom: Animalia
- Phylum: Onychophora
- Family: Peripatopsidae
- Genus: Sphenoparme; Reid, 1996
- Species: S. hobwensis

Binomial name
- Sphenoparme hobwensis Reid, 1996

Genus and species of Peripatopsid velvet worm

Sphenoparme is a monospecific genus of velvet worm containing the single species Sphenoparme hobwensis. This species has 15 pairs of legs in both sexes. The type locality of this species is Lamington National Park, Queensland, Australia.
