= Konothele =

Scientific classification
- Kingdom: Animalia
- Phylum: Onychophora
- Family: Peripatopsidae
- Genus: Konothele; Reid, 1996
- Species: K. kallimos

Binomial name
- Konothele kallimos Reid, 1996

Genus and species of Peripatopsid velvet worm

Konothele is a monospecific genus of velvet worm containing the single species Konothele kallimos. This species has 15 pairs of legs in both sexes. The type locality of this species is Mount Hemmant, Queensland, Australia.
