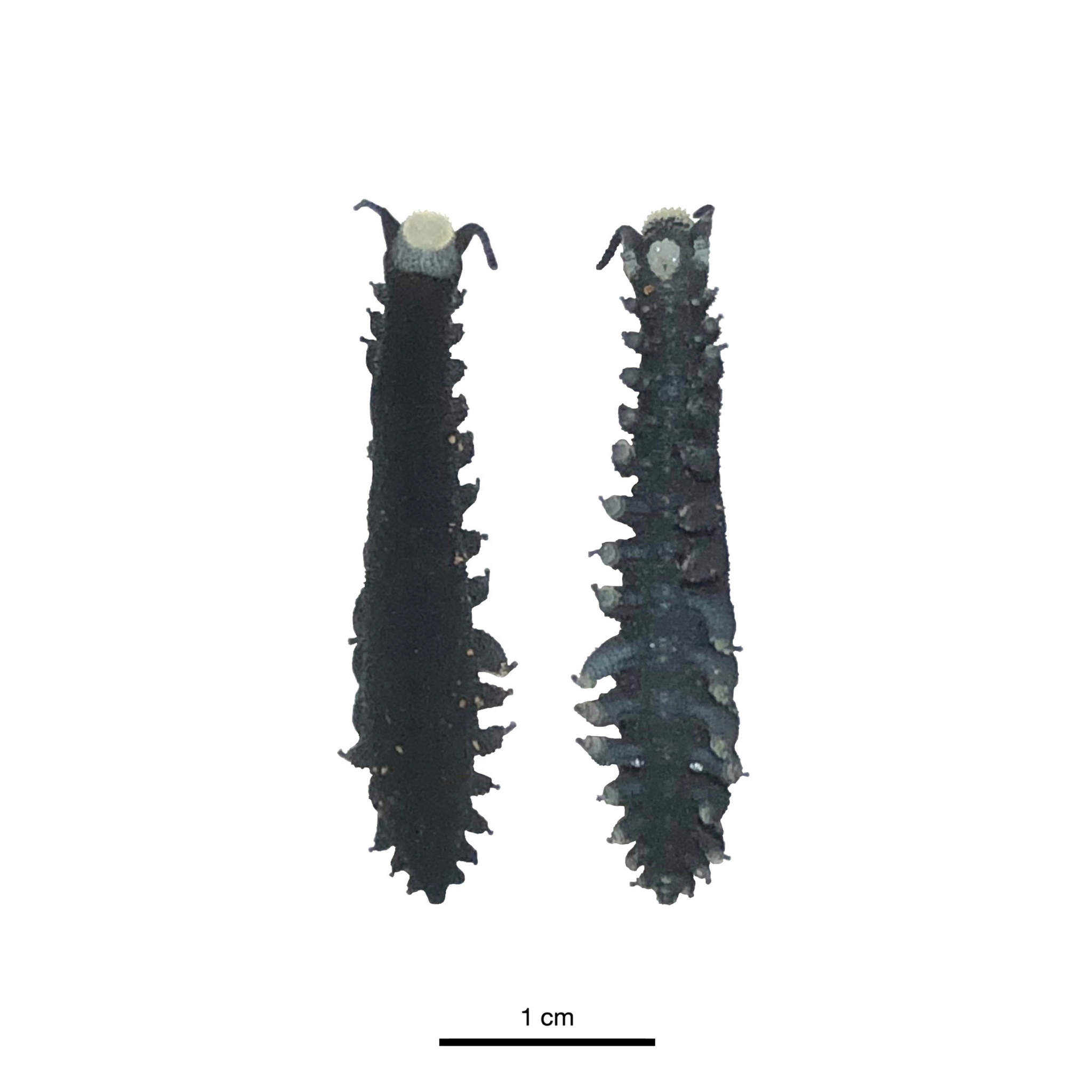
- Cephalofovea pavimenta

Scientific classification
- Kingdom: Animalia
- Phylum: Onychophora
- Family: Peripatopsidae
- Genus: Cephalofovea; Ruhberg et al., 1988

Type species
- Cephalofovea tomahmontis

Species
- See text

= Cephalofovea =

Genus of Peripatopsid velvet worms

Cephalofovea is a genus of velvet worms in the Peripatopsidae family. All species in this genus are ovoviviparous and have 15 pairs of oncopods (legs), and both sexes possess a pitted-head which the male everts and uses to pass his spermatophore to the female. They are found in New South Wales, Australia.

== Etymology ==
The name Cephalofovea is derived from Ancient Greek κεφαλή (kephalḗ), meaning head, and Latin fovea, meaning pit, in reference to the distinctive furrow on the head, between the antennae, which is distinctive of members of this genus.

== Species ==
The genus contains the following species:

- Cephalofovea cameroni Reid et al., 1995
- Cephalofovea clandestina Reid et al., 1995
- Cephalofovea pavimenta Reid et al., 1995
- Cephalofovea tomahmontis Ruhberg et al., 1988
