= Austroperipatus =

- Austroperipatus aequabilis

Scientific classification
- Kingdom: Animalia
- Phylum: Onychophora
- Family: Peripatopsidae
- Genus: Austroperipatus; Baehr, 1977

Species
- See text

Genus of Peripatopsid velvet worms

Austroperipatus is a genus of oviparous and ovoviviparous velvet worms in the family Peripatopsidae and the genus Austroperipatus. This genus has 15 pairs of legs in both sexes. The species in this genus are found in northern Queensland, Australia.

== Species ==
The genus contains the following species:

- Austroperipatus aequabilis Reid, 1996
- Austroperipatus eridelos Reid, 1996
- Austroperipatus paradoxus (Bouvier, 1915)
- Austroperipatus superbus Reid, 1996
