= Hylonomoipos =

Scientific classification
- Kingdom: Animalia
- Phylum: Onychophora
- Family: Peripatopsidae
- Genus: Hylonomoipos; Reid, 1996

Species
- See text

Genus of Peripatopsid velvet worms

Hylonomoipos is a genus of velvet worms in the family Peripatopsidae. All species in this genus have 15 pairs of legs in both sexes. They are found in southeastern Queensland, Australia.

== Species ==
The genus contains the following species:

- Hylonomoipos akares Reid, 1996
- Hylonomoipos brookensis Reid, 1996
