= Baeothele =

Scientific classification
- Kingdom: Animalia
- Phylum: Onychophora
- Family: Peripatopsidae
- Genus: Baeothele; Reid, 1996
- Species: B. saukros

Binomial name
- Baeothele saukros Reid, 1996

Genus and species of Peripatopsid velvet worm

Baeothele is a monospecific genus of ovoviviparous velvet worm containing the single species Baeothele saukros. This species has 15 pairs of legs in both sexes. The type locality of this species is Wollemi National Park, New South Wales, Australia.
