= Ruhbergia =

Scientific classification
- Kingdom: Animalia
- Phylum: Onychophora
- Family: Peripatopsidae
- Genus: Ruhbergia; Reid, 1996

Species
- See text

Genus of Peripatopsid velvet worms

Ruhbergia is a genus of velvet worms in the family Peripatopsidae. All species in this genus are ovoviviparous (with yolky ova) and have 15 pairs of legs in both sexes. They are found in New South Wales, Australia.

== Species ==
The genus contains the following species:

- Ruhbergia bifalcata Reid, 1996
- Ruhbergia brevicorna Reid, 1996
- Ruhbergia rostroides Reid, 1996
