= Ooperipatus oviparus =

Scientific classification
- Kingdom: Animalia
- Phylum: Onychophora
- Family: Peripatopsidae
- Genus: Ooperipatus
- Species: O. oviparus

Binomial name
- Ooperipatus oviparus (Dendy, 1895)

Species of egg-laying Peripatopsid velvet worm

Ooperipatus oviparus is a species of velvet worm in the Peripatopsidae family. Females of this species range from 4 mm to 60 mm in length, whereas males range from 4 mm to 20 mm. This species lays eggs and has 15 pairs of legs with claws. It is found in Victoria, Australia.
