= Wambalana =

Scientific classification
- Kingdom: Animalia
- Phylum: Onychophora
- Family: Peripatopsidae
- Genus: Wambalana; Reid, 1996
- Species: W. makrothele

Binomial name
- Wambalana makrothele Reid, 1996

Genus and species of Peripatopsid velvet worm

Wambalana is a monospecific genus of ovoviviparous velvet worms containing the single species Wambalana makrothele. This species has 15 pairs of legs in both sexes. The type locality of this species is Telegherry State Forest, New South Wales, Australia.
