= Critolaus (disambiguation) =

Critolaus of Phaselis (c. 200 – c. 118 BC) was a Greek philosopher.

- Critolaus (mythology), member of the Trojan royal family
- Critolaus (velvet worm), a genus of velvet worm
- Critolaos of Megalopolis (fl. 147 BC–146 BC), general of the Achaean League in ancient Greece
