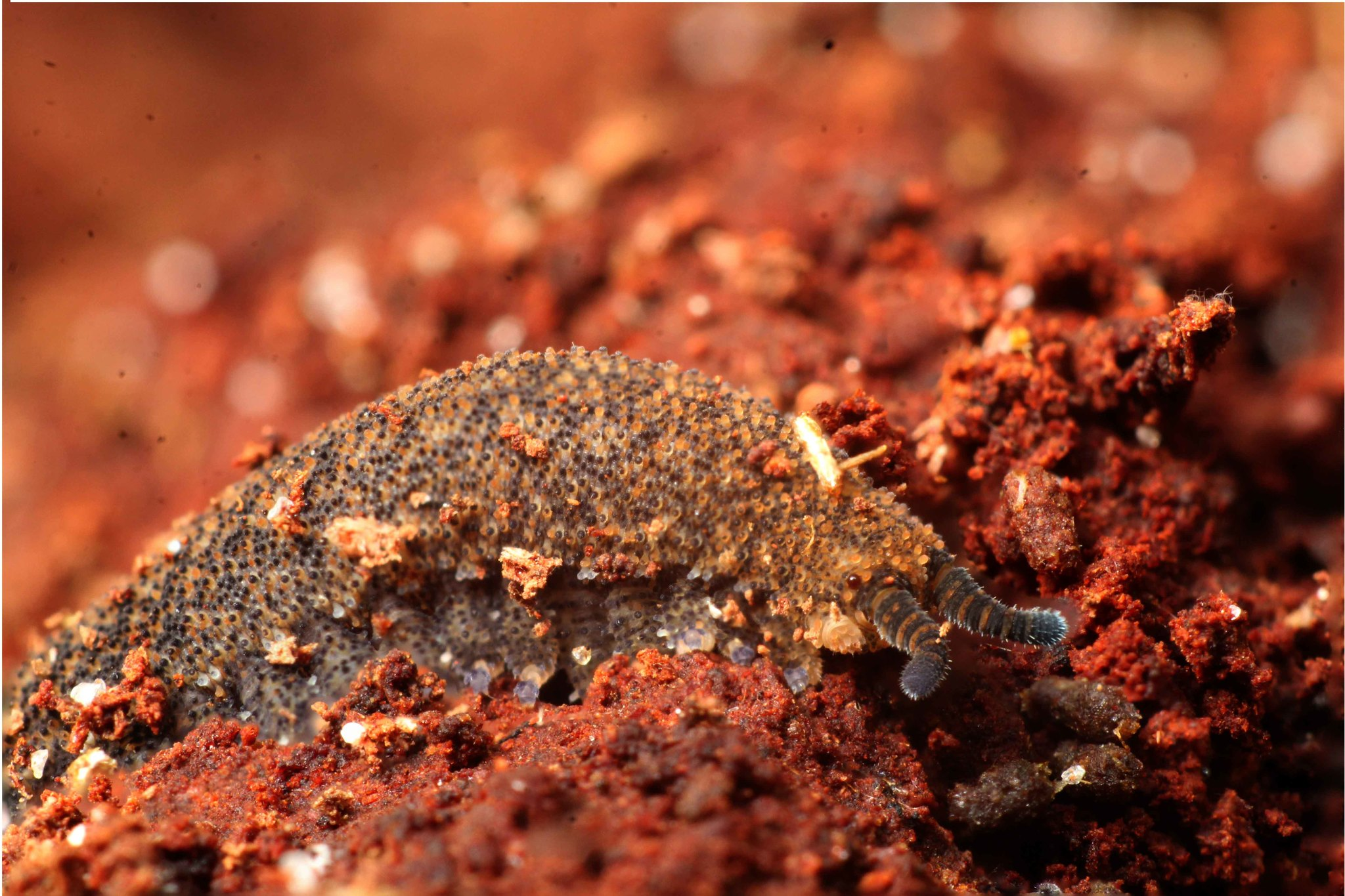

Scientific classification
- Kingdom: Animalia
- Phylum: Onychophora
- Family: Peripatopsidae
- Genus: Kumbadjena
- Species: K. extrema

Binomial name
- Kumbadjena extrema Sato, Buckman-Young, Harvey & Giribet, 2018

= Kumbadjena extrema =

Species of Peripatopsid velvet worm

Kumbadjena extrema is a species of velvet worm in the family Peripatopsidae. This species has 15 pairs of legs. The type locality is in Western Australia.
