= Diemenipatus mesibovi =

Scientific classification
- Kingdom: Animalia
- Phylum: Onychophora
- Family: Peripatopsidae
- Genus: Diemenipatus
- Species: D. mesibovi

Binomial name
- Diemenipatus mesibovi Oliveira, Ruhberg, Rowell & Mayer, 2018

Species of worm

Diemenipatus mesibovi is a species of viviparous velvet worm in the family Peripatopsidae. This species has 15 pairs of legs in both sexes. The type locality is in Tasmania.
