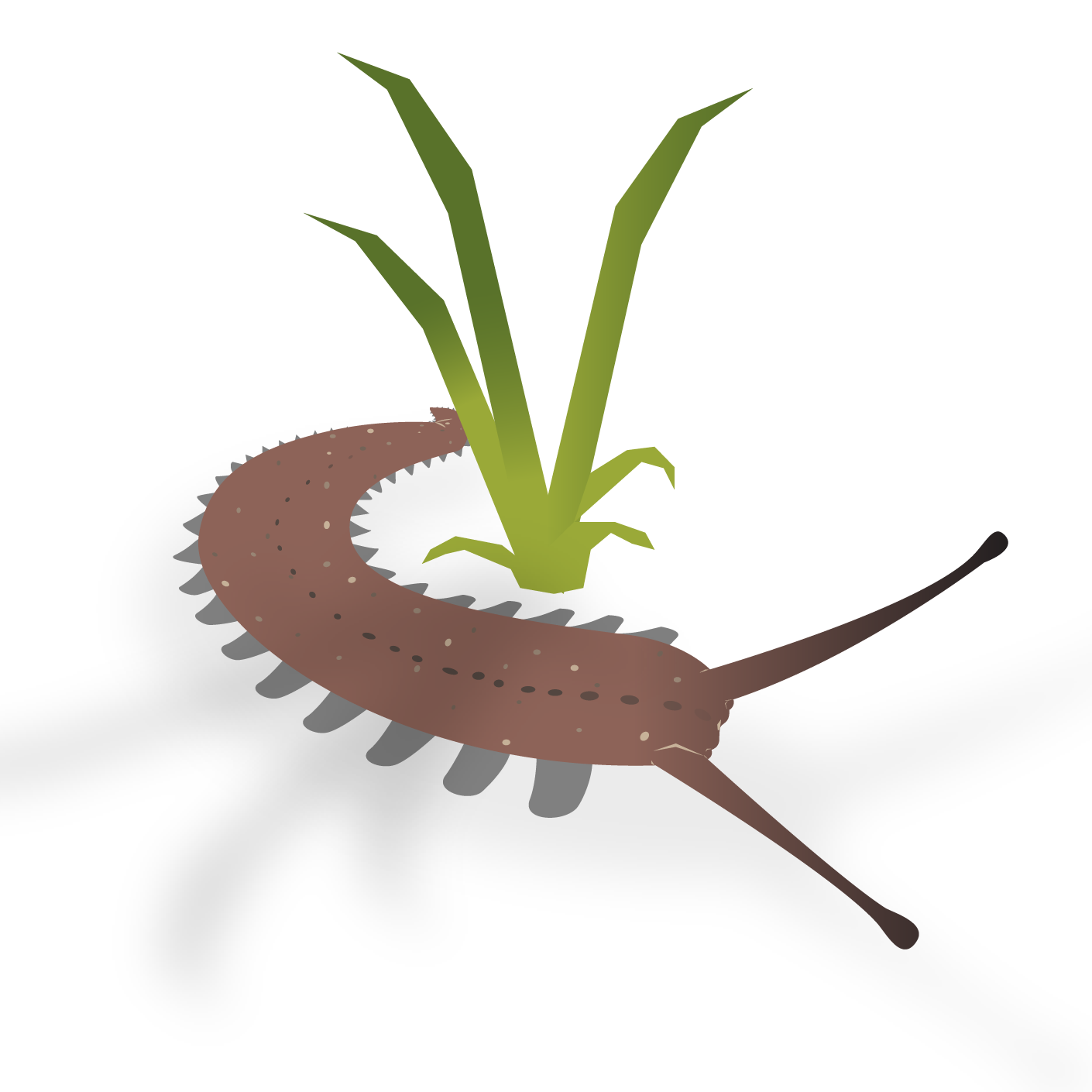
- Illustration

Scientific classification
- Kingdom: Animalia
- Phylum: Onychophora
- Family: Peripatopsidae
- Genus: Occiperipatoides; Ruhberg, 1985
- Species: O. gilesii

Binomial name
- Occiperipatoides gilesii (Spencer, 1909)

= Occiperipatoides =

Genus and species of Peripatopsid velvet worm

Occiperipatoides is a monospecific genus of velvet worm containing the single species Occiperipatoides gilesii. This genus is ovoviviparous and found in Western Australia. The genus is part of the ancient phylum Onychophora that contains soft-bodied, many-legged relatives of arthropods known commonly as velvet worms.

== Characteristics ==
Occiperipatoides gilesii has a unique combination of features that differentiate it from other members of the family Peripatopsidae found in Western Australia. It has 16 pairs of oncopods, unstructured appendages with a stubby appearance, that are mostly uniform in size. The skin of the velvet worm is covered with papillae that are cylindrical in shape and more elongated in comparison to closely related West Australian species in the genus Kumbadjena. These papillae are covered in ribbed scales that give the skin a velvety appearance. O. gilesii also exhibits a ridge-like structure that segments the papillae at the first oncopod pair. The underside of the body in Australian Onychophorans displays repeated pairs of posteriorly situated ventral and anteriorly situated pre-ventral organs at each oncopod segment. These pairs arise during development when segmental hardenings occur in the tissue of an embryo and serve to attach limb depressor muscles to the body in adulthood. Antenna are present and are composed of 30 antennal rings that widen to form sensory pads at their base. Colouration differs between specimens but has been described as ranging from tan to greyish-blue. O. gilesii is sexually dimorphic, with the larger females ranging in length from 7-46mm and the smaller males between 5-31mm.

=== Glands ===
Males of the species possess a posterior accessory gland. A long crural gland extending into the body cavity is present in both sexes. In females the crural gland is irregular in its occurrence and does not have a set position, whereas it always occurs in males and is located at the first oncopod pair. Crural glands in Peripatopsidae species play a role in emitting sex pheromones. These pheromones allow velvet worms to find potential mates in the absence of sound generating/receiving structures and poorly adapted eyes. Slime glands common to Onychophoran species occur in O. gilesii, where they perform important physiological functions in regards to hunting and feeding. A sticky secretion is produced in the glands that is ejected onto prey via oral papillae, trapping it for the velvet worm to consume. The slime itself is stored in reservoirs that make up a significant amount of the worm's total bodyweight (up to 11% in some Australian species).

== Taxonomy ==
Occiperipatoides gilesii was first identified and named by Baldwin Spencer in 1909 and the genus Occiperipatoides was later defined by Hilke Ruhberg as monospecific in 1985. Before this reclassification by Ruhberg, Occiperipatoides was thought to include the species Occiperipatoides occidentalis (now Kumbadjena occidentalis). Recent genetic studies have shown a similar difference in genetics between the two species to that observed between genera, with 81% of gene loci being incongruent between them. The taxonomic relationships between Australian peripatopsid species are generally not well understood and the discovery of significant levels of interspecific allozyme diversity, as exemplified by the case of the Occiperipatoides genus, as well as unusual physiological modifications in the family may warrant revision of current classifications.

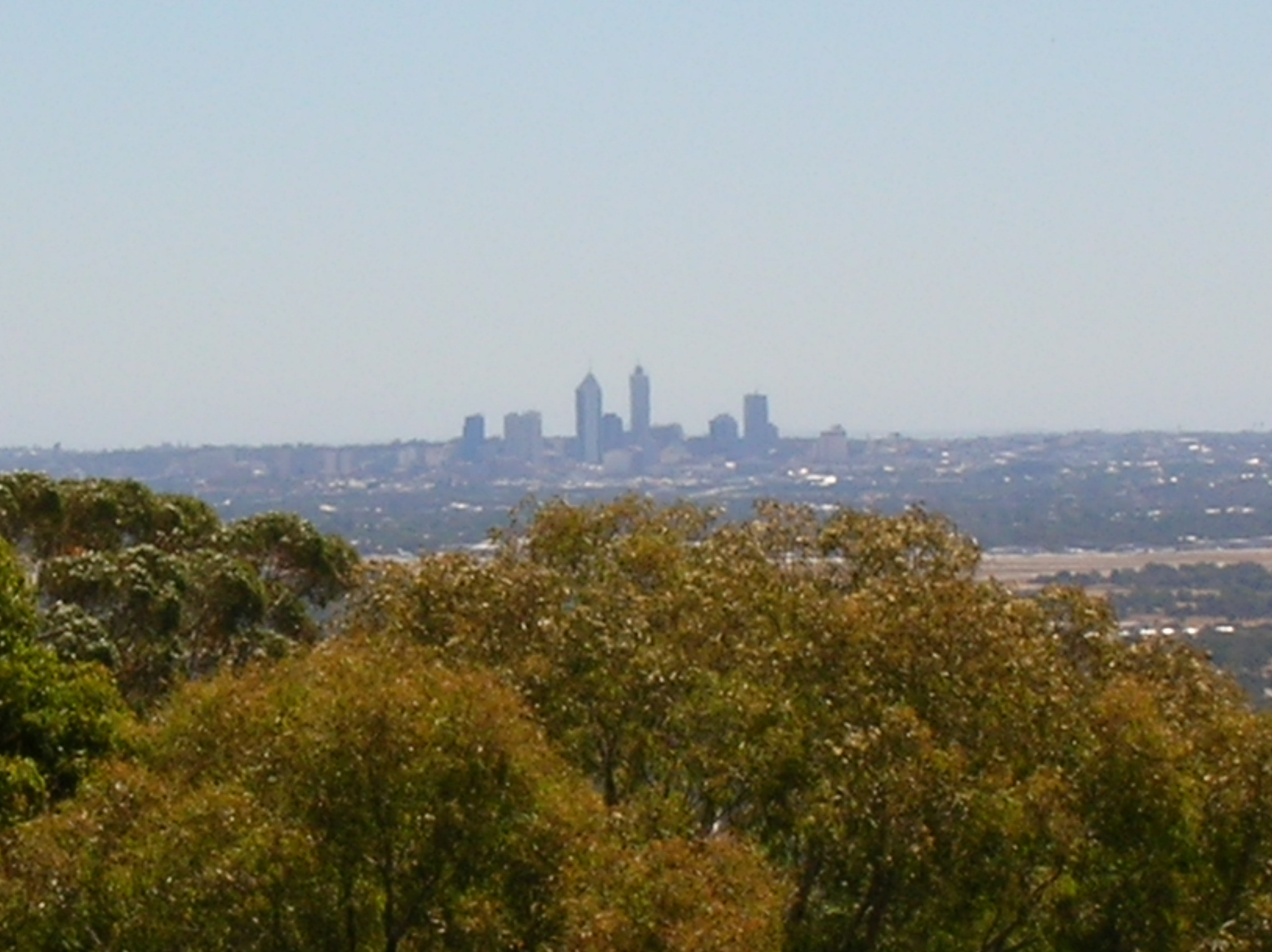
A view of the Swan Coastal Plain from the Darling Scarp

== Distribution ==
Occiperipatoides gilesii is primarily found in banksia and eucalypt dominated bush with relatively low rainfall in comparison to areas preferred by other members of the Peripatopsidae family. Most samples of the species have been collected in the Perth Basin, which stretches from the Swan Coastal Plain to the Darling Scarp. Its occurrence in this area has been noted as widespread by the Environmental Protection Authority of Western Australia. The range of O. gilesii receives most of its rainfall in winter months and it was in that period that the most specimens were observed during a survey conducted in 2002.

=== Speciation ===
Occiperipatoides gilesii is considered to be part of the south-west Australian biodiversity hotspot, an area populated with many varieties of endemic flora and fauna. It is, along with other West Australian Onychophora, believed to represent relictual lineages of species that lived in the Mesozoic epoch. Short range endemism in the biodiversity hotspot comes as a result of climatic change in Australia during the Miocene that shrunk mesic habitats by the process of aridification, limiting ecologically diverse faunal communities to the eastern coast and south-west of the continent. This, combined with the geographical isolation of Australia and the large period of time that has elapsed since it detached from Gondwana, has made O. gilesii evolutionarily primitive in comparison to Onychophorans found in South America and Asia. Periods of evolutionary isolation have also made populations of Peripatopsidae in south-west Australia highly disjointed although samples of O. gilesii reflect low rates of genetic diversity.

== Threats to habitat ==
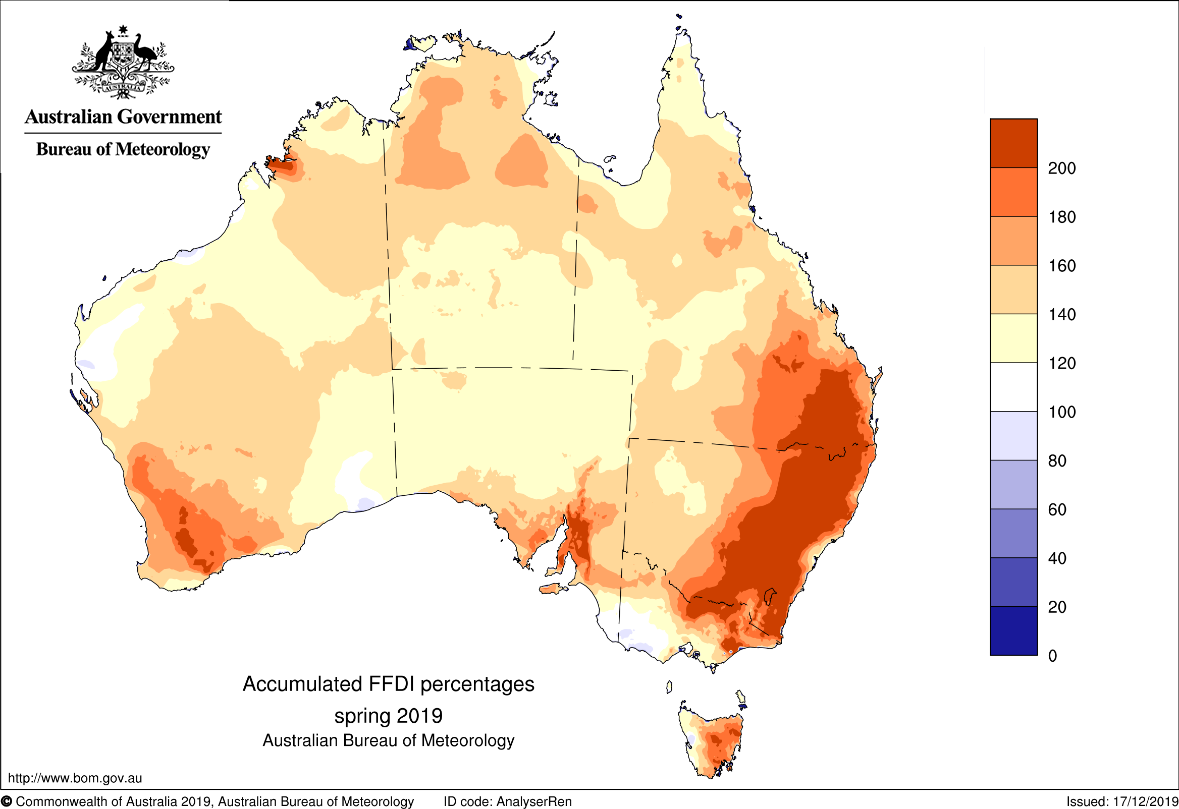
BOM fire danger ratings across Australia in 2019 showing significant danger in the south-western biodiversity hotspot

Despite the significant presence of O. gilesii across its range, the proximity of Perth to major populations of the species presents a threat to their health as urban encroachment destroys forest undergrowth. Debris from logging activities can increase the habitability of an area for O. gilesii in the short term. Once the initial plant matter from clearing has decayed, however, forest regrowth will not be sufficient to supply a sustainable amount of undergrowth cover for the species. Carefully planned, sustainable forestry practices are therefore recommended to preserve O. gilesii habitats. The effects of increasingly severe Australian wildfire seasons fueled by climate change, that in 2019-2020 alone wiped out more than 10 million hectares of land of which 80% was native forest, are also potentially harmful to O. gilesii habitats. The impact of fire on invertebrates in Australia is not well understood due to a lack of scientific research and a classification rate of only about 30% among relevant taxa. However, a study conducted by the Western Australian Department of Parks and Wildlife found that no O. gilesii were collected for 17 years after undergrowth in a survey area was burned by wildfire.

== Behaviour ==
=== Habits ===
Occiperipatoides gilesii, like other West Australian velvet worms, relies heavily on plant litter and forest undergrowth for protection. Surveys of Australian Onychophoran species have shown that water absorbing, decaying logs are a particularly important component of forest floor habitats. A positive correlation exists between increase in age and volume of logs and the likelihood of inhabitance by velvet worms. The health of O. gilesii populations is also closely tied to rainfall patterns as they have no physiological mechanism for the retention of moisture and are prone to desiccation. Although relatively little is known about the behaviour of O. gilesii specifically, studies conducted on other Australian Peripatopsidae show that their brains include similar "mushroom structures" to those found in arthropods that are believed to play a role in enabling complex behaviors. These behaviours include group hunting, formation of social hierarchies and intraspecific aggression.

=== Reproduction ===
Male O. gilesii lack spermatophore carrying papillae adjacent to the eyes, a feature common in other Australian Ochynophorans, and the method of sperm transfer that they employ is not definitively known. Females possess a large spermatheca and a cross shaped gonopore. The purpose of the spermatheca is to store sperm before it moves through the reproductive tract and fertilizes eggs that go on to form embryotic juveniles in the uterus. In other Australian Peripatopsidae the sperm is admitted to the spermatheca by means of deposit of the spermatophore on the skin of the female, where it breaks through into the body cavity. Broods are often of multiple paternity as different males deposit spermatophores on the skin of the female, a process that may increase genetic diversity of species with confined ranges like O. gilesii. Due to O. gilesii's lack of spermatophore-transferring head structures, it has been theorized that dermal insemination may instead be achieved by use of a spiked appendage, or that sperm may be deposited via the vaginal opening. Members of the Peripatopsidae family such as O. gilesii have longer female maturation times, frequently entering into diapause, but higher fecundity than tropical velvet worms. This species exhibits lecithotrophic ovoviviparity; that is, mothers in this species produce and retain yolky eggs in their uteri. Juveniles are born in the autumn between March and April. Juveniles have fewer papillae than adults, due to an absence of secondary and accessory papillae that develop by the time of maturation, but are born with their full complement of oncopods.
