= Centrorumis =

Scientific classification
- Kingdom: Animalia
- Phylum: Onychophora
- Family: Peripatopsidae
- Genus: Centrorumis; Reid, 1996
- Species: C. trigona

Binomial name
- Centrorumis trigona Reid, 1996

Genus and species of Peripatopsid velvet worm

Centrorumis is a monospecific genus of velvet worm containing the single species Centrorumis trigona. This species has 15 pairs of legs in both sexes. It is found in New South Wales, Australia.
