= Dactylothele =

Scientific classification
- Kingdom: Animalia
- Phylum: Onychophora
- Family: Peripatopsidae
- Genus: Dactylothele; Reid, 1996
- Species: D. habros

Binomial name
- Dactylothele habros Reid, 1996

Genus and species of Peripatopsid velvet worm

Dactylothele is a monospecific genus of velvet worm containing the single species Dactylothele habros. This species has 15 pairs of legs in both sexes. The type locality of this species is Nothofagus Mountain in the Kyogle Council, New South Wales, Australia, near the Queensland border.
