= Aktinothele =

Scientific classification
- Kingdom: Animalia
- Phylum: Onychophora
- Family: Peripatopsidae
- Genus: Aktinothele; Reid, 1996
- Species: A. eucharis

Binomial name
- Aktinothele eucharis Reid, 1996

Genus and species of Peripatopsid velvet worm

Aktinothele is a monospecific genus of oviparous velvet worm, containing the single species Aktinothele eucharis. This species has 15 pairs of legs in both sexes. The type locality of this species is Finch Hatton Gorge, Queensland, Australia.
