= Vescerro =

Scientific classification
- Kingdom: Animalia
- Phylum: Onychophora
- Family: Peripatopsidae
- Genus: Vescerro; Reid, 1996
- Species: V. turbinatus

Binomial name
- Vescerro turbinatus Reid, 1996

Genus and species of Peripatopsid velvet worm

Vescerro is a monospecific genus of ovoviviparous velvet worm containing the single species Vescerro turbinatus. This species has 15 pairs of legs in both sexes. The type locality of this species is the Iron Range, Queensland, Australia.
