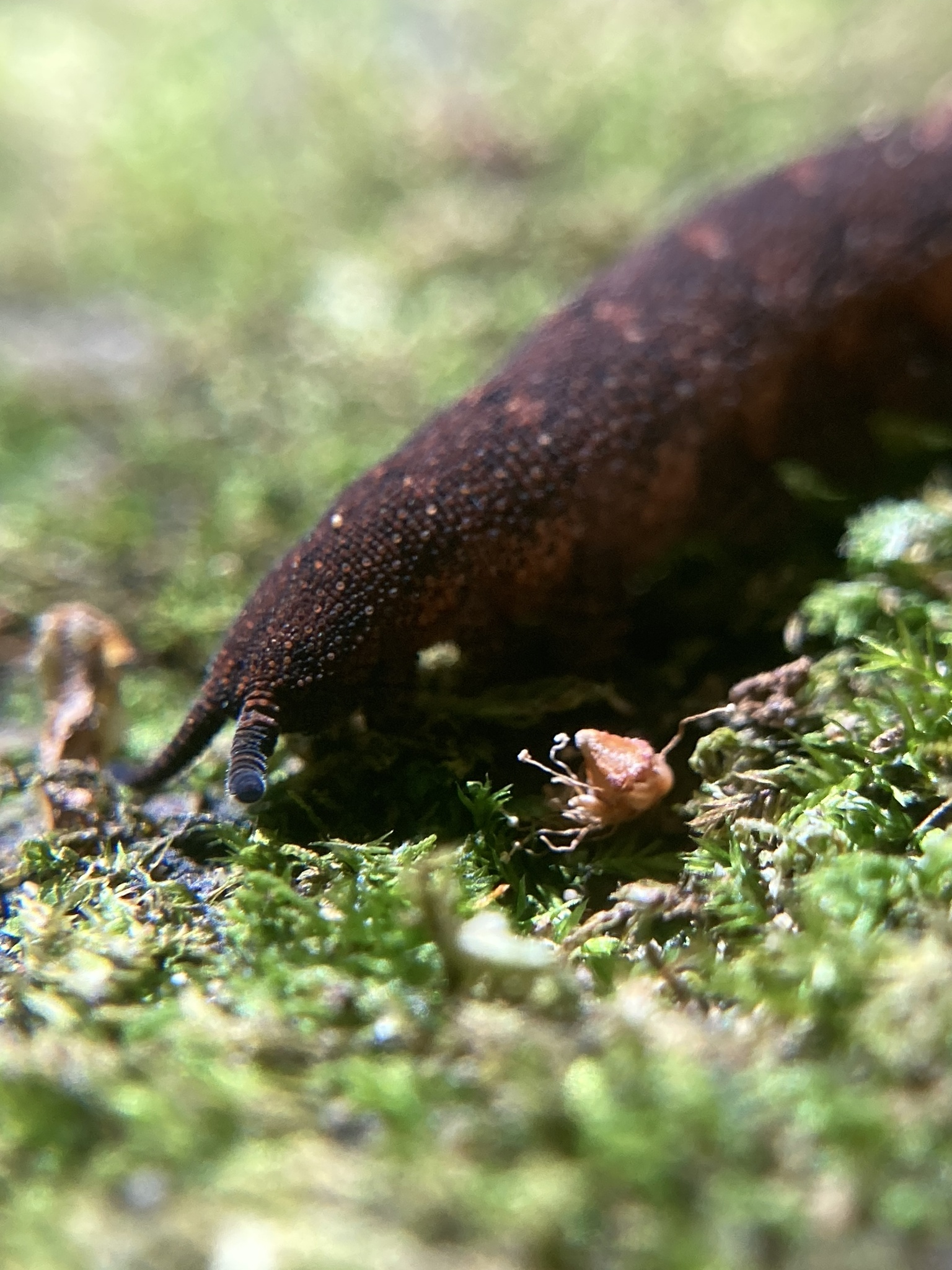

Scientific classification
- Kingdom: Animalia
- Phylum: Onychophora
- Family: Peripatopsidae
- Genus: Anoplokaros; Reid, 1996
- Species: A. keerensis

Binomial name
- Anoplokaros keerensis Reid, 1996

= Anoplokaros =

Genus and species of Peripatopsid velvet worm

Anoplokaros is a monospecific genus of ovoviviparous velvet worm containing the single species Anoplokaros keerensis. This species has 15 pairs of legs in both sexes. The type locality of this species is Mount Keira, New South Wales, Australia.
