= Paropisthopatus =

Scientific classification
- Kingdom: Animalia
- Phylum: Onychophora
- Family: Peripatopsidae
- Genus: Paropisthopatus; Ruhberg, 1985
- Species: P. umbrinus

Binomial name
- Paropisthopatus umbrinus (Johow, 1911)

Synonyms
- Peripatus (Peripatopsis) umbrinus (Johow 1911); Metaperipatus umbrinus (Clark, 1915)

Genus and species of basal Peripatopsid velvet worm

Paropisthopatus is a monospecific genus of velvet worm containing the single species Paropisthopatus umbrinus. Females of this species range from 20 mm to 70 mm in length. The type locality is in central Chile. Velvet worms in this genus have 16 pairs of legs. This genus exhibits matrotrophic viviparity, that is, mothers in this genus retain eggs in their uteri and supply nourishment to their embryos, but without any placenta.

A second species assigned to this genus, Paropisthopatus costesi (Gravier & Fage, 1925), is considered a nomen dubium by Oliveira et al., 2012.
