= Critolaus lepidus =

Scientific classification
- Kingdom: Animalia
- Phylum: Onychophora
- Family: Peripatopsidae
- Genus: Critolaus; Reid, 1996
- Species: C. lepidus

Binomial name
- Critolaus lepidus Reid, 1996

Genus and species of Peripatopsid velvet worm

Critolaus is a monospecific genus of velvet worm containing the single species Critolaus lepidus. This species has 15 pairs of legs in both sexes. The type locality of this species is Kroombit Tops, Queensland, Australia.
