= Kumbadjena occidentalis =

Scientific classification
- Kingdom: Animalia
- Phylum: Onychophora
- Family: Peripatopsidae
- Genus: Kumbadjena
- Species: K. occidentalis

Binomial name
- Kumbadjena occidentalis (J. J. Fletcher, 1895)

Synonyms
- Peripatus leuckarti var. occidentalis (J. J. Fletcher, 1895); Peripatoides occidentalis (Dakin, 1920)

Species of Peripatopsid velvet worm

Kumbadjena occidentalis is a species of velvet worm in the family Peripatopsidae described by Joseph James Fletcher in 1895. This species has 15 pairs of legs. The type locality is in Western Australia.
