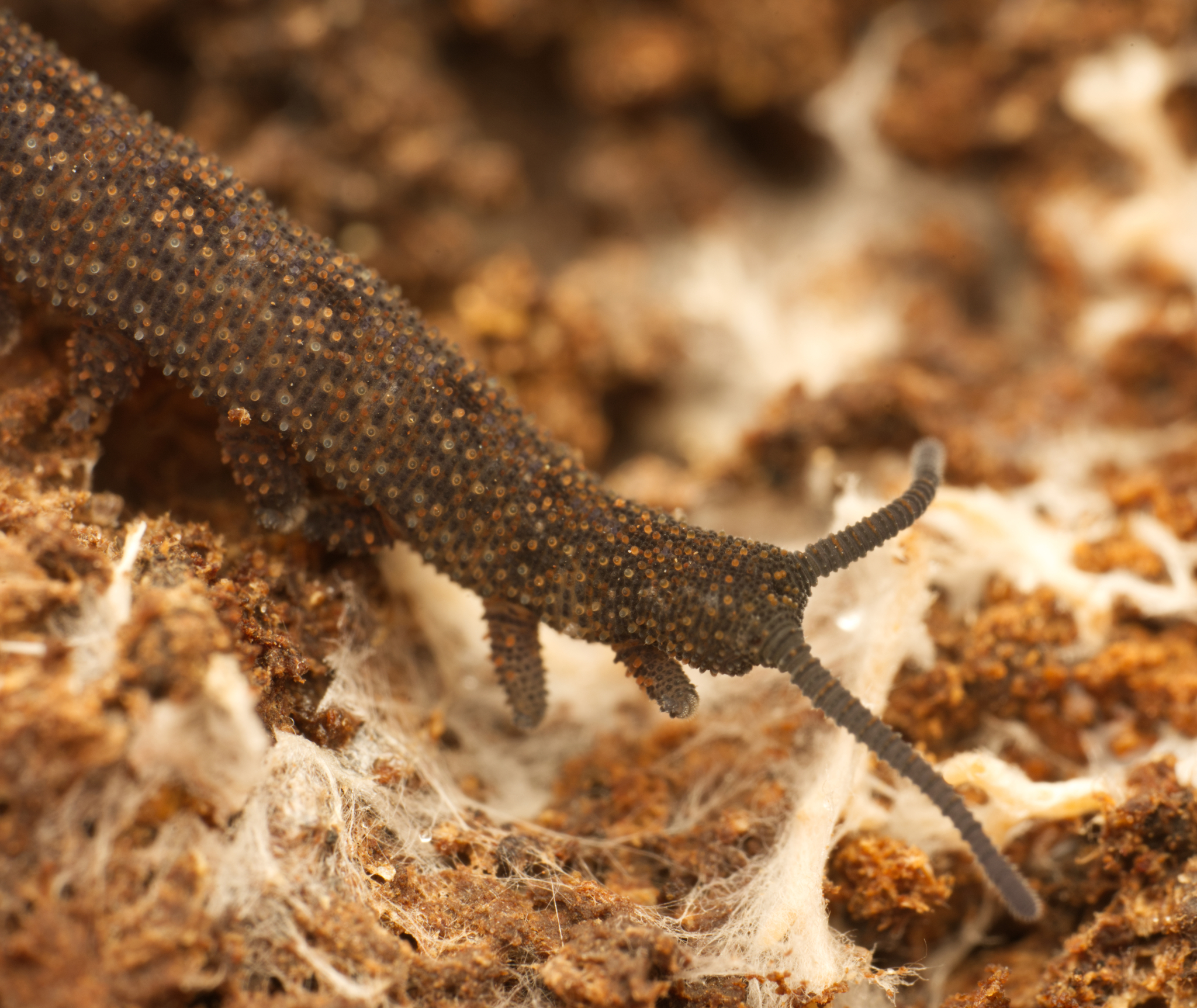

Scientific classification
- Kingdom: Animalia
- Phylum: Onychophora
- Family: Peripatopsidae
- Genus: Phallocephale; Reid, 1996
- Species: P. tallagandensis

Binomial name
- Phallocephale tallagandensis Reid, 1996

= Phallocephale =

Phallocephale tallagandensis

Genus and species of velvet worm

Phallocephale is a monospecific genus of ovoviviparous velvet worm containing the single species Phallocephale tallagandensis. Males are distinguished by the presence of an eversible knoblike structure on the head, whereas females instead have a depression on their head. This species has 15 pairs of legs in both sexes. The type locality of this species is Tallaganda National Park, New South Wales, Australia. This species exhibits lecithotrophic ovoviviparity; that is, mothers in this species retain yolky eggs in their uteri.

== Etymology ==
The name of the genus is derived from the Greek phallos (meaning penis) and kephale (meaning head), referring to the structure present on the heads of males of this species. The specific epithet refers to Tallaganda National Park, where this species was discovered.
