= Ooperipatus =

Scientific classification
- Kingdom: Animalia
- Phylum: Onychophora
- Family: Peripatopsidae
- Genus: Ooperipatus; Dendy, 1900

Species
- See text

Genus of egg-laying Peripatopsid velvet worms

Ooperipatus is a genus of velvet worms in the family Peripatopsidae. They are found in Australia. All species in this genus are oviparous and have 15 pairs of lobopods (legs).

== Species ==
The genus contains the following species:

- Ooperipatus birrgus Reid, 2000
- Ooperipatus caesius Reid, 2000
- Ooperipatus centunculus Reid, 1996
- Ooperipatus costatus Reid, 1996
- Ooperipatus hispidus Reid, 1996
- Ooperipatus lepidus Reid, 2000
- Ooperipatus nebulosus Reid, 2000
- Ooperipatus oviparus (Dendy, 1895)
- Ooperipatus porcatus Reid, 2000
- Ooperipatus pulchellus Reid, 1996
- Ooperipatus silvanus Reid, 2000
