= Florelliceps =

Scientific classification
- Kingdom: Animalia
- Phylum: Onychophora
- Family: Peripatopsidae
- Genus: Florelliceps; Tait & Norman, 2001
- Species: F. stutchburyae

Binomial name
- Florelliceps stutchburyae Tait & Norman, 2001

Genus and species of Peripatopsid velvet worm

Florelliceps is a monospecific genus of ovoviviparous velvet worm containing the single species Florelliceps stutchburyae. This species is brown with 15 pairs of oncopods (legs). During mating, the male of this species uses a structure on his head to place a spermatophore on the gonopore of the female. The type locality is Mount Warning, New South Wales, Australia.
