= Aethrikos =

Scientific classification
- Kingdom: Animalia
- Phylum: Onychophora
- Family: Peripatopsidae
- Genus: Aethrikos; Reid, 1996
- Species: A. setosa

Binomial name
- Aethrikos setosa Reid, 1996

Genus and species of Peripatopsid velvet worm

Aethrikos is a monospecific genus of ovoviviparous velvet worm, containing the single species Aethrikos setosa. This species has 15 pairs of legs in both sexes. This species exhibits lecithotrophic ovoviviparity; that is, mothers in this species retain yolky eggs in their uteri. The type locality of this species is Styx River State Forest, New South Wales, Australia.
