= Mantonipatus =

Scientific classification
- Kingdom: Animalia
- Phylum: Onychophora
- Family: Peripatopsidae
- Genus: Mantonipatus; Ruhberg, 1985
- Species: M. persiculus

Binomial name
- Mantonipatus persiculus Ruhberg, 1985

Genus and species of Peripatopsid velvet worm

Mantonipatus is a monospecific genus of velvet worm containing the single species Mantonipatus persiculus. Females of this species range from 8 mm to 33 mm in length, whereas males range from 8 mm to 20 mm. This species has 15 pairs of oncopods (legs) and has a limited distribution in the Southern Mount Lofty Ranges of South Australia. It is found in remnant native stringybark (Eucalyptus baxteri) forest.
