= Tallaganda National Park =

National park in Australia

Coordinates: 35°44′37″S 149°28′53″E

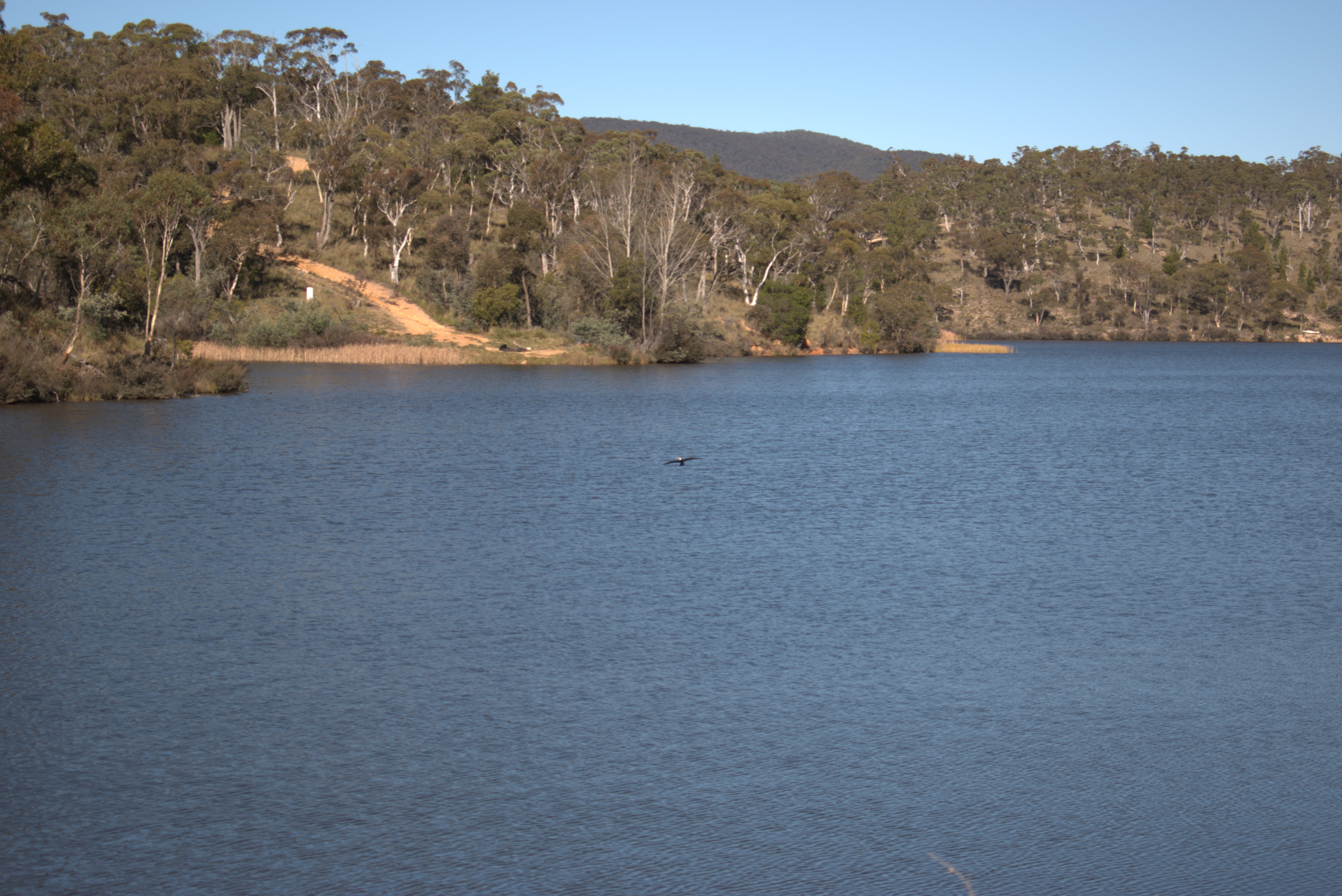
Captains Flat dammed lake

Tallaganda is a national park in New South Wales, Australia.

The national park gives its name to Phallocephale tallagandensis, a species of velvet worm that is known to occur there.

Tallaganda offers many opportunities for rest and recreation. It is utilised for bushwalking, camping, mountain biking, orienteering, and 4WD touring. Many animals have found their home here. This is a habitat for greater gliders, sugar gliders, eastern pygmy possums, as well as for the 55 bird species recorded here.

== See also ==
- Protected areas of New South Wales
