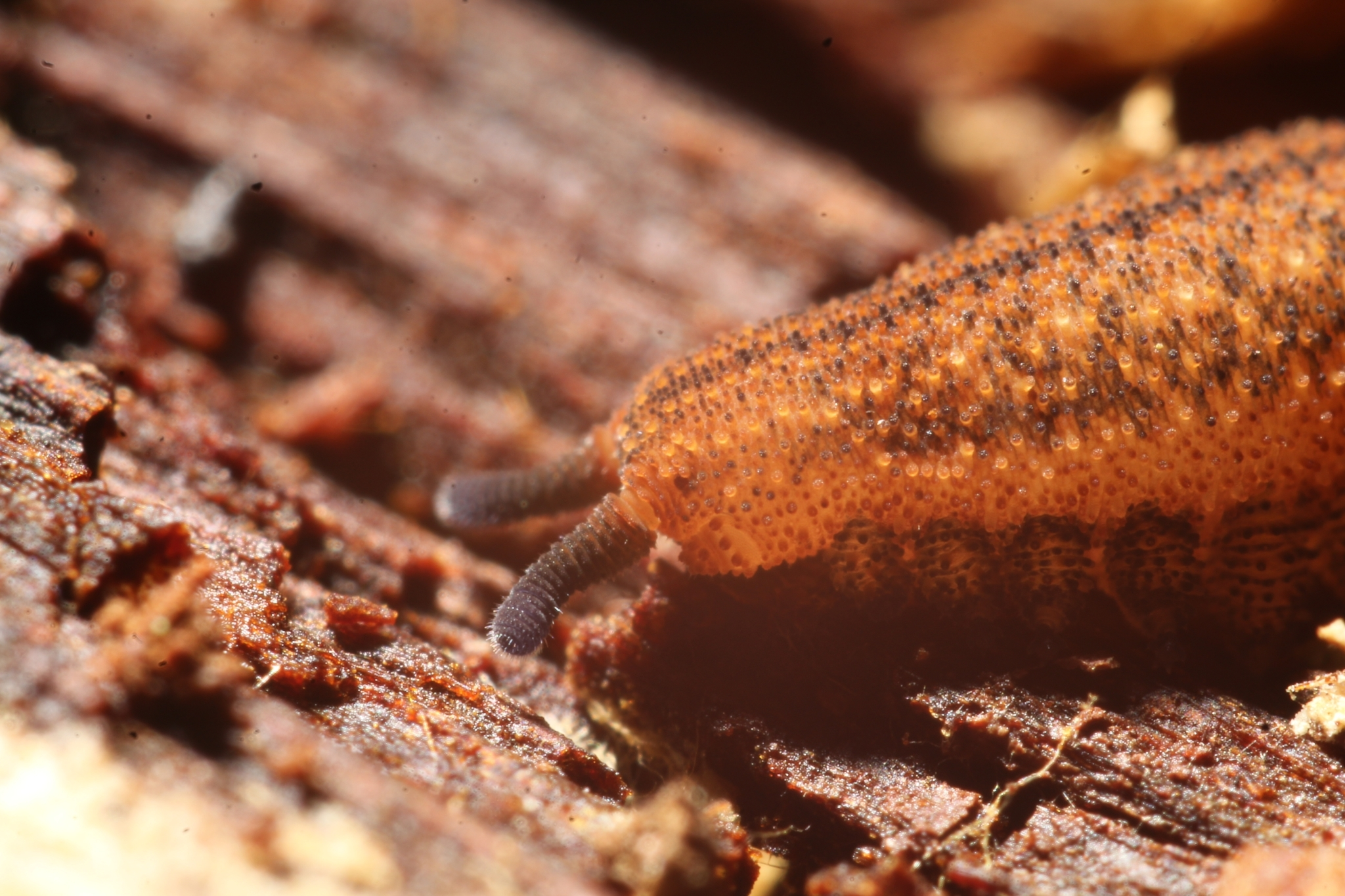
- Kumbadjena kaata

Scientific classification
- Kingdom: Animalia
- Phylum: Onychophora
- Family: Peripatopsidae
- Genus: Kumbadjena; Reid, 2002

Species
- See text

= Kumbadjena =

Genus of Peripatopsid velvet worm

Kumbadjena is a genus of velvet worms in the family Peripatopsidae. All species in this genus are ovoviviparous, all have 15 pairs of oncopods (legs), and all are found in the southwest of Western Australia.

== Species ==
The genus contains the following species:

- Kumbadjena extrema Sato, Buckman-Young, Harvey & Giribet, 2018
- Kumbadjena kaata Reid, 2002
- Kumbadjena karricola Sato, Buckman-Young, Harvey & Giribet, 2018
- Kumbadjena occidentalis (Fletcher, 1895)
- Kumbadjena shannonensis Reid, 2002
- Kumbadjena toolbrunupensis Sato, Buckman-Young, Harvey & Giribet, 2018
