= Metaperipatus =

Scientific classification
- Kingdom: Animalia
- Phylum: Onychophora
- Family: Peripatopsidae
- Genus: Metaperipatus; Clark, 1913
- Species: M. inae

Binomial name
- Metaperipatus inae Mayer, 2007

Genus of basal Peripatopsid velvet worms

Metaperipatus is a genus of velvet worms in the family Peripatopsidae that contains two species found in Chile, including Metaperipatus inae. This genus was created by the American zoologist Austin Hobart Clark in 1913 to contain the type species, M. blainvillei. Authorities believe M. blainvillei is a species complex, however, and some consider M. blainvillei a nomen dubium.

== Discovery ==
The velvet worm M. blainvillei was first described in 1837 by the French entomologist Paul Gervais. He named this species Venilia blainvillei after the French zoologist Henri Marie Ducrotay de Blainville. The precise type locality is unknown, however, and the type material has been lost, leading some authorities to deem M. blainvillei a nomen dubium.

The species M. inae was first described in 2007 by the German biologist Georg Mayer, who named this species after his wife, Ina Mayer, who found the first specimen. Mayer based the original description of M. inae on specimens collected from rotting logs and under moss in a forest near Contulmo in Chile in 2004. The holotype for M. inae is deposited in the Museo Zoológico de la Universidad de Concepción, Concepción, Chile.

== Description ==
Velvet worms in this genus have 19 to 22 pairs of legs, with the last pair clawed. The last leg pair is greatly reduced, with legs only about half as long as the preceding pair. The last pair of legs are also directed posteriorly and not used in locomotion. The soles of the feet feature four pads, with the fourth pad fragmented and much narrower than the other pads. The nephridial tubercles on the fourth and fifth leg pairs are located in the middle of the third pad. The feet feature three or four distal papillae, which can vary in their position. The gonopore is located between the last pair of legs. In the male, the gonopore is cruciform with four genital pads. The females lack an ovipositor but feature genital pads. In both M. inae and M. blainvillei, the gonopore in the female is also cruciform.

The number of legs in M. inae is fixed by species but sexually dimorphic: Males have 20 pairs of legs, whereas females have 22 leg pairs. The number of legs in M. blainvillei, however, varies within each sex: Males have 19 to 22 leg pairs, whereas females have 20 to 22 pairs. Authors have assigned specimens to M. blainvillei from a wide area, and the unusual variation in leg number in specimens from different locations leads authorities to suspect that M. blainvillei is a species complex.

The species M. inae is a dark grayish blue in color, with large irregular orange/red spots consisting of numerous orange/red dermal papillae. M. blainvillei is also dark grayish blue, but speckled with single orange/red papillae that are scattered more evenly across the body. The species M. inae is also larger than M. blainvillei: When females of the species M. inae are walking, they can be as long as 85 mm, and males can be as long as 60 mm. Specimens of M. blainvillei, however, reach a maximum length of 65 mm for females and 40 mm for males.

In adults of the species M. inae, the outer blade of the jaw features a large single tooth with one or two accessory teeth, and the inner blade features a large single tooth with seven to ten accessory teeth and no diastema. Juveniles begin with no accessory tooth on the outer blade and only five accessory teeth on the inner blade. In M. blainvillei, the outer blade features only one delicate accessory tooth, and the inner blade features four to eight accessory teeth with no diastema.

== Reproduction ==
Both M. inae and M. blainvillei reproduce using dermal insemination. Males of both species deposit spermatophores on the surface of the females' bodies. Authorities believe that dermal insemination allows sperm to bypass the embryos developing in the female genital tract that would otherwise obstruct their passage to the ovaries.

Velvet worms in this genus exhibit matrotrophic viviparity, that is, mothers in this genus retain eggs in their uteri and supply nourishment to their embryos, but without any placenta. The embryos are surrounded by a vitelline envelope, but there is no chorion in this genus. Females of M. inae produce eggs with almost no yolk, and embryos develop large "trophic organs" or "trophic vesicles" that may function as means to absorb nourishment from the mother. Embryos collected from females of this species feature huge translucent trophic vesicles that resemble those found in Peripatopsis sedgwicki and Paraperipatus novaebritanniae.

== Phylogeny ==
Phylogenetic analysis indicates that the species in the Chilean genus Metaperipatus form a clade that is a sister group of the South African genus Peripatopsis. These two genera share a pair of unusual features setting them apart from other velvet worms: dermal insemination and embryos with trophic vesicles. The evidence suggests that Metaperipatus and Peripatopsis diverged 141 million years ago, even before the southern Atlantic Ocean opened between South America and Africa 130 million years ago.

The closely related genera Metaperipatus and Peripatopsis, in turn, form a clade that is a sister group of the other South African genus Opisthopatus. Thus, Metaperipatus is nested among the South African species in a phylogenetic tree, and the South African group is paraphyletic with respect to the Chilean genus Metaperipatus. Together, these Chilean and South African genera form a West Gondwanan clade that is a sister group to the East Gondwanan clade containing other genera (found in Australia, New Zealand, Indonesia, and New Guinea) in the family Peripatopsidae.
