= Diemenipatus =

Scientific classification
- Kingdom: Animalia
- Phylum: Onychophora
- Family: Peripatopsidae
- Genus: Diemenipatus; Oliveira, Ruhberg, Rowell & Mayer, 2018

Species
- See text

Genus of Peripatopsid velvet worms

Diemenipatus is a genus of viviparous Tasmanian velvet worms in the family Peripatopsidae. All species in this genus have 15 pairs of legs in both sexes.

== Species ==
The genus contains the following species:

- Diemenipatus mesibovi Oliveira, Ruhberg, Rowell & Mayer, 2018
- Diemenipatus taiti Oliveira, Ruhberg, Rowell & Mayer, 2018
