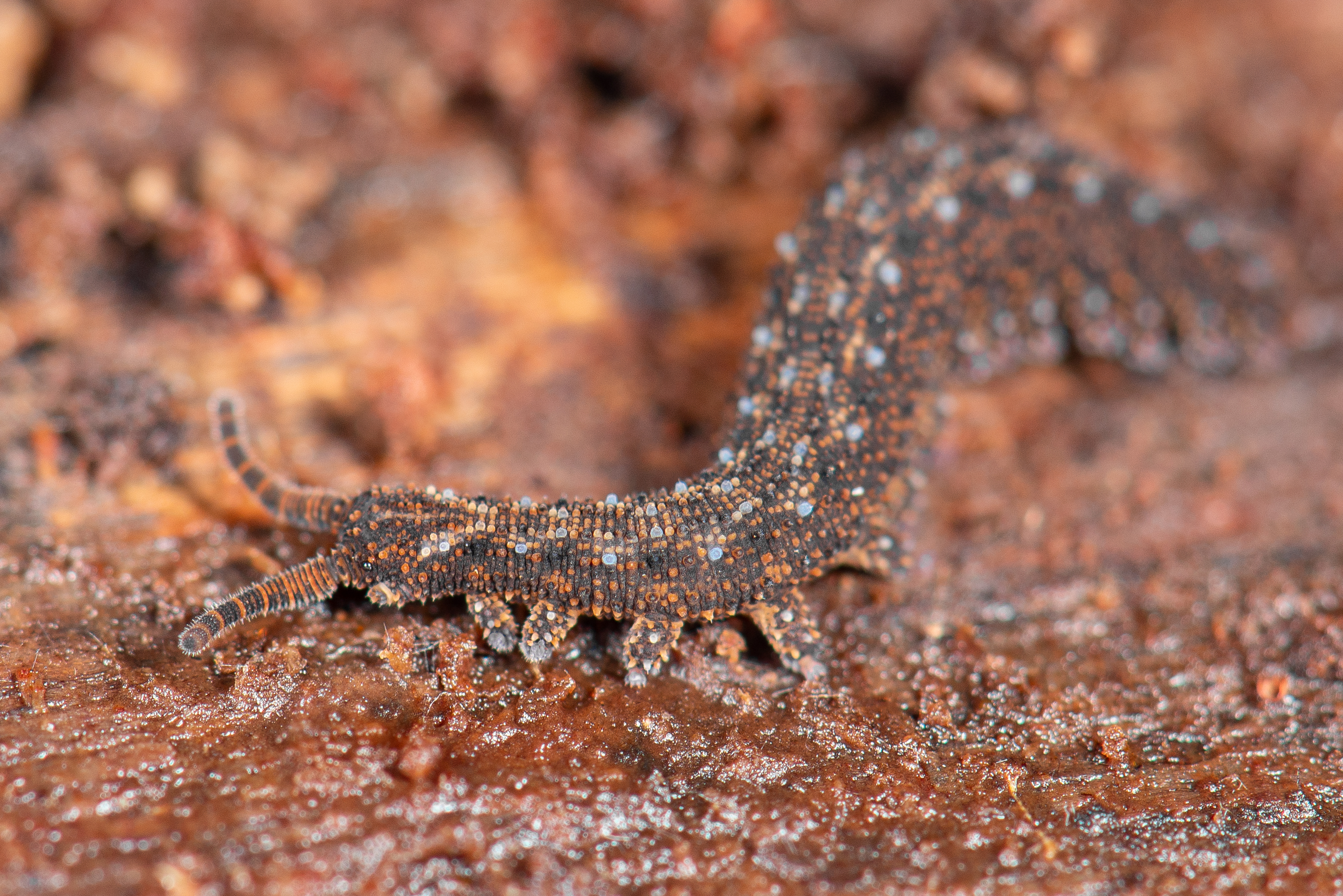
- Tasmanian velvet worm, Ooperipatellus sp.

Scientific classification
- Kingdom: Animalia
- Phylum: Onychophora
- Family: Peripatopsidae; Bouvier, 1905

Genera
- See text
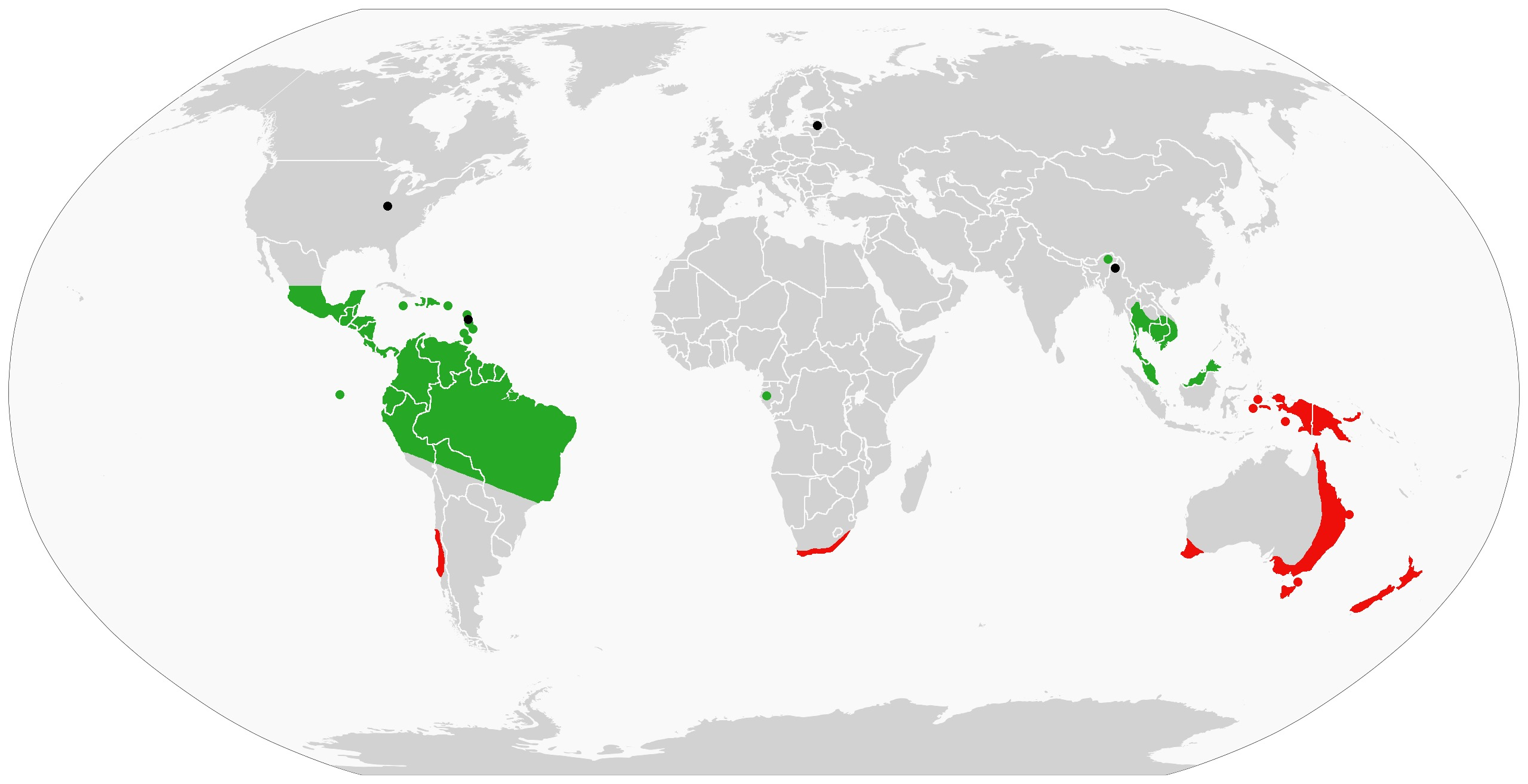
- Global range of Onychophora Peripatopsidae extant Peripatidae fossils

= Peripatopsidae =

Family of Onychophorans

Peripatopsidae is one of two extant families of velvet worm. This family includes more than 140 described species distributed among 41 genera, but some authorities deem only 131 of these species to be valid. The French zoologist Eugène Louis Bouvier proposed this family in 1905 with Peripatopsis as the type genus.

== Description ==
The Peripatopsidae exhibit relatively many characteristics that are perceived as original or "primitive" with respect to the Peripatidae. The species in this family have relatively few legs, ranging from 13 pairs (in Ooperipatellus nanus) to a maximum of 29 pairs (in Paraperipatus papuensis). Behind or between the last leg pair is the genital opening (gonopore). This family includes both oviparous genera (e.g., Ooperipatellus and Ooperipatus) and viviparous genera, which adopt various modes of supplying nourishment to their embryos, ranging from lecithotrophic ovoviviparity (with yolky eggs retained in their uteri, e.g., Peripatoides) to matrotrophic viviparity (with little or no yolk in the eggs retained in their uteri and nourishment supplied by the mother instead, e.g., Metaperipatus, Opisthopatus, Paraperipatus, Paropisthopatus, and Peripatopsis). The Peripatopsidae lack a placenta, however, which has been found in velvet worms only in the neotropical Peripatidae.

Most genera in this family have only 15 pairs of legs; one genus has 15 or fewer (Regimitra, with 14 or 15 in the only species), and another genus includes only species with fewer than 15 (Ooperipatellus, with 13 or 14, depending on the species). Two genera are characterized by 16 pairs of legs (Occiperipatoides and Paropisthopatus), another genus has 15 or 16 (Peripatoides), and only four genera include velvet worms with more than 16: Opisthopatus (with 16 to 18), Peripatopsis (with 16 to 25), Metaperipatus (with 19 to 22), and Paraperipatus (with 21 to 29). Although leg number is fixed within most peripatopsid species, the four genera that feature more than 16 leg pairs exhibit some variation in leg number within species as well as among species. Peripatopsid species with more legs also feature greater intraspecific variation in leg number.

== Distribution and habitat ==
The distribution of the Peripatopsidae (also known as southern velvet worms) is circumaustral; in particular, they inhabit Australasia, South Africa and Chile. Most genera in this family are found in Australia, one genus (Peripatoides) is found in New Zealand, and another (Ooperipatellus) is found in both; two genera (Opisthopatus and Peripatopsis) are found in South Africa, two others (Metaperipatus and Paropisthopatus) are found in Chile, and one other (Paraperipatus) is found in Indonesia and New Guinea.

== Classification ==
=== Phylogeny ===
Peripatopsidae is divided into two main clades: one with members in South Africa and Chile, and another with members in Australasia. The majority of species belong to the Australasian clade, with most occurring in Australia. Below is a genus-level phylogeny of Peripatopsid velvet worms. This phylogenetic tree does not include all genera.

- Peripatopsidae
  - East Gondwanan Clade
    - Paraperipatus
    - - Australian Clade
        - - Peripatopsidae sp. MCZ 131371 & MCZ 141416
          - - Ooperipatus
            - - Phallocephale
              - - Aethrikos
                - Euperipatoides
        - - Occiperipatoides
          - Kumbadjena
      - South Oceanian Clade
        - - - Peripatoides
            - Diemenipatus
          - Tasmanipatus
        - Ooperipatellus
  - West Gondwanan Clade
    - - Peripatopsis
      - Metaperipatus
    - Opisthopatus

=== Genera ===
The family contains the following genera:

- Acanthokara Reid, 1996
- Aethrikos Reid, 1996
- Aktinothele Reid, 1996
- Anoplokaros Reid, 1996
- Austroperipatus Baehr, 1977
- Baeothele Reid, 1996
- Centrorumis Reid, 1996
- Cephalofovea Ruhberg et al., 1988
- Critolaus Reid, 1996
- Dactylothele Reid, 1996
- Diemenipatus Oliveira, Ruhberg, Rowell & Mayer, 2018
- Dystactotylos Reid, 1996
- Euperipatoides Ruhberg, 1985
- Florelliceps Tait & Norman, 2001
- Hylonomoipos Reid, 1996
- Konothele Reid, 1996
- Kumbadjena Reid, 2002
- Lathropatus Reid, 2000
- Leucopatus (Ruhberg, Mesibov, Briscoe & Tait, 1991)
- Leuropezos Reid, 1996
- Mantonipatus Ruhberg, 1985
- Metaperipatus Clark, 1913
- Minyplanetes Reid, 1996
- Nodocapitus Reid, 1996
- Occiperipatoides Ruhberg, 1985
- Ooperipatellus Ruhberg, 1985
- Ooperipatus Dendy, 1900
- Opisthopatus Purcell, 1899
- Paraperipatus Ruhberg, 1985
- Paropisthopatus Ruhberg, 1985
- Peripatoides Pocock, 1894
- Peripatopsis Pocock, 1894
- Phallocephale Reid, 1996
- Planipapillus Reid, 1996
- Regimitra Reid, 1996
- Ruhbergia Reid, 1996
- Sphenoparme Reid, 1996
- Tasmanipatus Ruhberg et al. 1991
- Tetrameraden Reid, 1996
- Vescerro Reid, 1996
- Wambalana Reid, 1996
