= Amanda Reid (taxonomist) =

Australian scientist

- Education: Macquarie University
- Scientific career
- Fields: Malacology, taxonomy
- Workplaces: Australian Museum
- Thesis: A systematic review of the Peripatopsidae (Onychophora) in Australia (1996)
- Doctoral advisor: Noel Tait, David Briscoe, George Wilson

Amanda "Mandy" Louise Reid is an Australian taxonomist and malacologist. She held the position of collection manager of malacology at the Australian Museum from 2010 to 2023. She is a published researcher and author. Her research has resulted in the description of many species of velvet worms and cephalopods.

== Career ==
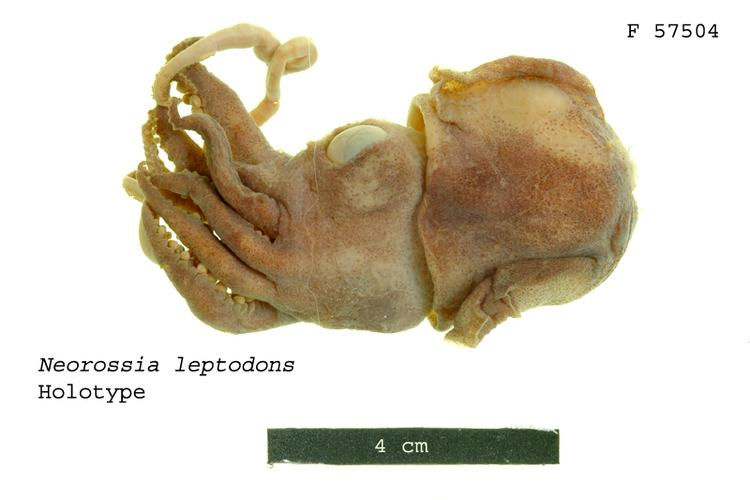
Neorossia leptodons, a species of bobtail squid described by Reid in 1992

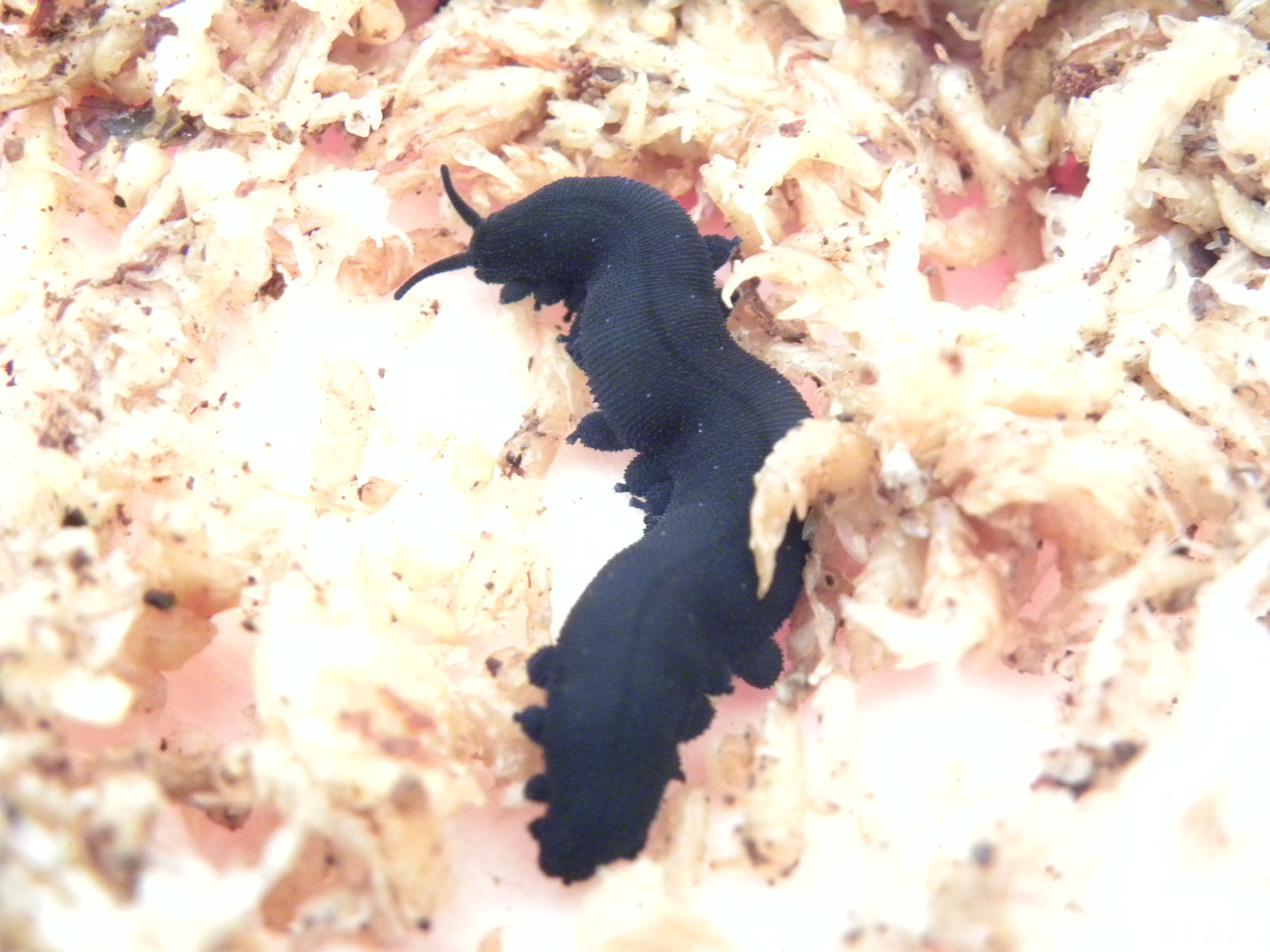
Euperipatoides rowelli, a species of velvet worm described by Reid in 1996

Reid is an alumna of Macquarie University, a public research university in Sydney, Australia, where she completed a Bachelor of Science degree in 1984. She completed a Master of Science degree in 1990, with a thesis titled Taxonomic review of the Australian Rossiinae (Cephalopoda : Sepiolidae). She completed a PhD in 1996, with a thesis titled A systematic review of the Peripatopsidae (Onychophora) in Australia.

Reid has an interest in cephalopods, particularly bobtail or bottletail squids (Sepiolidae), cuttlefishes (Sepiidae), and pygmy squids (Idiosepiidae). She has authored two books, and her research has been published in a number of scientific journals, including Invertebrate Taxonomy, Bulletin of Marine Science, Australian Natural History, Zootaxa, and others.

Reid is member of the Australian Marine Sciences Association (AMSA), the Cephalopod International Advisory Council, and Sustainable Population Australia.

== Books authored ==
- Norman M., Reid A. (2000) A Guide to Squid, Cuttlefish and Octopuses of Australasia (The Gould League of Australia and CSIRO Publishing: Melbourne).
- Reid A. (2016) Cephalopods of Australia and Sub-Antarctic Territories (CSIRO Publishing: Melbourne).

== See also ==
- List of Macquarie University people
- Partial list of taxa described by Amanda Reid
