= List of Hololepta species =

List of clown beetle species

This is a list of 106 species in the genus Hololepta, clown beetles.

== Hololepta species ==
- Hololepta acutipecta (Lewis, 1905)
- Hololepta aequalis Say, 1825
- Hololepta africanae Lewis, 1898
- Hololepta alligans Marseul in Marseul and Oliveira, 1879
- Hololepta amurensis Reitter, 1879
- Hololepta andicola Schmidt, 1893
- Hololepta aradiformis Erichson, 1834
- Hololepta atrovirens Bickhardt, 1912
- Hololepta attenuata Blanchard, 1843
- Hololepta australica Marseul, 1853
- Hololepta baulnyi Marseul, 1857
- Hololepta belti Lewis, 1885
- Hololepta bidentata Marseul, 1853
- Hololepta bogotana Marseul, 1853
- Hololepta bractea Erichson, 1834
- Hololepta braziliensis Dillon, 1935
- Hololepta burgeoni Desbordes, 1917
- Hololepta caffra Erichson, 1834
- Hololepta canalicollis Lewis, 1888
- Hololepta canaliculata Lewis, 1901
- Hololepta caracasica Marseul, 1860
- Hololepta cavata Lewis, 1912
- Hololepta cayennensis Marseul, 1853
- Hololepta cerdo (Marseul, 1853)
- Hololepta cimex (Marseul, 1870)
- Hololepta clauda (Marseul, 1860)
- Hololepta cobanensis Wenzel and Dybas, 1941
- Hololepta comis Lewis, 1914
- Hololepta confusa (Marseul, 1853)
- Hololepta cubensis Erichson, 1834
- Hololepta curta Marseul, 1853
- Hololepta depressa Lewis, 1884
- Hololepta devia (Marseul, 1853)
- Hololepta dilatata Schmidt, 1892
- Hololepta dyak Lewis, 1900
- Hololepta elongata Erichson, 1834
- Hololepta excisa Marseul, 1853
- Hololepta feae Lewis, 1892
- Hololepta ferox Marseul, 1880
- Hololepta funebre (Marseul, 1870)
- Hololepta glabra Fahraeus in Boheman, 1851
- Hololepta guidonis Marseul, 1860
- Hololepta guyanensis Desbordes, 1928
- Hololepta higoniae Lewis, 1894
- Hololepta humilis Paykull, 1811
- Hololepta immarginata Schmidt, 1889
- Hololepta indica Erichson, 1834
- Hololepta inermis Bickhardt, 1914
- Hololepta insignis Schmidt, 1889
- Hololepta insularis Wenzel, 1944
- Hololepta interrupta (Marseul, 1853)
- Hololepta intersecta (Lewis, 1904)
- Hololepta laevigata Guérin-Ménéville, 1833
- Hololepta lamina Paykull, 1811
- Hololepta lata (Marseul, 1853)
- Hololepta liebmanni Bickhardt, 1921
- Hololepta lissopyga Marseul, 1853
- Hololepta lucida J. E. LeConte, 1845
- Hololepta malariae Lewis, 1895
- Hololepta malleata Lewis in Andrews, 1900
- Hololepta mastersii MacLeay, 1871
- Hololepta meridiana Marseul, 1853
- Hololepta minuta Erichson, 1834
- Hololepta morator Marseul, 1860
- Hololepta nepalensis Lewis, 1910
- Hololepta nuda (Lewis, 1885)
- Hololepta obscura Marseul, 1853
- Hololepta obtusipes Marseul, 1864
- Hololepta optiva Lewis, 1914
- Hololepta palisoti Mazur, 1972
- Hololepta paropsis Lewis, 1898
- Hololepta patula (Lewis, 1906)
- Hololepta perraudieri Marseul, 1857
- Hololepta perroti Cooman, 1939
- Hololepta pervalida Blaisdell, 1892
- Hololepta pilipes Lewis, 1885
- Hololepta pinguis Schmidt, 1892
- Hololepta placida Lewis, 1888
- Hololepta plagigera (Lewis, 1888)
- Hololepta plana (Sulzer, 1776)
- Hololepta polita (Marseul, 1853)
- Hololepta pontavicei Marseul, 1860
- Hololepta populnea J. L. LeConte, 1851
- Hololepta punctulata (Marseul, 1853)
- Hololepta quadridentata (Olivier, 1789)
- Hololepta quadriformis Marseul, 1853
- Hololepta reichii (Marseul, 1853)
- Hololepta salva Lewis, 1914
- Hololepta scissoma Marseul, 1860
- Hololepta semicincta Marseul, 1853
- Hololepta sternincisa Marseul, 1886
- Hololepta striatidera Marseul, 1853
- Hololepta strigilata Schmidt, 1889
- Hololepta subhumilis Marseul, 1853
- Hololepta sublucida Marseul, 1853
- Hololepta subnitida (Lewis, 1888)
- Hololepta sulcithorax Desbordes, 1913
- Hololepta syntexis Lewis, 1900
- Hololepta truxillana Marseul, 1860
- Hololepta umbratilis Lewis, 1912
- Hololepta vagata Lewis, 1912
- Hololepta vernicis Casey, 1893
- Hololepta vicina J. L. LeConte, 1851
- Hololepta vulpes Marseul, 1870
- Hololepta wenzeli Mazur, 1984
- Hololepta yucateca (Marseul, 1853)
