= Insect olfaction =

Function of chemical receptors

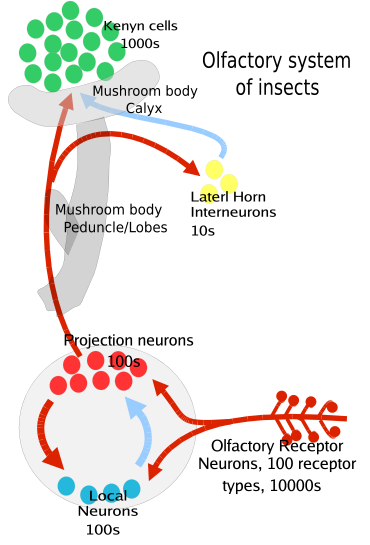
Olfactory pathway, insects

Insect olfaction refers to the function of chemical receptors that enable insects to detect and identify volatile compounds for foraging, predator avoidance, finding mating partners (via pheromones) and locating oviposition habitats. Thus, it is the most important sensation for insects. Most important insect behaviors must be timed perfectly which is dependent on what they smell and when they smell it. For example, olfaction is essential for locating host plants and hunting prey in many species of insects, such as the moth Deilephila elpenor and the wasp Polybia sericea, respectively.

The two organs insects primarily use for detecting odors are the antennae and specialized mouth parts called the maxillary palps. However, a recent study has demonstrated the olfactory role of ovipositor in fig wasps. Inside of these olfactory organs there are neurons called olfactory receptor neurons which, as the name implies, house receptors for scent molecules in their cell membrane. The majority of olfactory receptor neurons typically reside in the antenna. These neurons can be very abundant; for example, Drosophila flies have 2,600 olfactory sensory neurons.

Insects are capable of smelling and differentiating between thousands of volatile compounds both sensitively and selectively. Sensitivity is how attuned the insect is to very small amounts of an odorant or small changes in the concentration of an odorant. Selectivity refers to the insects ability to tell one odorant apart from another. Among blood-feeding arthropods, these compounds are commonly broken into three classes: short chain carboxylic acids, aldehydes and low molecular weight nitrogenous compounds.

Insects have been used as a model system to study mammal and especially human olfaction. Yet, unlike vertebrates who use G protein coupled receptors (GPCRs), insects express proteins including ORs (olfactory receptors), GRs (gustatory receptors) and IRs (ionotropic receptors) which are all heteromeric ligand-gated ion channels. A moth species in the order of Lepidoptera known as the black cutworm moth (Agrotis ipsilon) produces even more proteins including OBPs (odorant-binding proteins), CSPs (chemosensory binding proteins), and SNMPs (sensory neuron membrane proteins) that help the moth recognize sex pheromones and odorants such as those released from host plants. Much like in vertebrates, axons from the sensory neurons converge into glomeruli, but differ in where the glomeruli are housed. In mammals they are located in the olfactory bulbs, but in insects they are in the antennal lobe.

== Evolutionary history ==
Olfaction is metabolically costly. The evolutionary trade-offs involved require further study because as of 2016 most such research has been done under laboratory conditions with unrealistically reliable food.

== Olfactory cascade ==
Sensory neurons in the antenna, maxillary palp, and labella generate odor-specific electrical signals called spikes (action potentials) in response to binding of odors to cell surface proteins like the olfactory receptors. The sensory neurons in the antenna and maxillary send this information via their axons to the antennal lobe, while sensory neuron in the labella send this information via axons to the subesophageal ganglion. Inside the antennal lobe they synapse with other neurons in semidelineated (with membrane boundaries) structures called glomeruli.

Specifically the process is as follows: first the odorant wafts towards an insect's antenna or maxillary palp which is covered with hair-like projections called sensilla. The odorant then enters through tiny pores in the exoskeleton (or cuticle) of that sensillum and diffuses into the fluid between the cells called extracellular fluids. There the odorant molecule binds to an odorant binding protein which transports it to a receptor and co-receptor (Orco) team on the surface of the olfactory receptor neuron (ORN). This leads to the neuron firing an action potential down the axon. This signal is sent to the antennal lobe or subesophogeal ganglion of the insects brain where it can then integrate the information with other signals from other sensilla.

These ORNs are bipolar, on one end are the olfactory dendrites with the receptors for the odors and on the other end are the axons that carry the action potential to the antennal lobe of the brain. The antennal lobes have two kinds of neurons, projection neurons (mostly excitatory) and local neurons (inhibitory, with some excitatory). The projection neurons send their axon terminals to a part of the insect brain called the mushroom bodies (important in regulating learned odor responses) and another part of the brain called the lateral horn (important in regulating innate odor responses). Both of these regions are part of the protocerebrum of the insect brain.

== Research methods ==
Action potential recordings are conducted in three different ways electroantenograms, electropalpograms, and single sensillum recordings (SSR). In electroantenograms (EAG) and electropalpograms (EPG) the action potentials from the entire antenna or maxillary palp, respectively, is recorded. EAGs and EPGs provide an overall view of olfaction in the respective organ. During an SSR an electrode is inserted into just one sensillum and the recording is made from only the ORNs which are contained within that sensillum, providing more detailed information^{.}

Any of these methods can be combined with a high resolution gas chromatography to isolate volatile compounds from important animals or habitats. For example, this method could be used to determine which compound from a particular flower is the most attractive to a bee. Recordings from projection neurons show that in some insects there is strong specialization and discrimination for the odors presented by the ORNs. This is especially true for the projection neurons of the macroglomeruli, a specialized complex of glomeruli responsible for the pheromones detection.

== Repellents and attractants ==
Humans exploit the insect olfactory system to control agricultural and disease carrying pests. For some agricultural pests manufactured sex pheromones are placed in traps to capture adults before they can oviposit (lay their eggs) leading to the hatching of their destructive larvae. While there are thousands of chemicals insects can detect there is a limited range that insects use as cues to move towards or away from the source of the odorant.

The art of finding an attractant or repellent for a particular insect of interest is complicated and a long, intensive process. For example, using pheromones only attracts insects in their reproductive stage, a short period in their lives. While scents of food may be attractive to hungry insects they would not be effective in a field full of a crop that is palatable to that insect.

=== Situationally-dependent attractants / repellents ===
Insects use the same signal for many different uses depending on the situation this is called chemical parsimony. Situations that may change how an insect behaves in reaction to a scent are things like the concentration of the compound, the life stage of the insect, its mating status, other olfactory cues, the insects feeding state (hungry or full), the time of day, or even the insects body position. For example, Drosophila are very attracted to apple cider vinegar but in very high concentrations an additional olfactory receptor (that has low affinity for the vinegar, Or85a) is activated which changes the fly's behavior from attraction to aversion. These different behaviors to the same cue is called behavioral plasticity.

=== Carbon dioxide ===
Many insects are capable of detecting very minute changes in the concentration of CO_{2}. While CO_{2} has been found to be an attractant in every arthropod studied and it is very important in mosquito monitoring and control, even this stereotyped reaction can be plastic. Drosophila avoid CO_{2} when walking but move towards it when in flight.

=== DEET ===
Many insects (and other arthropods) have been shown to avoid areas containing N,N-diethyl-3-methylbenzamide or DEET. They innately avoid DEET, likely because it is a "confusant" that stimulates gustatory, ionotropic, and olfactory receptors and "distorts" other odorants interaction with those receptors.

== See also ==
- Electroantennography, Electro-olfactography
- Machine olfaction, E-nose
- Bill S. Hansson
- Single sensillum recording
