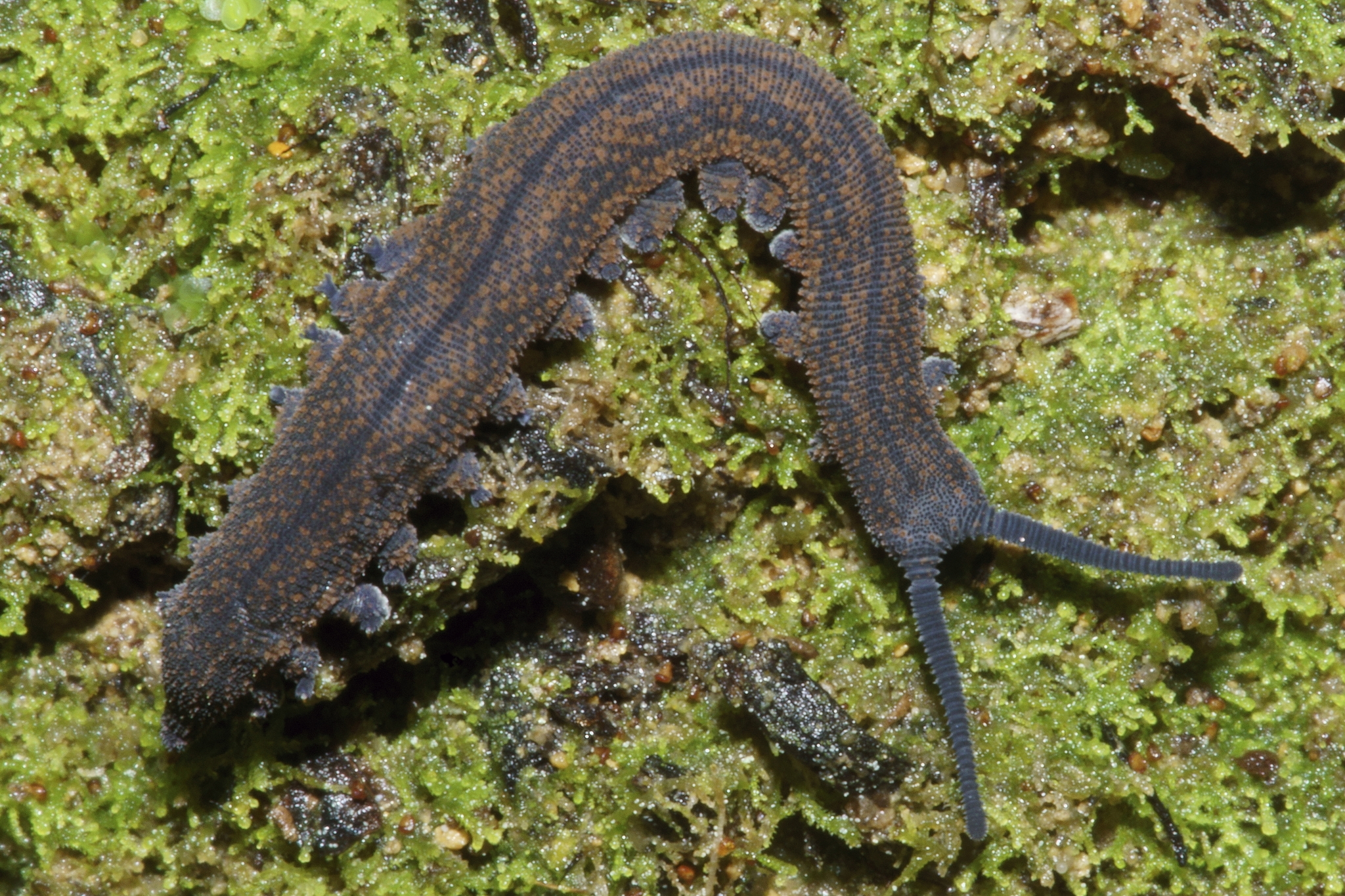

Conservation status
- Not Threatened (NZ TCS)

Scientific classification
- Kingdom: Animalia
- Phylum: Onychophora
- Family: Peripatopsidae
- Genus: Peripatoides
- Species: P. novaezealandiae

Binomial name
- Peripatoides novaezealandiae (Hutton, 1876)

= Peripatoides novaezealandiae =

Species of peripatopsid velvet worm

Peripatoides novaezealandiae s. str. is an allozymatic (reproductively isolated) species of velvet worms in the Peripatoides novaezealandiae-complex, endemic to New Zealand. Other described species include P. aurorbis, P. kawekaensis, P. morgani and P. sympatrica.

== Description ==
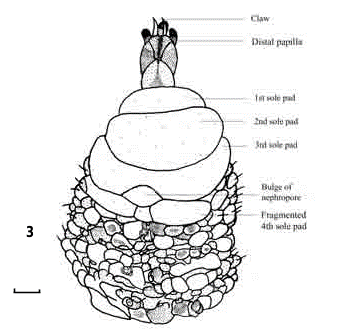
Location of sole pads and distal papillae on the fifth leg of a male from P. novaezealandiae-complex.

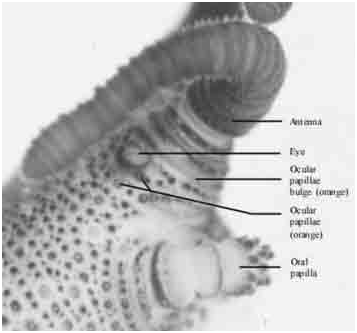
Location of characteristic orange papillae bulge relative to eye on P. novaezealandiae-complex.

As with all Onychophora, Peripatoides novaezealandiae s. str. has a long, worm-like body, a head, and an anal cone. The head has three pairs of modified limbs: the antennae, the jaws, and the oral papillae. Their skin is velvety in texture and the sticky slime projected from their oral papillae does not stick to it. They respire via two rows of trachea on the dorsal surface, which alternate with the legs.

All species in the P. novaezealandiae-complex have fifteen pairs of unjointed, hollow cone-like limbs called lobopods. This distinguishes them from the closely related P. suteri which has sixteen pairs of lobopods. Peripatoides novaezealandiae-complex has three complete spinous pads and a fourth fragmented pad on the ventral side of the legs. Individuals all have three distal papillae on the feet.

Colour varies from brownish red to purplish black, but there is usually a thin black dorsal stripe. A bulge of orange-coloured papillae near the eyes is characteristic of the P. novaezealandiae-complex.

Length varies from 2.5–5 cm. Males can reach a weight of up to 200 mg while adult female weight varies more widely, with some specimens of over 800 mg.

Morphologically, males can usually be distinguished from females by the presence of a pair of posterior orange papillae which mark the opening of the anal glands. These papillae appear before maturity, so cannot be used to identify sexually mature males. Males in the P. novaezealandiae-complex do not have the pheromone-producing crural glands found in many other Onychophora, such as Euperipatoides rowelli.

Newborns of P. novaezealandiae s. str. are pure white with slightly purple antennae. Other P. novaezealandiae-complex morphs are born with pigments, possibly differentiating them from P. novaezealandiae s. str.

== Distribution and habitat ==
=== Natural global range ===
Peripatoides novaezealandiae s. str. is endemic to New Zealand.

=== New Zealand range ===
Peripatoides novaezealandiae s. str. is limited to Wellington, Wairarapa, and southern Hawke's Bay regions in places such as Miller reserve, Otari, Akatarawa, Waiohine, Carterton, and Pahiatua.

=== Habitat preferences ===
Peripatoides novaezealandiae s. str. is usually found within or beneath rotting logs. Sufficient moisture is vital for all Onychophora as they cannot regulate water loss due to a lack of both a waxy cuticle and tracheal spiracles.

== Life cycle ==
As with all of P. novaezealandiae-complex, Peripatoides novaezealandiae s. str. use lecithotrophic viviparity to reproduce and supply nutrition to their young. This means embryos are surrounded by egg membranes and derive nutrition from a yolk while inside the ovary. Hatching and birth are simultaneous.

Juveniles go through three stages:

- Stage A: wet and shiny integument (outer tissue). Needle-like spines of sensory papillae exposed.
- Stage B: integument becomes more strongly pigmented and loses lustre. Sensory spines still exposed to some extent. This change is up to nine days after birth.
- Stage C: integument fully pigmented and has no lustre. Sensory spines no longer exposed, and papillae resemble adult form. Time to reach this stage varies considerably with the location and morph, suggesting possible diagnostic differences between subspecies of the P. novaezealandiae-complex.

Peripatids grow by moulting the outer cuticle when it becomes too restrictive. P. novaezealandiae s. str. is an iteroparous batch breeder, meaning that it produces young in discontinuous batches.

Males of P. novaezealandiae s. str. reach sexual maturity between 40–60 mg body weight, while females reach sexual maturity between 80–95 mg body weight. Females with embryos are usually between 114–508 mg but can be as large as 800 mg. Prior to the development of the first embryos, female paired uteri are white and thin. Subsequently, the uteri are thick-walled, yellow, and baggy for all mature females.

Females can store sperm in spermathecae, possibly for more than two years. Dissections show that both males and females contain sperm in all months of the year.

In some Onychophora, spermatophores (capsules containing sperm) from the male attach themselves to the integument of the females. Sperm invade the haemolymph (body cavity), making their way to the reproductive tract. No spermatophores or scars have been found on female P. novaezealandiae-complex, but sperm has been found within the haemolymph. Evidence suggests sperm transfer in this species is dermal-haemocoelic (through skin into the body cavity), but this has yet to be confirmed.

== Diet and foraging ==
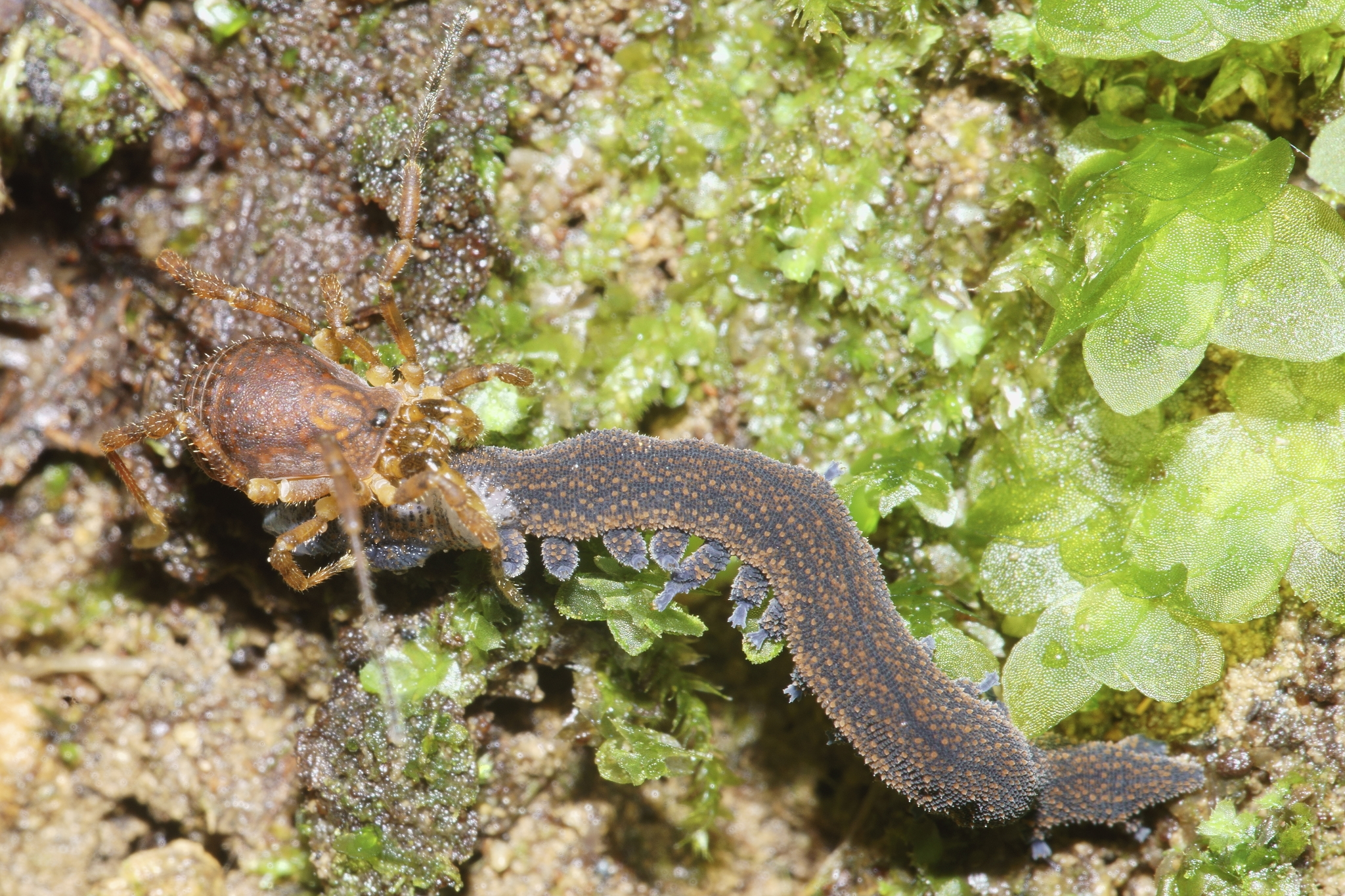
A harvestman (Nuncia conjuncta ssp. conjuncta) eating P. novaezealandiae.

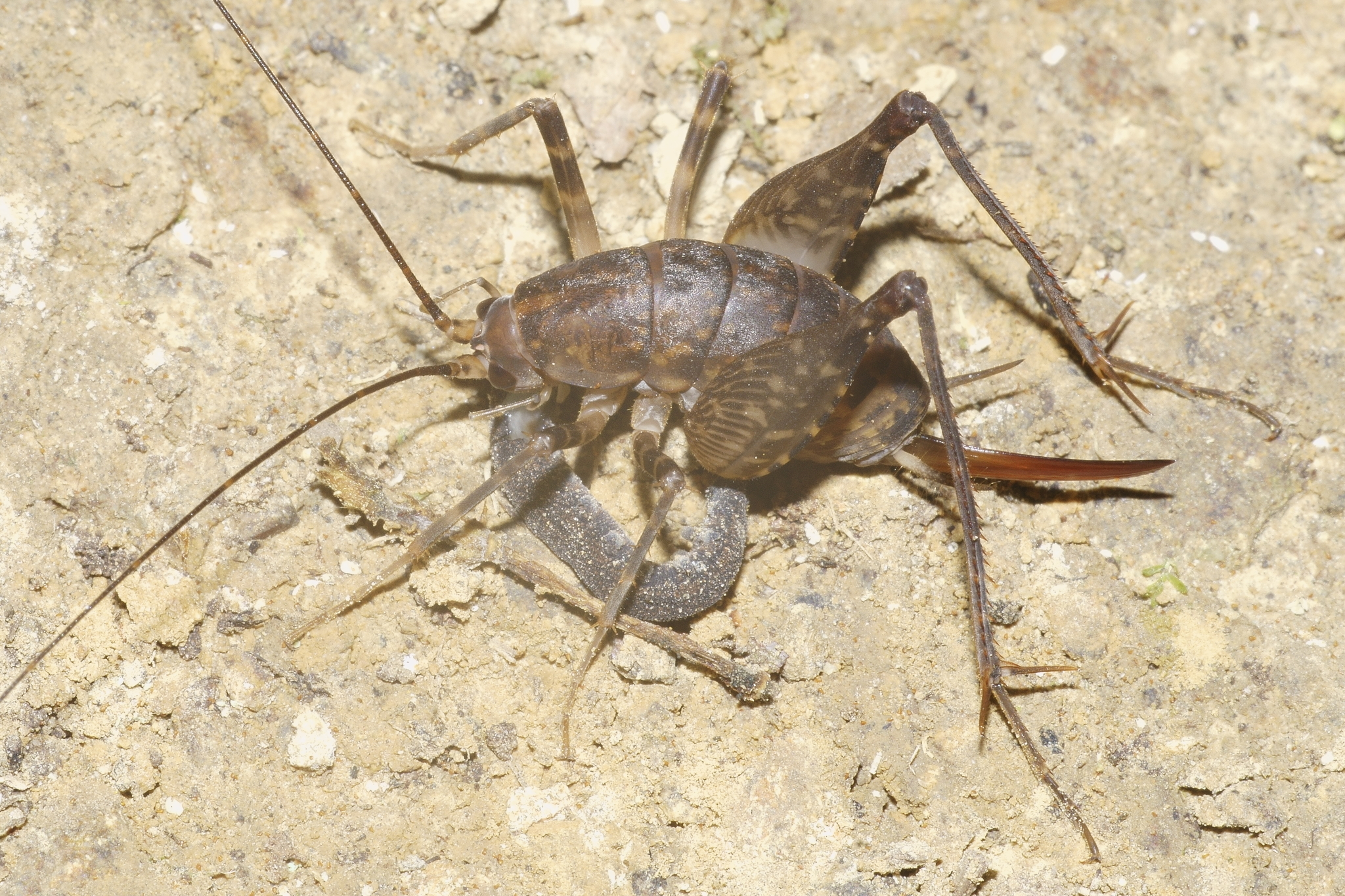
A cave wētā (Miotopus diversus) eating P. novaezealandiae.

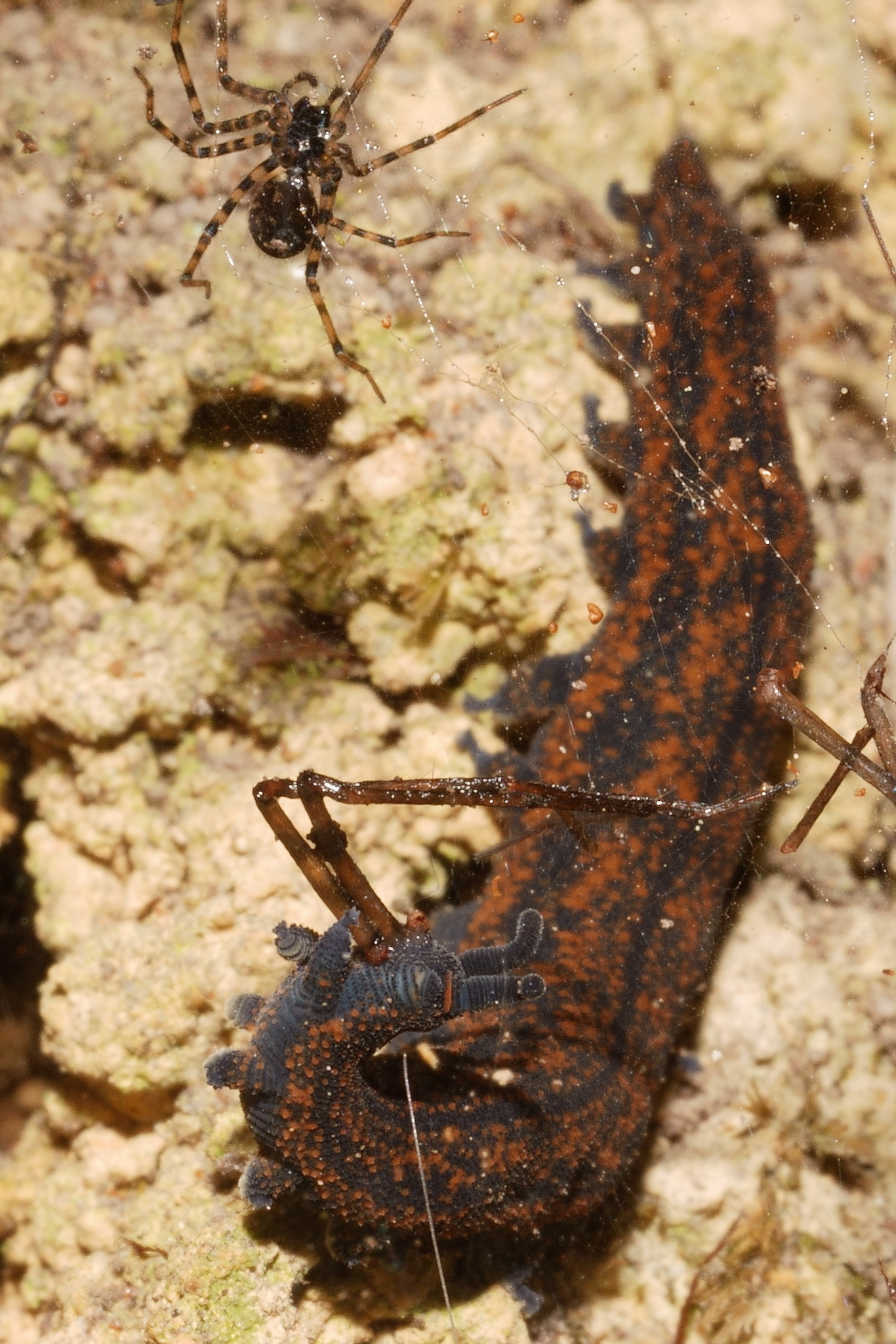
P. novaezealandiae eating a Nanocambridgea gracilipes spider.

Like others in their genus, the Peripatoides novaezealandiae s. str. is a nocturnal predator.

Captive individuals of P. novaezealandiae-complex have been sustained with flies. An abundance of centipedes have been found in logs that also contain P. novaezealandiae s. str., suggesting a possible predator-prey relationship.

Peripatids use their oral papillae to shoot out sticky slime which thickens upon contact with the air and covers prey in a strong, net-like structure. They approach and use their jaws to puncture the cuticle of the trapped animal, injecting digestive enzymes and sucking up the liquefied remains.

== Predators, parasites, and diseases ==
Globally there has been very little research on the ecology of Onychophora. Several species, including spiders and beetles, have been found in rotting logs along with P. novaezealandiae s. str. It is unknown if these species are predators, prey, or perhaps either depending on the specific interaction. Observations on iNaturalist have shown two species eating P. novaezealandiae s. str., a harvestman (Nuncia conjuncta ssp. conjuncta) and a cave wētā (Miotopus diversus).

External nematodes have been found behind the oral papillae of P. novaezealandiae s. str., but there is no evidence of parasitism. Mites have also been found on the integument, but without evidence of any feeding. Both relationships may be better characterised as phoresy, where species are transported by the peripatus without causing harm.

No internal parasites or damage consistent with fungal infection have been found in P. novaezealandiae.

== Conservation status ==
As a whole, P. novaezealandiae-complex is classed as ‘not threatened’ according to the 2018 New Zealand Threat Classification System. In part, this is because the allozymatic species have not all been described and little is known about their distribution.
