= EOG (disambiguation) =

EOG may refer to:

- Electrooculography
- Electro-olfactography
- EOG Resources, an American oil and natural gas company
- Eye of GNOME, an image viewer
- Orthodox Church of the Gauls (French: Église Orthodoxe des Gaules)
- Extreme Operating Gust, a wind situation relevant in wind turbine design
