= Single sensillum recording =

Scientific process used for insect olfaction measurement

Single sensillum recording (SSR) is a form of extracellular electrophysiology. This technique measures action potentials, generated from olfactory sensory neurons (OSNs), through a single sensilla on an insects' antennae. These sensillum are hair-like structures that protrude through the cuticle as well as several other auxiliary and sensory cells.

This method is often utilized if more quantitative results are desired, as the recordings produced have the ability to test and demonstrate the sensitivity and selectivity of individual OSNs, providing a technique for mapping the receptiveness of olfactory receptor proteins within the OSNs. It is also often combined with other techniques, such as gas chromatography, sensillum incision, diffusion, or microinjection.

Some applications for this technique include testing pheromone sensitivity, testing reactions to volatile compounds in the environment, and reactivity to chemical cues from other organisms.

== Methods ==
The test insect is mounted within a pipette tip, with the head slightly protruding from the tip. The main goal of this is to restrain the insect and prevent any movement from interfering with the recording quality. The pipette tip containing the insect is fixed to a microscope slide facing upwards, then the antennae are fixed using a glass microcapillary, wax, or tape; manipulating it until the desired orientation is attained.

In order to record, a location as close to the sensilla (usually the eye) is penetrated with a ground electrode. Then, another is inserted into the cuticle of the sensilla. These electrodes are typically made of tungsten or glass and are chemically sharpened to ensure precise penetration of their target locations. Initial contact will often result in an increase in signal noise, acting as a signal that the prepared insect is both alive and properly grounded. At this point, action potentials should be easy to distinguish from background noise; however, if the signal strength is weak one can replace the electrodes. Alternatively, one may test using different sensilla.

== See also ==
- Electroantennography
- Insect olfaction
