= Electrography (disambiguation) =

Electrography most often refers to electrophotography, that is, Kirlian photography.

Electrography may also refer to:

- Measurement and recording of electrophysiologic activity for diagnostic purposes
  - Electrocardiography (ECG or EKG), electrography of heart electrical activity and rhythm
  - Electromyography (EMG), electrography of other muscle action potentials throughout the body
  - Electroencephalography (EEG), electrography of brain waves (from outside the skull)
    - Electrocorticography or intracranial EEG (iEEG or ECoG), EEG with direct contact to the cerebral cortex
  - Electrooculography (EOG), electrography of intraocular potential differences
  - Electroolfactography (EOG), electrography of olfaction (smell)
  - Electroretinography (ERG), electrography of retinal cell action potentials
  - Electronystagmography (ENG), electrography of eye muscle movements
  - Electrocochleography (ECOG), electrography of cochlear auditory activity
  - Electroantennography (EAG), electrography of insect antennae olfaction
  - Electropenetrography (EPG), electrography of insect penetration activity (usually by feeding and sometimes ovipositing, and usually on a plant)
  - Electrogastrography (EGG), electrography of stomach smooth muscle
    - Electrogastroenterogram (EGEG), electrography of stomach and bowel smooth muscle
  - Electroglottography (EGG), electrography of glottal movement
  - Electropalatography (EPG), electrography of palatal contact of the tongue
- Some kinds of electrical brain stimulation (EBS)
