= Electricity detection =

Electricity detection may refer to:

- Electroreception and electrogenesis by animals
- The field of electrophysiology, measurement and recording of electrophysiological activity in the body

== See also ==
- electrography (disambiguation)
- galvanometer
