= Hololepta yucateca =

Scientific classification
- Kingdom: Animalia
- Phylum: Arthropoda
- Class: Insecta
- Order: Coleoptera
- Suborder: Polyphaga
- Infraorder: Staphyliniformia
- Family: Histeridae
- Genus: Hololepta
- Species: H. yucateca

Binomial name
- Hololepta yucateca (Marseul, 1853)

Species of beetle

Hololepta yucateca is a species of clown beetle in the family Histeridae. It is found in Central America and North America.

== Subspecies ==
These two subspecies belong to the species Hololepta yucateca:

- Hololepta yucateca princeps J. L. LeConte, 1860
- Hololepta yucateca yucateca (Marseul, 1853)
