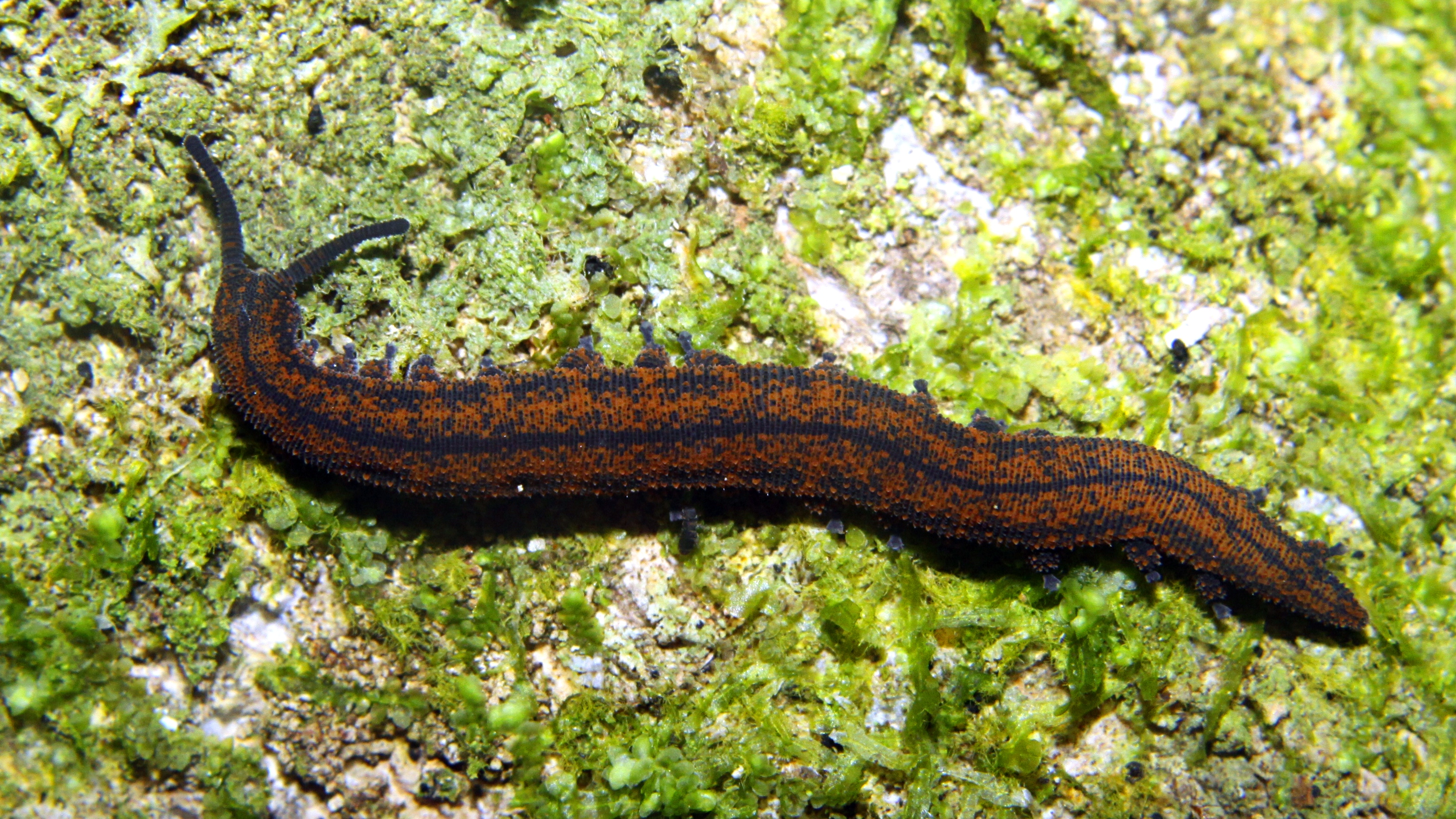

Scientific classification
- Kingdom: Animalia
- Phylum: Onychophora
- Family: Peripatopsidae
- Genus: Peripatoides; Pocock, 1894

Species
- See text

= Peripatoides =

Genus of Peripatopsid velvet worm

Peripatoides is a genus of velvet worms in the family Peripatopsidae. Velvet worms in this genus are found throughout New Zealand. Like all velvet worms, these animals are nocturnal predators that spit a sticky slime to trap their prey. Unlike the species in the only other genus of velvet worms found in New Zealand, Ooperipatellus, which lay eggs (that is, are oviparous), the species in the genus Peripatoides are live-bearing (ovoviviparous).

== Description ==
The number of legs in this genus varies among species but is generally stable within species. Most species have 15 pairs of legs, but one species (Peripatoides suteri) has 16 leg pairs instead. Velvet worms in this genus range from 5 mm to 120 mm in length.

Velvet worms in this genus exhibit two traits that are especially unusual in the family Peripatopsidae. First, velvet worms in this genus lack crural glands and crural papillae, which are present in most peripatopsid genera. Second, the anal glands in this genus open laterally on the anal segment. In most peripatopsid genera, these glands open between the anus and the genital opening.

== Taxonomy ==
Relying on morphology alone, the taxonomy of the genus Peripatoides distinguished between three species: Peripatoides novaezealandiae, with 15 pairs of legs and (usually) three distal foot papillae, Peripatoides suteri, with 16 leg pairs and (usually) four distal foot papillae, and Peripatoides indigo, with 15 leg pairs and five distal foot papillae. Phylogenetic analysis using molecular data, however, has since found P. novaezealandiae (as traditionally understood based on morphology) to be a species complex including several distinct species. This analysis finds both P. suteri and P. indigo nested among several other clades within the P. novaezealandiae species complex in a phylogenetic tree.

In 1998, five reproductively isolated species in northern New Zealand, each with 15 leg pairs, were described using molecular data. These five species, P. aurorbis, P. kawekaensis, P. morgani, P. sympatrica, and P. novaezealandiae (sensu stricto, that is, as more narrowly defined), have no morphological characters that distinguish them, but they are genetically differentiated. Some authorities considered P. novaezealandiae and the cryptic species to be nomina dubia, but later recognized the species as valid when the holotype specimens records at Te Papa Tongarewa Museum were linked to the descriptions. In 2024, three additional species in this genus from the South Island of New Zealand were described based on molecular evidence (P. otepoti, P. taitonga, and P. waikaia). Some authorities consider these names to be nomina nuda rather than valid species names.

=== Species ===
The genus Peripatoides consists of the following species:

- Peripatoides aurorbis Trewick, 1998
- Peripatoides indigo Ruhberg, 1985
- Peripatoides kawekaensis Trewick, 1998
- Peripatoides morgani (Trewick, 1998)
- Peripatoides novaezealandiae s. str. (Hutton, 1876)
- Peripatoides otepoti Trewick, Koot & Morgan-Richards, 2024
- Peripatoides suteri (Dendy, 1894)
- Peripatoides sympatrica Trewick, 1998
- Peripatoides taitonga Trewick, Koot & Morgan-Richards, 2024
- Peripatoides waikaia Trewick, Koot & Morgan-Richards, 2024

== Geographic distribution and habitat ==
=== Natural global range ===
All species in the genus Peripatoides are endemic to New Zealand.

=== Habitat preferences ===
Onychophora (including species within the genus Peripatoides) are usually found within or beneath rotting logs, though individuals have occasionally been discovered among leaf litter and beneath objects such as stones and rocks and in crevasses. Sufficient moisture is vital for all Onychophora as they cannot regulate water loss due to a lack of both a waxy cuticle and tracheal spiracles.

In 1989, several thousand of the P. otepoti were found on a property in Dunedin, living in an old kitchen dump among dry tins cans and sheets of roofing iron, and in a separate pile of bricks. The existence of the P. otepoti in a wide range of elevations forest, scrub and tussock, suggests that prey availability and moisture are more important than vegetation type when determining habitat suitability.

== Reproduction ==
This genus exhibits lecithotrophic ovoviviparity; that is, mothers in this genus produce and retain yolky eggs in their uteri. The eggs are fertilized internally, and babies develop inside their mother until large enough to be born, in batches of 4–6, as colourless miniatures of the parents. These live-bearing Peripatoides have dermal-haemocoelic sperm transfer – which means sperm dissolve holes in the skin of the female to enter the body (haemolymph) anywhere on the body wall of the female.

Hutton originally claimed that individuals of Peripatoides novaezealandiae are hermaphroditic, possibly due to confusion regarding sperm storage sacs found within the female. This has since been contested, and more recent literature clearly designates individuals of P. novaezealandiae-complex as male or female. Sex can be identified in some morphs as young as two months after birth, but sexual differentiation is complete for all members of the P. novaezealandiae-complex by five months.

Juveniles go through three stages:

- Stage A: wet and shiny integument (outer tissue). Needle-like spines of sensory papillae exposed.
- Stage B: integument becomes more strongly pigmented and loses lustre. Sensory spines still exposed to some extent. This change is up to nine days after birth.
- Stage C: integument fully pigmented and has no lustre. Sensory spines no longer exposed, and papillae resemble adult form. Time to reach this stage varies considerably with the location and morph, suggesting possible diagnostic differences between subspecies of the P. novaezealandiae-complex.

Peripatids grow by moulting the outer cuticle when it becomes too restrictive.

== Diet, prey, and predators ==
=== Diet and foraging ===
Like others in their family, Peripatoides novaezealandiae-complex is a nocturnal predator.

Captive individuals of P. novaezealandiae-complex have been sustained with flies. An abundance of centipedes, ants, mites, and amphipods have been found in logs that also contain P. novaezealandiae, suggesting a possible predator-prey relationship.

Peripatids use their oral papillae to shoot out sticky slime which thickens upon contact with the air and covers prey in a strong, net-like structure. They approach and use their jaws to puncture the cuticle of the trapped animal, injecting digestive enzymes and sucking up the liquefied remains.

== Other information ==
=== Conservation status ===
Peripatoides novaezealandiae-complex is classed as 'not threatened' according to the 2018 New Zealand Threat Classification System. In part, this is because the allozymatic species have not all been described and little is known about their distribution.

=== Scientific notes ===
Onychophora, including P. novaezealandiae-complex, are very difficult to rear in captivity. A German study of P. novaezealandiae-complex had some success keeping specimens alive long enough to birth young.

There is currently no known way to age individuals of P. novaezealandiae-complex, which makes it very difficult to compare individuals and fully understand their life history.

=== Cultural connections ===
The te reo Māori name for velvet worms is ngaokeoke which comes from the word 'ngaoki', to crawl.

When considering a new roading project, the presence of P. otepoti in Caversham Valley gave the location high conservation value. The New Zealand Transport Agency (NZTA) worked with the Department of Conservation, Dunedin City Council and Otago University to translocate any Peripatus impacted by the project, along with ongoing monitoring, management, and habitat enhancement. The discovery of ngaokeoke (P. novaezealandiae-complex) on their farm inspired Taranaki farming couple Damien and Jane Roper to form a partnership with the regional council to legally protect their 2.5 ha of native bush.
