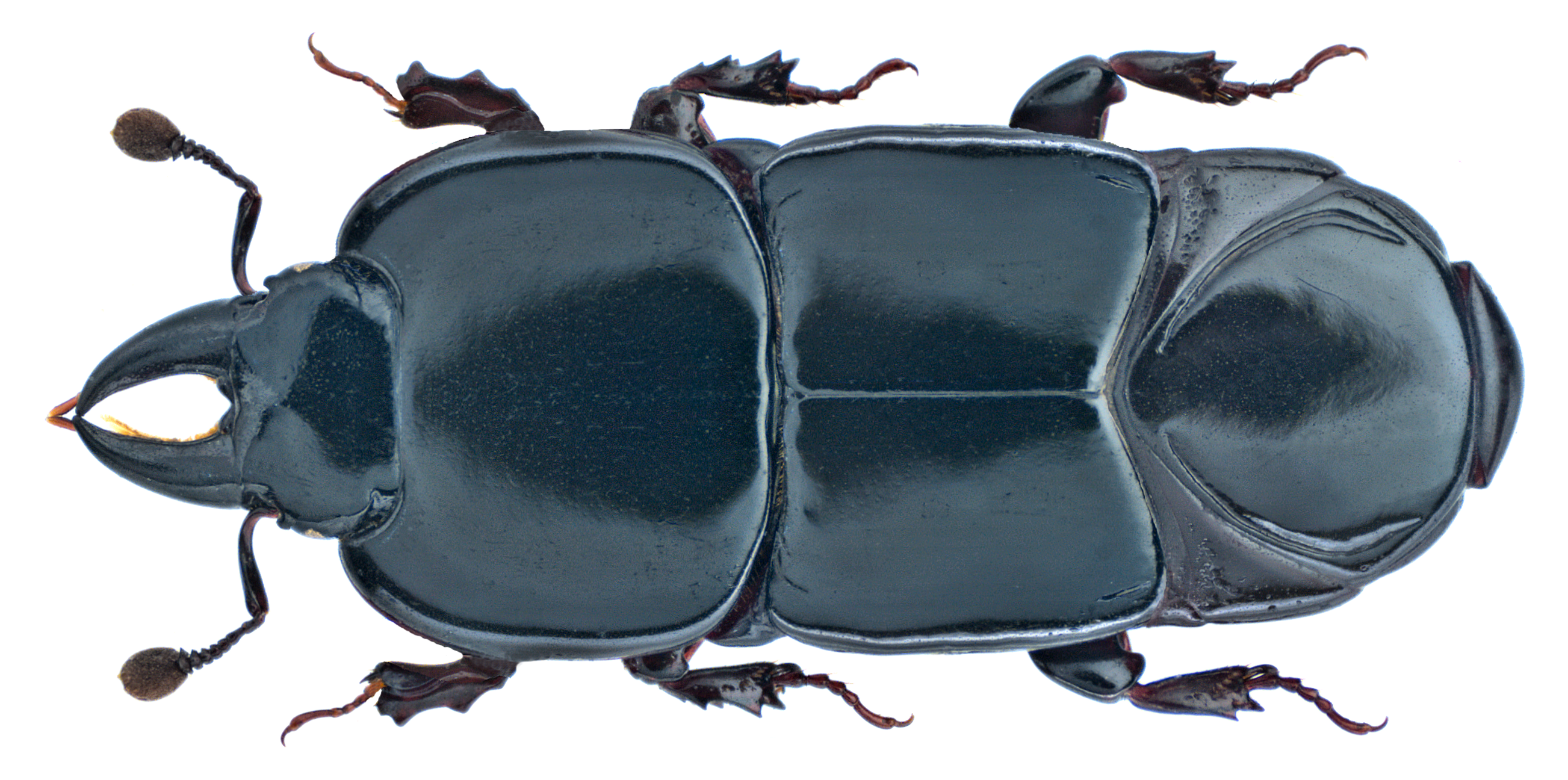

Scientific classification
- Kingdom: Animalia
- Phylum: Arthropoda
- Class: Insecta
- Order: Coleoptera
- Suborder: Polyphaga
- Infraorder: Staphyliniformia
- Family: Histeridae
- Genus: Hololepta
- Species: H. elongata

Binomial name
- Hololepta elongata Erichson, 1834

= Hololepta elongata =

Species of beetle

Hololepta elongata, is a species of clown beetle found in many Oriental countries including, India, Sri Lanka, Indonesia, New Guinea and Philippines.

The average body size is about 8.0 mm.
