= Antenna (zoology) =

Paired appendages used for sensing in arthropods, onychophorans and annelids

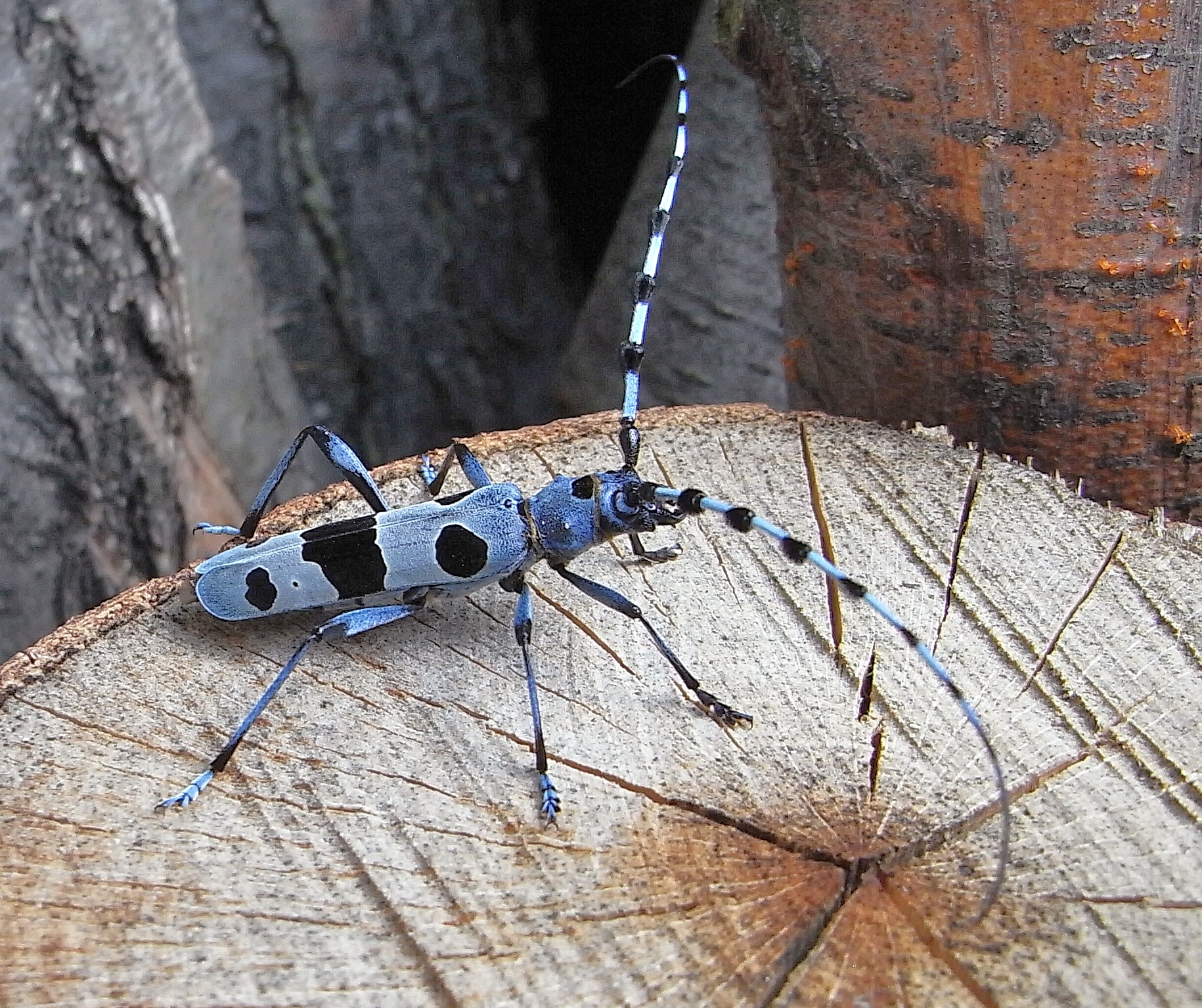
Large antennae on a longhorn beetle Rosalia alpina (Cerambycidae)

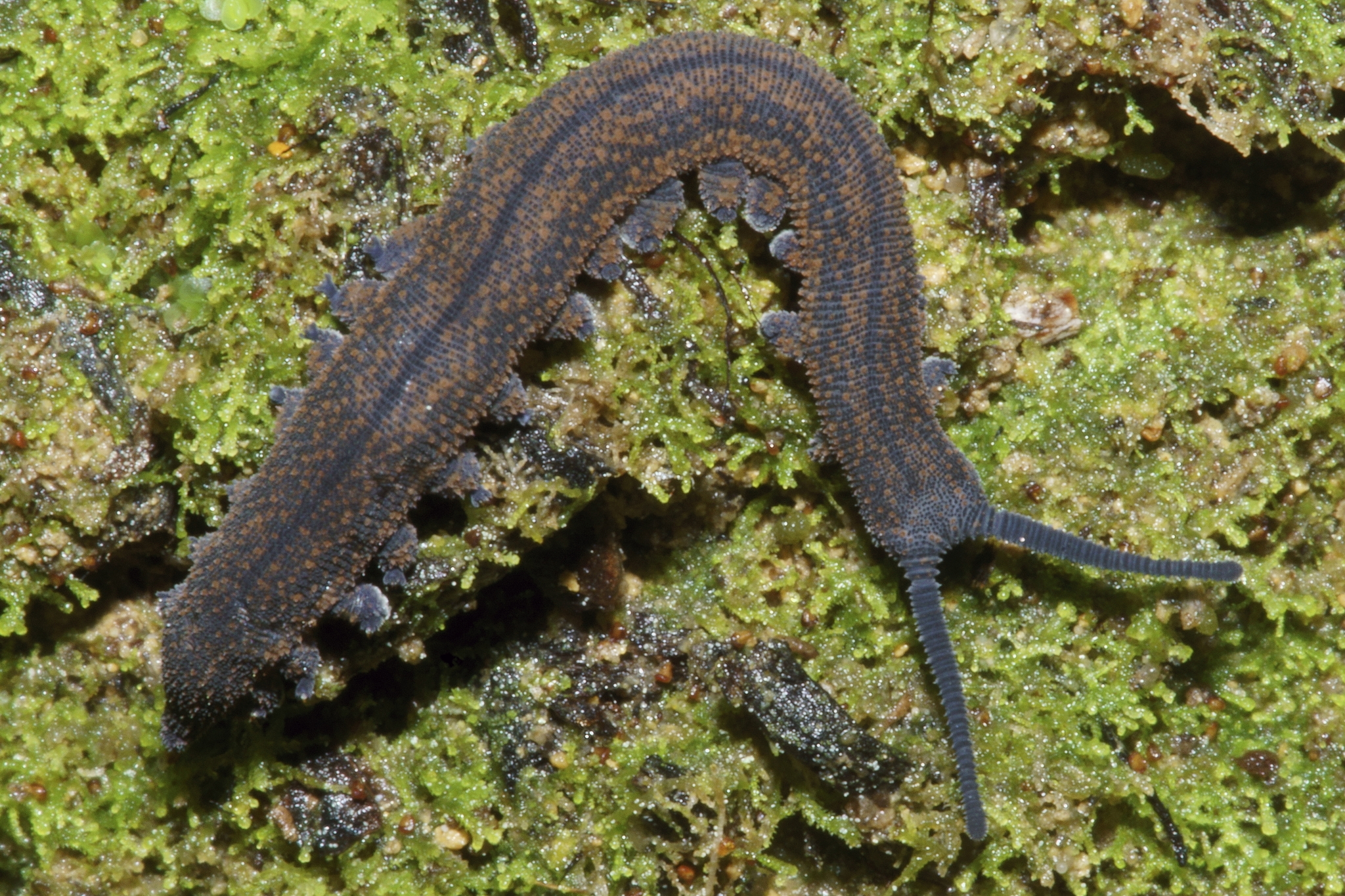
Large antennae in a peripatopsid velvet worm Peripatoides novaezealandiae

An antenna (plural: antennae) is one of a pair of appendages used for sensing in arthropods and onychophorans. Antennae are sometimes referred to as feelers. Arachnids do not have antennae.

Antennae are connected to the first one or two segments of the arthropod head. They vary widely in form but are always made of one or more jointed segments. While they are typically sensory organs, the exact nature of what they sense and how they sense it is not the same in all groups. Functions may variously include sensing touch, air motion, heat, vibration (sound), and especially smell or taste. Antennae are sometimes modified for other purposes, such as mating, brooding, swimming, and even anchoring the arthropod to a substrate. Larval arthropods have antennae that differ from those of the adult. Many crustaceans, for example, have free-swimming larvae that use their antennae for swimming. Antennae can also locate other group members if the insect lives in a group, like the ant.

Among living arthropods, antennae are found in members of Mandibulata, including Myriapoda (centipedes and millipedes, among others) and Pancrustacea (including Insecta), and are also present in some extinct arthropod groups, such as trilobites and marrellomorphs. The first pair of antennae of mandibulates is thought to be homologous to the pincer or claw-like chelicerae of members of Chelicerata like arachnids, with it being suggested that both (first) antennae and chelicerae developed from grasping appendages found in basal deuteropodan arthropods.

Onychophorans as well as annelids also have antennae, though both of these evolved independently.

== Crustaceans ==
Cutaway diagram of a barnacle, with antennae highlighted by arrow

Crustaceans bear two pairs of antennae. The pair attached to the first segment of the head are called primary antennae or antennules. This pair is generally uniramous, but is biramous in crabs and lobsters and remipedes. The pair attached to the second segment are called secondary antennae or simply antennae. The second antennae are plesiomorphically biramous, but many species later evolved uniramous pairs. The second antennae may be significantly reduced (e.g. remipedes) or apparently absent (e.g. barnacles).

The subdivisions of crustacean antennae have many names, including flagellomeres (a shared term with insects), annuli, articles, and segments. The terminal ends of crustacean antennae have two major categorizations: segmented and flagellate. An antenna is considered segmented if each of the annuli is separate from those around it and has individual muscle attachments. Flagellate antennae, on the other hand, have muscle attachments only around the base, acting as a hinge for the flagellum—a flexible string of annuli with no muscle attachment.

There are several notable non-sensory uses of antennae in crustaceans. Many crustaceans have a mobile larval stage called a nauplius, which is characterized by its use of antennae for swimming. Barnacles, a highly modified crustacean, use their antennae to attach to rocks and other surfaces. The second antennae in the burrowing Hippoidea and Corystidae have setae that interlock to form a tube or "snorkel" which funnels filtered water over the gills.

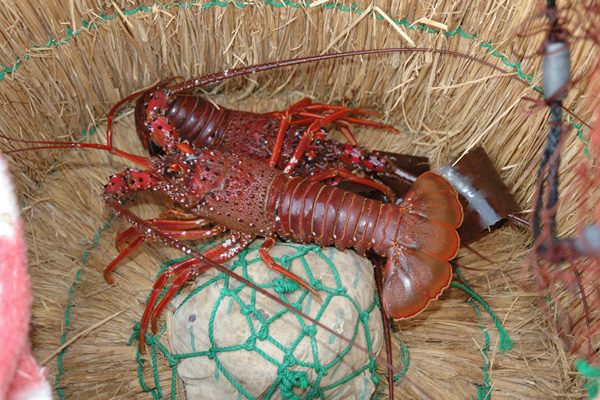
A spiny lobster, showing the enlarged second antennae

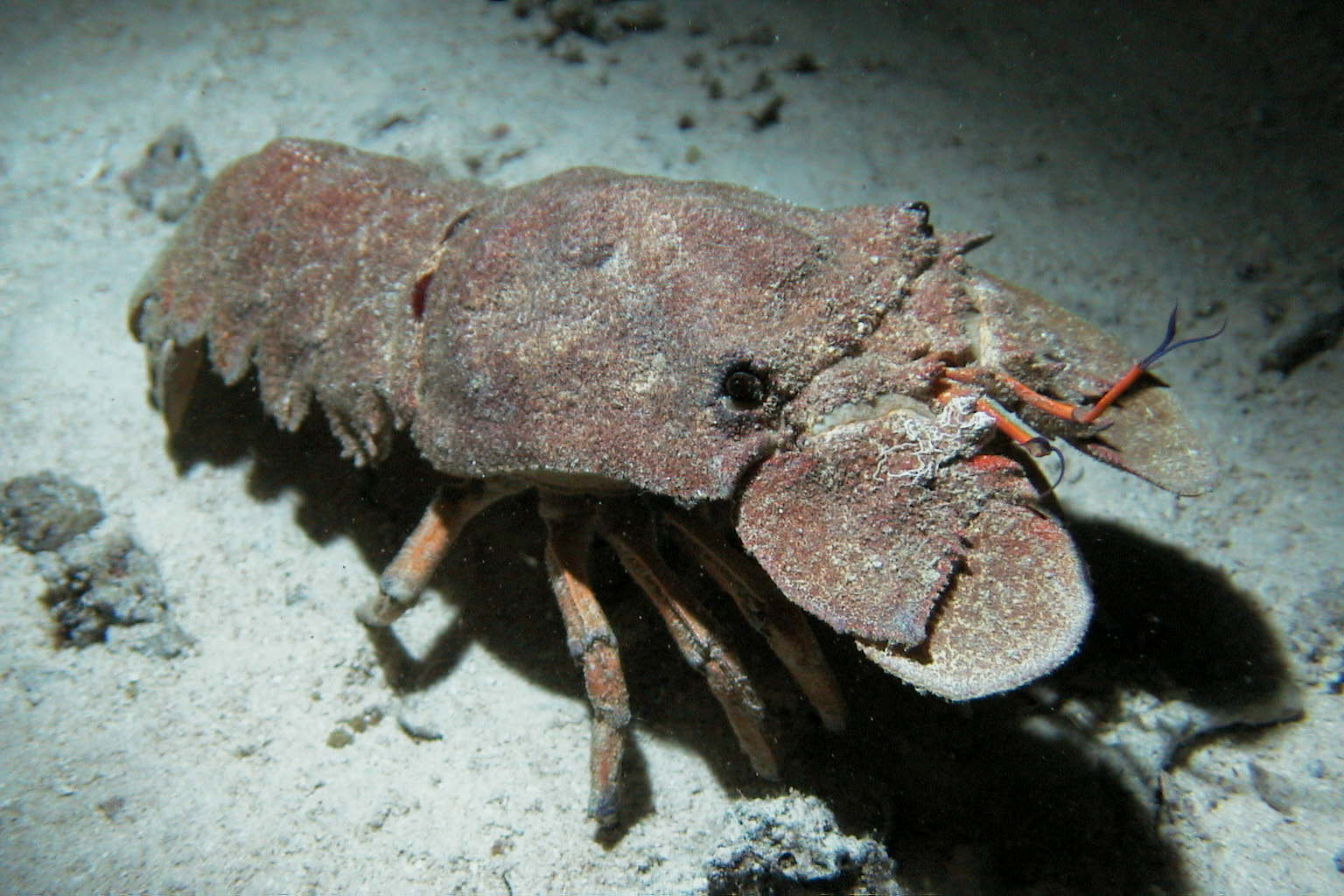
The large flattened plates in front of the eyes of a slipper lobster are the modified second antennae.

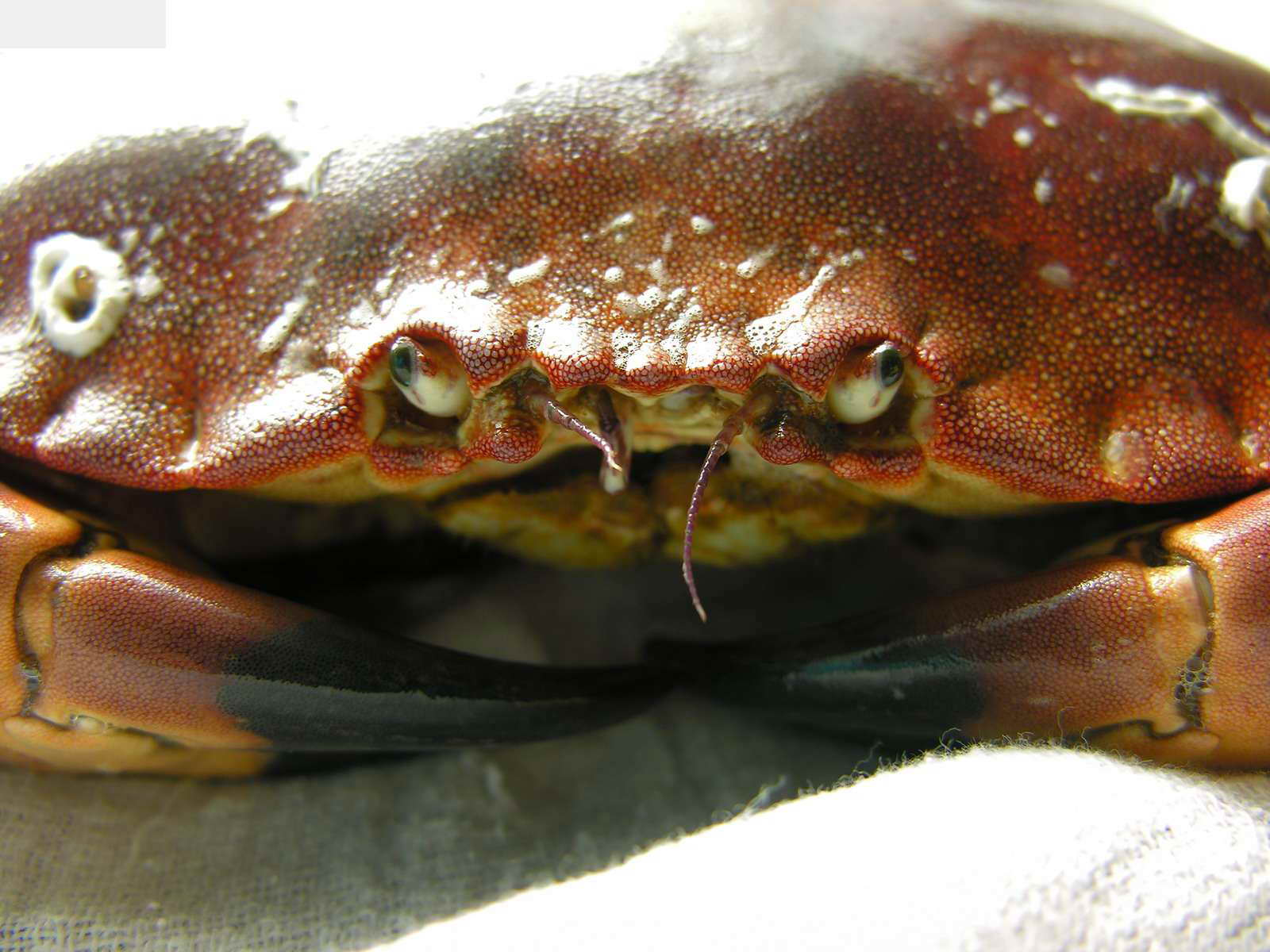
The crab Cancer pagurus, showing its reduced antennae

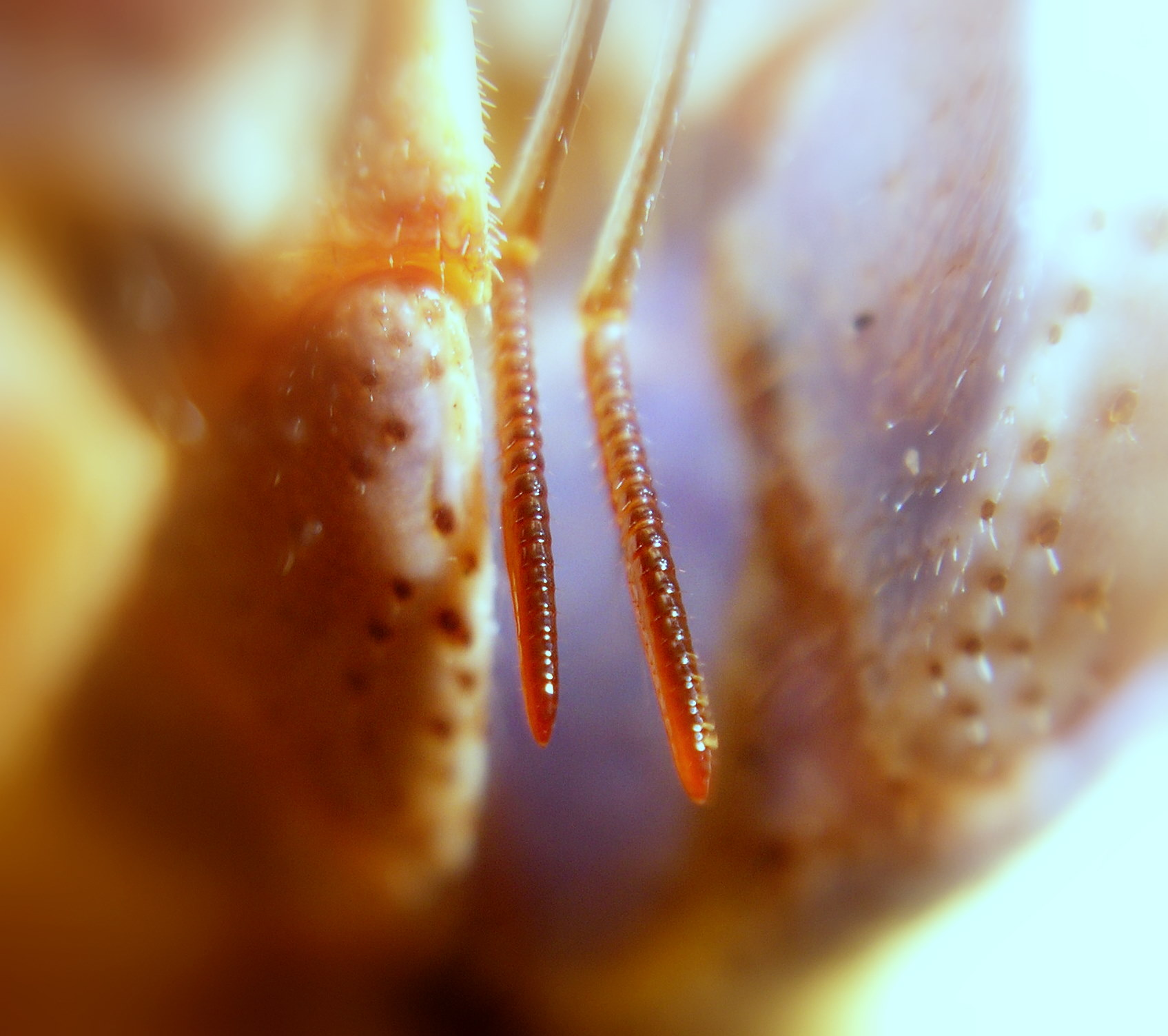
Antennules of the Caribbean hermit crab

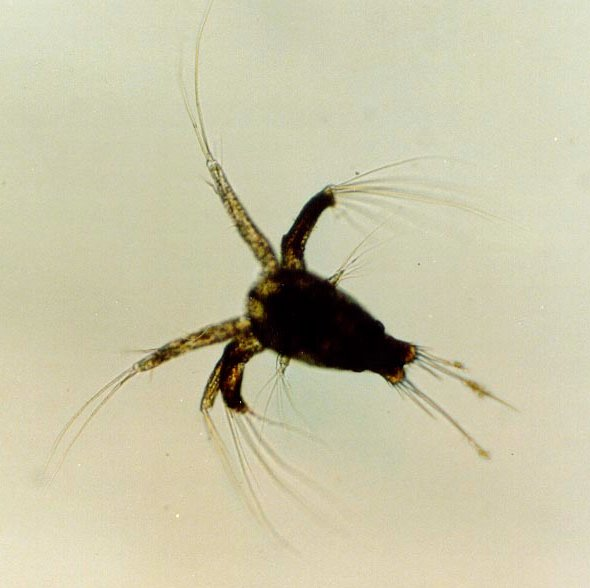
The nauplius larvae of a shrimp with antennae used for swimming

Examples of crustacean antennae
	Copepoda	Isopoda	Amphipoda	Decapoda	Decapoda	Remipedia	Cirripedia
Primary antennae							
Secondary antennae							

== Insects ==
Terms used to describe shapes of insect antennae

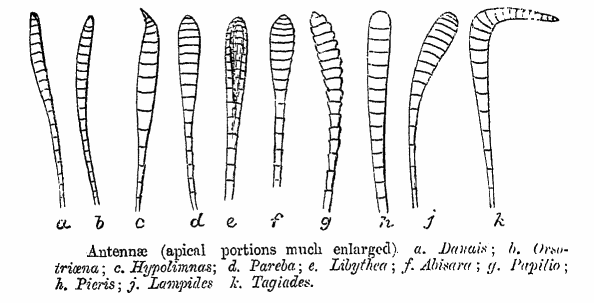
Antennal shape in the Lepidoptera from C. T. Bingham (1905)

Some claim insects evolved from prehistoric crustaceans, and they have secondary antennae like crustaceans, but not primary antennae. Antennae are the primary olfactory sensors of insects and are accordingly well-equipped with a wide variety of sensilla (singular: sensillum). Paired, mobile, and segmented, they are located between the eyes on the forehead. Embryologically, they represent the appendages of the second head segment.

All insects have antennae, however they may be greatly reduced in the larval forms. Amongst the non-insect classes of the Hexapoda, both Collembola and Diplura have antenna, but Protura do not.

=== Structure ===
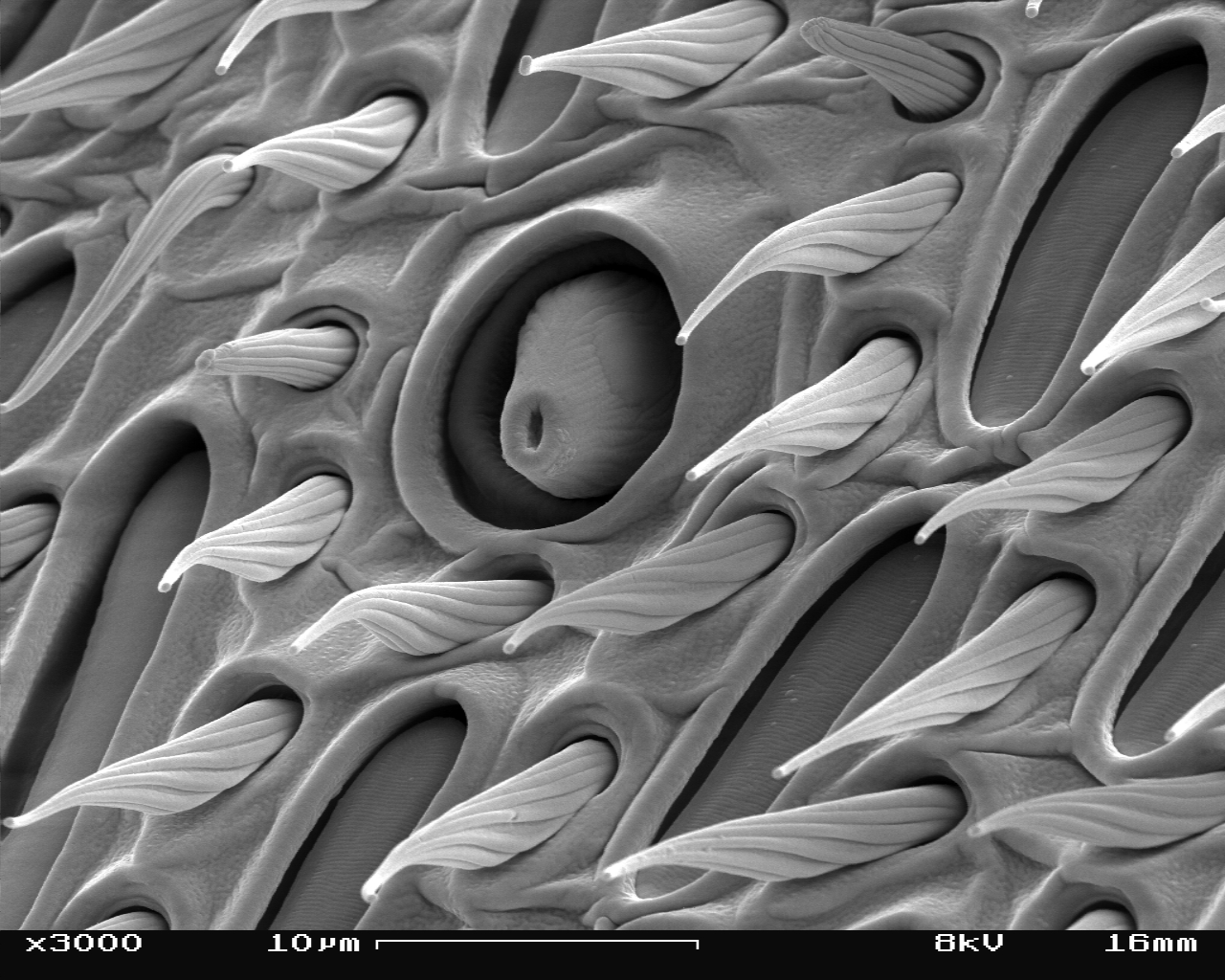
Electron micrograph of antenna surface detail of a wasp (Vespula vulgaris)

The three basic segments of the typical insect antenna are the scape or scapus (base), the pedicel or pedicellus (stem), and finally the flagellum, which often comprises many units known as flagellomeres. The pedicel (the second segment) contains the Johnston's organ which is a collection of sensory cells.

True flagellomeres are connected by membranous linkage that permits movement, though the flagellum of "true" insects does not have any intrinsic muscles. Some other Arthropoda do however have intrinsic muscles throughout the flagellum. Such groups include the Symphyla, Collembola and Diplura. In many true insects, especially the more primitive groups such as Thysanura and Blattodea, the flagellum partly or entirely consists of a flexibly connected string of small ring-shaped annuli. The annuli are not true flagellomeres, and in a given insect species the number of annuli generally is not as consistent as the number of flagellomeres in most species.

In many beetles and in the chalcidoid wasps, the apical flagellomeres form a club shape, called the clava. The collective term for the segments between the club and the antennal base is the funicle; traditionally in describing beetle anatomy, the term "funicle" refers to the segments between the club and the scape. However, traditionally in working on wasps the funicle is taken to comprise the segments between the club and the pedicel.

Quite commonly the funicle beyond the pedicel is quite complex in Endopterygota such as beetles, moths and Hymenoptera, and one common adaptation is the ability to fold the antenna in the middle, at the joint between the pedicel and the flagellum. This gives an effect like a "knee bend", and such an antenna is said to be geniculate. Geniculate antennae are common in the Coleoptera and Hymenoptera. They are important for insects like ants that follow scent trails, for bees and wasps that need to "sniff" the flowers that they visit, and for beetles such as Scarabaeidae and Curculionidae that need to fold their antennae away when they self-protectively fold up all their limbs in defensive attitudes.

Because the funicle is without intrinsic muscles, it generally must move as a unit, in spite of being articulated. However, some funicles are complex and very mobile. For example, the Scarabaeidae have lamellate antennae that can be folded tightly for safety or spread openly for detecting odours or pheromones. The insect manages such actions by changes in blood pressure, by which it exploits elasticity in walls and membranes in the funicles, which are in effect erectile.

In the groups with more uniform antennae, all segments are called antennomeres. Some groups have a simple or variously modified apical or subapical bristle called an arista (this may be especially well-developed in various Diptera).

=== Functions ===
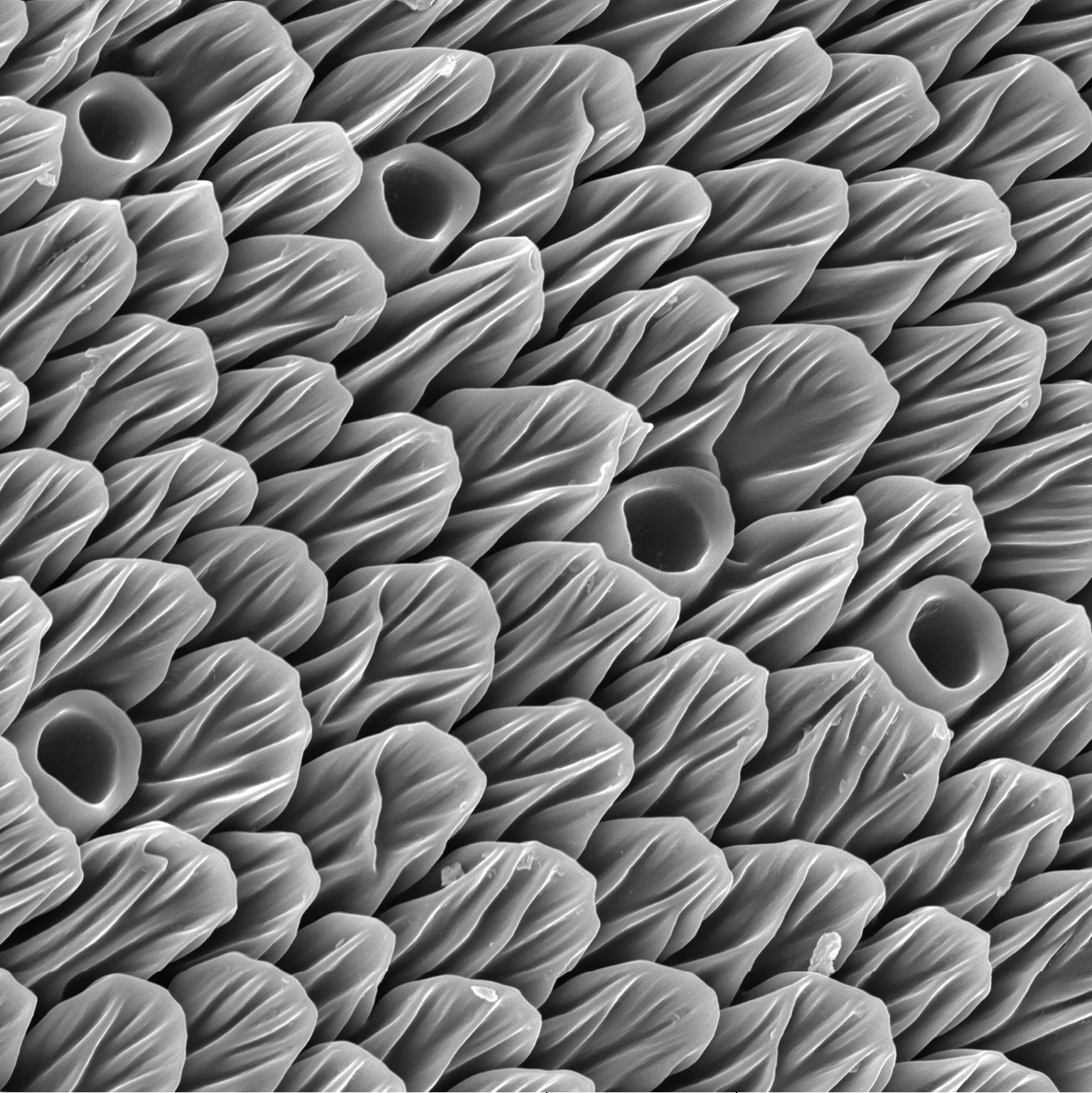
Olfactory receptors (scales and holes) on the antenna of the butterfly Aglais io, electron micrograph

Olfactory receptors on the antennae bind to free-floating molecules, such as water vapour, and odours including pheromones. The neurons that possess these receptors signal this binding by sending action potentials down their axons to the antennal lobe in the brain. From there, neurons in the antennal lobes connect to mushroom bodies that identify the odour. The sum of the electrical potentials of the antennae to a given odour can be measured using an electroantennogram.

In the monarch butterfly, antennae are necessary for proper time-compensated solar compass orientation during migration. Antennal clocks exist in monarchs, and they are likely to provide the primary timing mechanism for sun compass orientation.

In the African cotton leafworm, antennae have an important function in signaling courtship. Specifically, antennae are required for males to answer the female mating call. Although females do not require antennae for mating, a mating that resulted from a female without antennae was abnormal.

In the diamondback moth, antennae serve to gather information about a host plant's taste and odor. After the desired taste and odor has been identified, the female moth will deposit her eggs onto the plant. Giant swallowtail butterflies also rely on antenna sensitivity to volatile compounds to identify host plants. It was found that females are actually more responsive with their antenna sensing, most likely because they are responsible for oviposition on the correct plant.

In the crepuscular hawk moth (Manduca sexta), antennae aid in flight stabilization. Similar to halteres in Dipteran insects, the antennae transmit coriolis forces through the Johnston's organ that can then be used for corrective behavior. A series of low-light, flight stability studies in which moths with flagellae amputated near the pedicel showed significantly decreased flight stability over those with intact antennae. To determine whether there may be other antennal sensory inputs, a second group of moths had their antennae amputated and then re-attached, before being tested in the same stability study. These moths showed slightly decreased performance from intact moths, indicating there are possibly other sensory inputs used in flight stabilization. Re-amputation of the antennae caused a drastic decrease in flight stability to match that of the first amputated group.

== Onychophorans ==
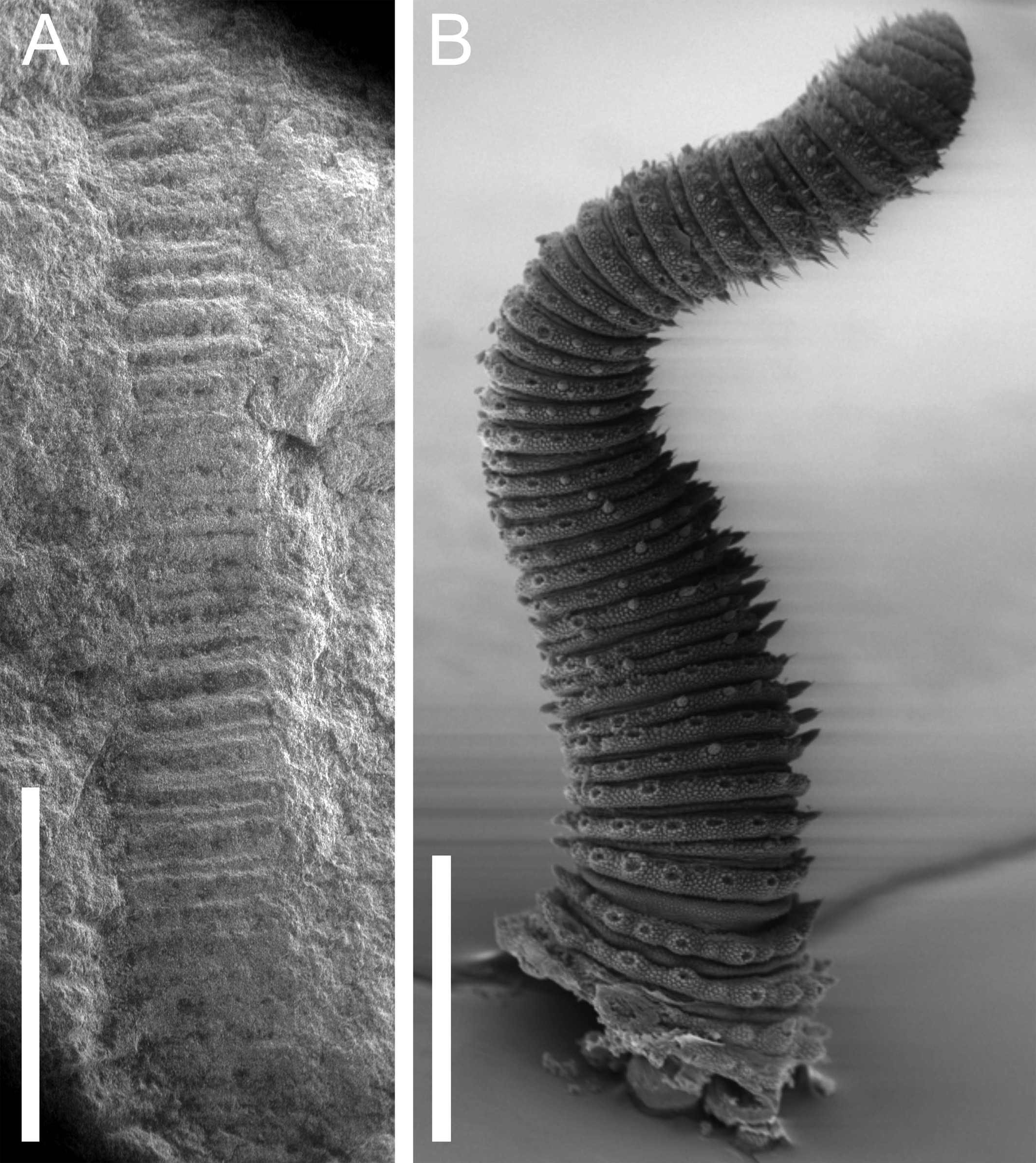
the antenna of an extant and extinct velvet worm

Onychophorans, animals closely related to arthropods, have a pair of antennae on the first segment of their head. These antennae are not homologous to those of arthropods, and they are thought to have chemosensory and mechanoceptory function.

== Annelids ==
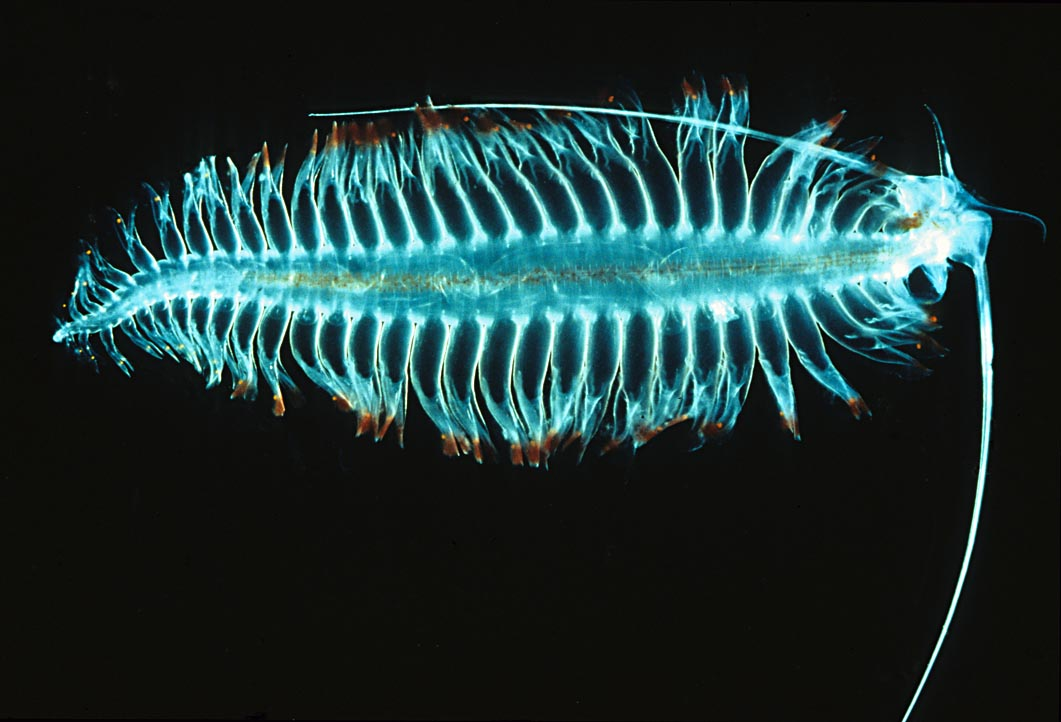
A specimen of the genus Tomopteris, a Phyllodocida

In annelids, antennae are present in some species of Amphinomida and Pleistoannelida. Differently to arthropods and onychophorans, the antennae can also be odd in number, for example, the amphinomid Eurythoe complanata has three of them.
