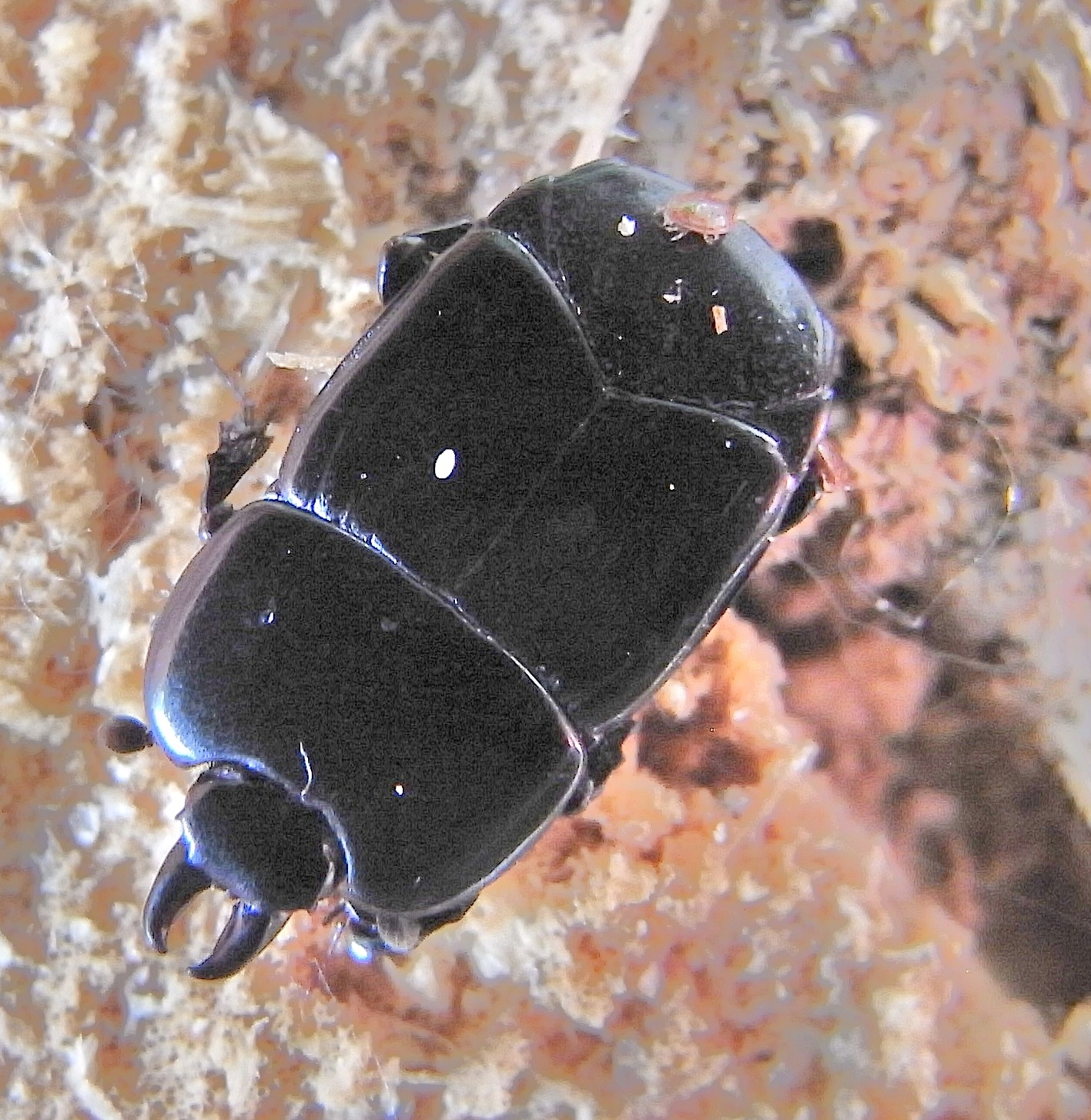
- Hololepta plana

Scientific classification
- Domain: Eukaryota
- Kingdom: Animalia
- Phylum: Arthropoda
- Class: Insecta
- Order: Coleoptera
- Suborder: Polyphaga
- Infraorder: Staphyliniformia
- Family: Histeridae
- Genus: Hololepta
- Species: H. plana

Binomial name
- Hololepta plana (Sulzer, 1776)

= Hololepta plana =

Species of beetle

Hololepta plana is a beetle belonging to the Histeridae family.
