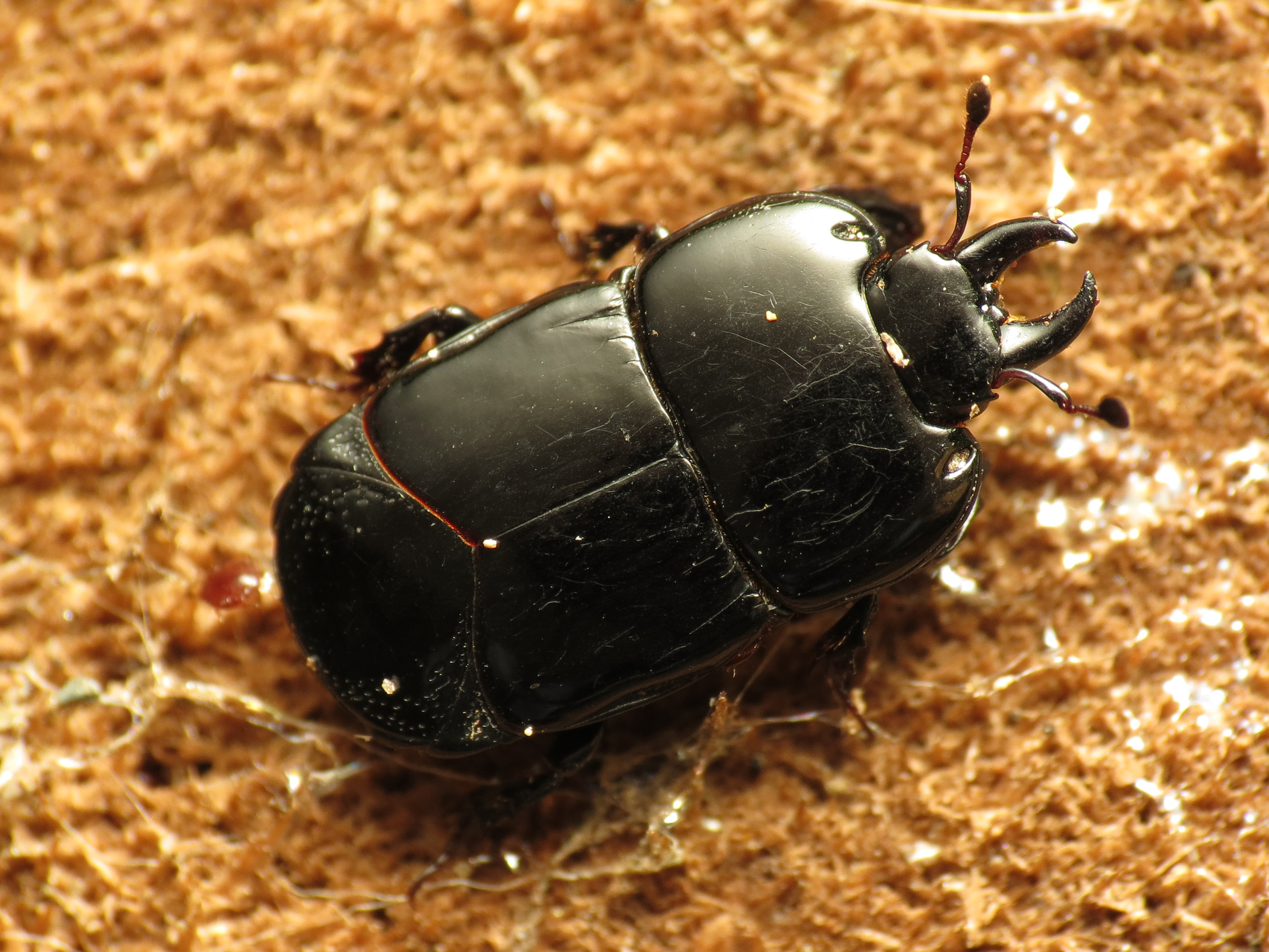

Scientific classification
- Domain: Eukaryota
- Kingdom: Animalia
- Phylum: Arthropoda
- Class: Insecta
- Order: Coleoptera
- Suborder: Polyphaga
- Infraorder: Staphyliniformia
- Family: Histeridae
- Genus: Hololepta
- Species: H. aequalis

Binomial name
- Hololepta aequalis Say, 1825

= Hololepta aequalis =

Species of beetle

Hololepta aequalis is a species of beetle belonging to the Histeridae family. It is found in North American countries such as Canada and the United States where it lives on an elevation of 525–1,370 metres (1,722–4,495 ft) and feeds on dead poplars. Besides poplars, it also feeds on pines, willows, and tulips (especially Liriodendron tulipifera). Its body is flat and is 8–11.5 millimetres (0.31–0.45 in) long. Its annuli is V-shaped while its palpi is horizontally projecting in front of the head. The species' antennal lobe is under anterior angles of its prothorax while its labrum is free.
