= Hololepta minuta =

Scientific classification
- Kingdom: Animalia
- Phylum: Arthropoda
- Class: Insecta
- Order: Coleoptera
- Suborder: Polyphaga
- Infraorder: Staphyliniformia
- Family: Histeridae
- Genus: Hololepta
- Species: H. minuta

Binomial name
- Hololepta minuta Erichson, 1834

Species of beetle

Hololepta minuta is a species of clown beetle in the family Histeridae. It is found in the Caribbean Sea, Central America, North America, and South America.
