= Hololepta lucida =

Scientific classification
- Kingdom: Animalia
- Phylum: Arthropoda
- Clade: Pancrustacea
- Class: Insecta
- Order: Coleoptera
- Suborder: Polyphaga
- Infraorder: Staphyliniformia
- Family: Histeridae
- Genus: Hololepta
- Species: H. lucida

Binomial name
- Hololepta lucida J. E. LeConte, 1845

Species of beetle

Hololepta lucida is a species of clown beetle in the family Histeridae. It is found in North America.
