= Peripatoides kawekaensis =

Conservation status
- Naturally Uncommon (NZ TCS)

Scientific classification
- Kingdom: Animalia
- Phylum: Onychophora
- Family: Peripatopsidae
- Genus: Peripatoides
- Species: P. kawekaensis

Binomial name
- Peripatoides kawekaensis Trewick, 1998

Species of Peripatopsid velvet worm

Peripatoides kawekaensis is a species of velvet worm in the Peripatopsidae family. This species is ovoviviparous and has 15 pairs of legs. The type locality is in New Zealand's North Island.

== Taxonomy ==
This species was described by Steven A. Trewick in 1998 using material collected at the Hutchinson Reserve in the Hawke's Bay Region. The holotype specimen is held at Museum of New Zealand Te Papa Tongarewa in Wellington.

== Conservation status ==
This species has been classified as having the "At Risk, Naturally Uncommon" conservation status under the New Zealand Threat Classification System.
