= Bill S. Hansson =

Swedish neuroethologist

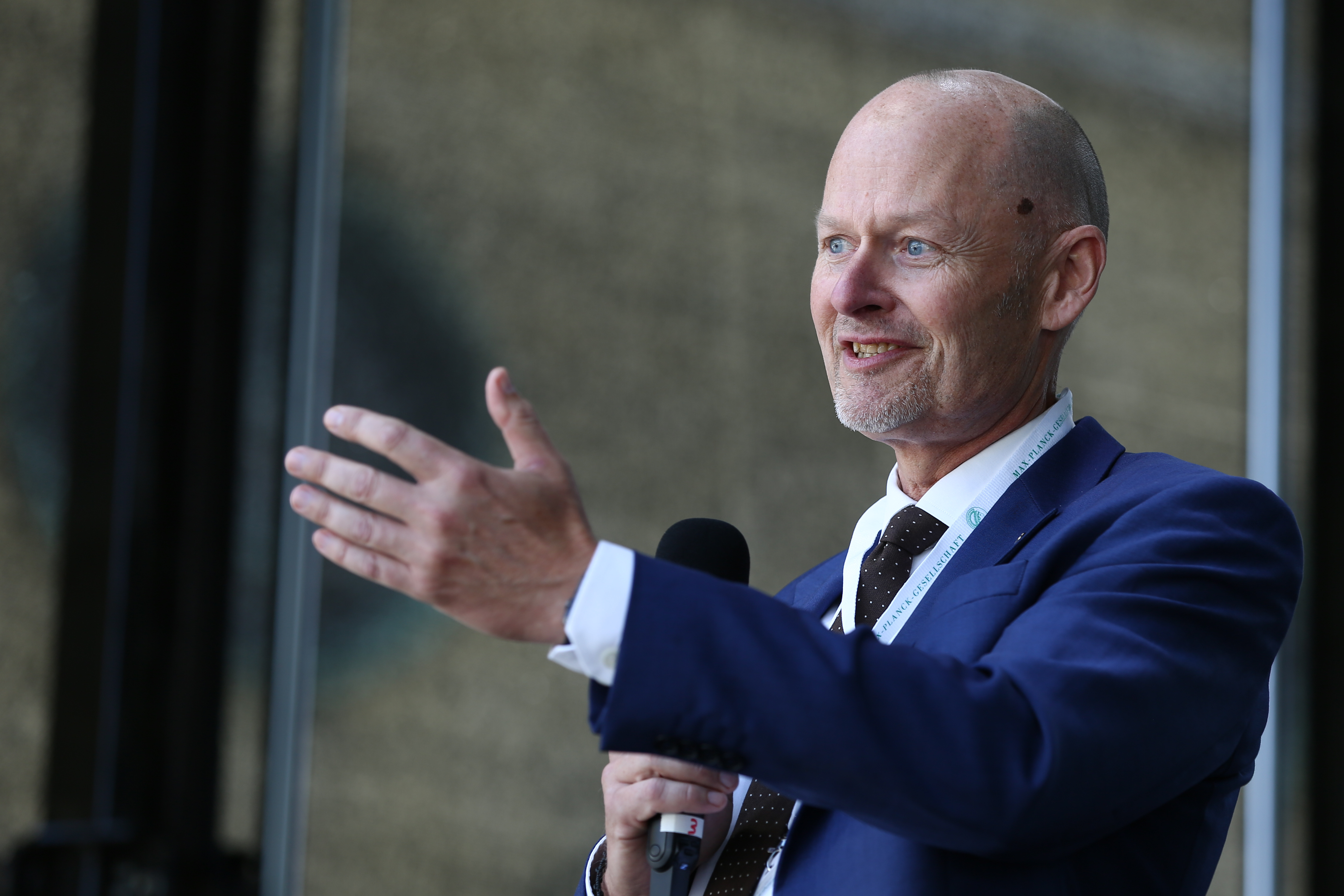
Bill Hansson

Bill S. Hansson (born 1959) is a Swedish neuroethologist. From June 2014 until June 2020, he was vice president of the Max Planck Society.

== Scientific career ==
Hansson studied biology at Lund University where he received a Bachelor of Science degree in biology in 1982. In 1988 he defended his PhD thesis in Ecology. From 1989 to 1990 he worked as postdoc at the University of Arizona and returned 1990 to a junior professorship in Lund. In 1992 he became Associate Professor and from 2000 until 2001 he was a Professor for Chemical Ecology at Lund University (2000). From 2001 he was Professor and Head of the Chemical Ecology department at the Swedish University of Agricultural Sciences (SLU) in Alnarp, Sweden. He also served as vice dean for the Faculty of Landscape Planning, Horticulture, and Agriculture from 2003, until he was appointed Director and Scientific Member at the Max Planck Institute for Chemical Ecology in Jena, Germany in 2006. He was head of the Department of Evolutionary Neuroethology. until his retirement in 2025. Between 2014 and 2020 Hansson also served as Vice President of the Max Planck Society. He is now emeritus Director at the Jena institute. In 2025 he took up the position as Distinguished Professor at the Agricultural Genomics Institute in Shenzhen, Chinese Academy of Agricultural Sciences. He also holds positions as Honorary Professor at the University of Jena, at the Nanjing Agricultural University and at Hainan University, and as emeritus Professor at SLU.

Hansson's research focuses on neuroethological aspects of insect-insect and insect-plant interactions. He is mainly studying insect olfaction, where his central questions are: How is semiochemical information (odors) detected by the antenna and processed in the insect brain, how did these detection and processing systems evolve, and how does olfaction guide insect behavior? He also compares these systems to other land-living arthropods, as the giant robber crab on Christmas Island.

== Awards and honors ==
- The Takasago International Research Award in Olfactory Science 1998
- International Award of the Jean-Marie Delwart Foundation 2000
- Letterstedt Prize of the Royal Swedish Academy of Sciences 2009
- Fellow of the Saxonian Academy of Sciences 2010
- Fellow of the Royal Swedish Academy of Sciences 2011
- Fellow of the Royal Swedish Academy of Agriculture and Forestry
- Honorary Fellow of the Royal Entomological Society 2011
- Elected member of the Academia Europaea 2012
- Elected member of the Finnish Society of Sciences and Letters 2013
- Silverstein-Simeone Award of the International Society of Chemical Ecology 2014
- International Ellis Island Medal of Honor 2016
- Fellow of the African Academy of Sciences 2016
- Honorary Doctorate from the Faculty of Landscape Architecture, Horticulture and Crop Production Science, Swedish University of Agricultural Sciences (SLU)
- Honorary Doctorate from the Czech University of Life Sciences Prague
- In 2017 he became a member of the German Academy of Sciences Leopoldina.
- Gold Medal of the Royal Swedish Academy of Agriculture and Forestry 2021
- Bundesverdienstkreuz 1. Klasse, 2021
- Foreign member of the Chinese Academy of Sciences, 2022
- The Jubilee icipe Achievement Award, Nairobi, Kenya 2022
- Honorary professorship at Nanjing Agricultural University, 2023
- Great Medal of the Swedish University of Agricultural Sciences 2024
- Silver Medal Award of the International Society of Chemical Ecology 2025
- The Chinese Government Friendship Award 2026

== Selected publications (out of ≈450) ==
- Hansson, B. S., Ljungberg, H., Hallberg, E., Löfstedt, C. (1992). Functional specialization of olfactory glomeruli in a moth. Science 256:1313-1315. doi:10.1126/science.1598574
- Schiestl, F.P., Ayasse, M., Paulus, H.F., Löfstedt, C., Hansson, B.S., Ibarra, F., Francke, W. (1999). Orchid pollination by sexual swindle. Nature 399:421-422. doi:10.1038/20829
- Hansson, B.S. (Hrsg.) (1999). Insect Olfaction. Springer Verlag, Heidelberg, ISBN 978-3-540-65034-8
- Stensmyr, M. C., Urru, I., Celander, M., Hansson, B.S. (2002). Rotting smell of dead-horse arum florets. Nature, 420, 625–626. doi:10.1038/420625a
- Wicher, D., Schäfer, R., Bauernfeind, R., Stensmyr, M. C., Heller, R., Heinemann, S. H., Hansson, B. S. (2008). Drosophila odorant receptors are both ligand-gated and cyclic-nucleotide-activated cation channels. Nature, 452(7190), 1007–1011. doi:10.1038/nature06861
- Stökl, J., Strutz, A., Dafni, A., Svatos, A., Doubský, J., Knaden, M., Sachse, S., Hansson, B., Stensmyr, M. C. (2010). A deceptive pollination system targeting drosophilids through olfactory mimicry of yeast. Current Biology, 20, 1846–1852. doi:10.1016/j.cub.2010.09.033
- Grosse-Wilde, E., Kuebler, L., Bucks, S., Vogel, H., Wicher, D., Hansson, B. (2011). Antennal transcriptome of Manduca sexta. Proceedings of the National Academy of Sciences of the United States of America, 108, 7449–7454. doi:10.1073/pnas.1017963108
- Hansson, B., Stensmyr, M. C. (2011). Evolution of insect olfaction. Neuron, 72(5), 698–711. doi:10.1016/j.neuron.2011.11.003
- Stensmyr, M. C., Dweck, H., Farhan, A., Ibba, I., Strutz, A., Mukunda, L., Linz, J., Grabe, V., Steck, K., Lavista Llanos, S., Wicher, D., Sachse, S., Knaden, M., Becher, P. G., Seki, Y., Hansson, B. S. (2012). A conserved dedicated olfactory circuit for detecting harmful microbes in Drosophila. Cell, 151(6), 1345–1357. doi:10.1016/j.cell.2012.09.046
- Chang, H., Cassau, S., Krieger, J., Guo, X., Knaden, M., Kang, L., Hansson, B. S. (2023). A chemical defense deters cannibalism in migratory locusts. Science 380, 6644, 537-543 doi:10.1016/j.cub.2023.11.017
- Jiang, X., Dimitriou, E., Grabe, V., Sun, R., Chang, H., Zhang, Y., Gershenzon, J., Rybak, J., Hansson, B. S., Sachse, S. (2024). Ring-shaped odor coding in the antennal lobe of migratory locusts. Cell 187 (15), 13973-3991.e24 doi:10.1016/j.cell.2024.05.036
- Pal Mahadevan, V., Galagovsky, D., Knaden, M., Hansson, B. S. (2025). Preference for and resistance to a toxic sulfur volatile opens up a unique niche in Drosophila busckii. Nature Communications 16, 767 doi:10.1038/s41467-025-55971-2
- Khallaf, M.A., Hart, D.W., Luo, W. et al. (2026) A queen odour mediates reproductive suppression in a eusocial mammal. Nature 656, 390–398 doi:10.1038/s41586-026-10772-5

== Books ==
- Hansson, B.S. (Hrsg.) (1999). Insect Olfaction. Springer Verlag, Heidelberg, ISBN 978-3-540-65034-8
- Hansson, Bill S. (2022). Smelling to Survive: The Amazing World of Our Sense of Smell. Hero (8 Aug. 2022) (available in 12 languages)
