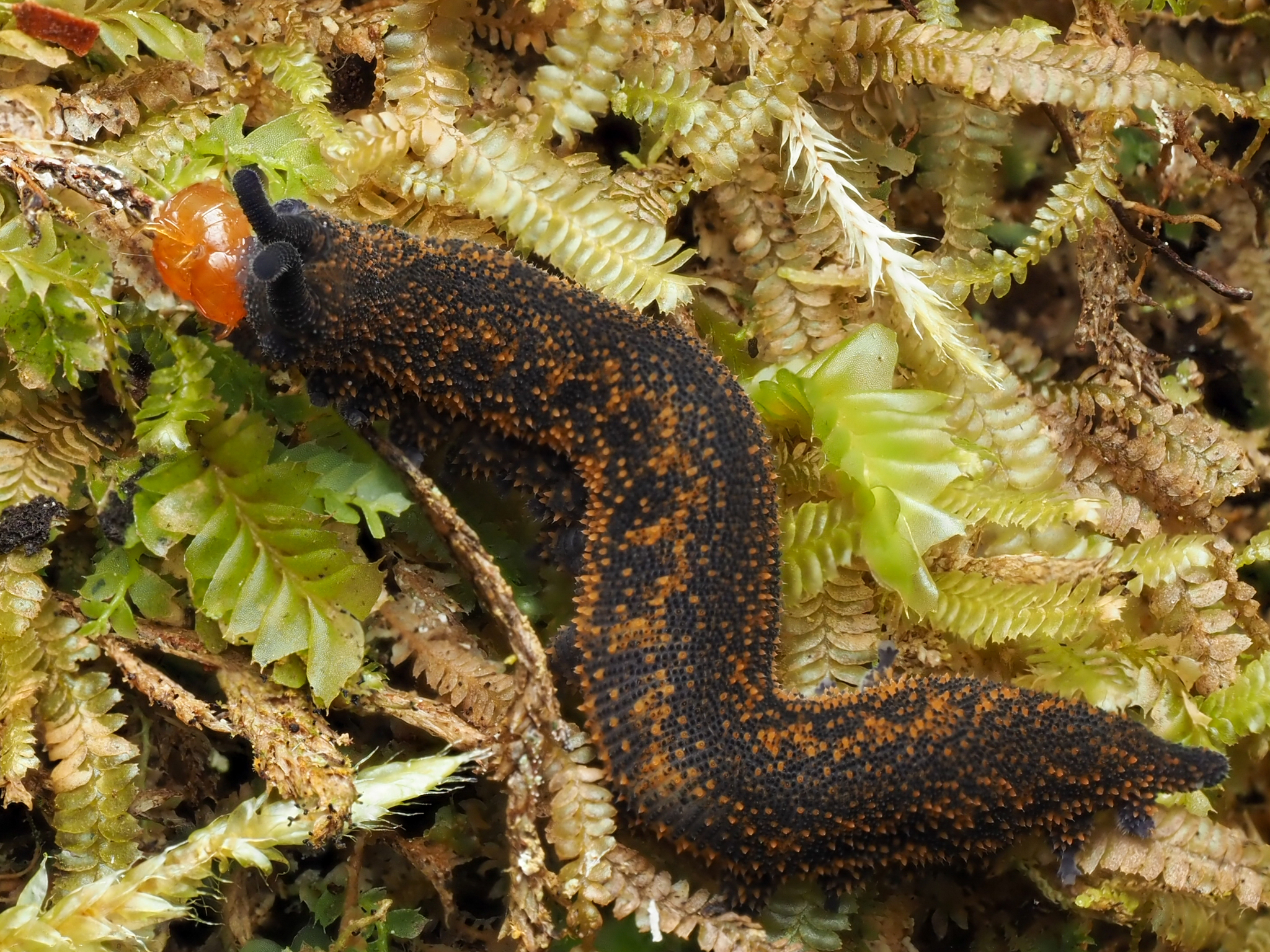
- Peripatoides suteri feeding, on Mount Taranaki, New Zealand

Conservation status
- Vulnerable (IUCN 2.3)

Scientific classification
- Kingdom: Animalia
- Phylum: Onychophora
- Family: Peripatopsidae
- Genus: Peripatoides
- Species: P. suteri

Binomial name
- Peripatoides suteri (Dendy, 1894)

= Peripatoides suteri =

Species of Peripatopsid velvet worm

Peripatoides suteri is a species of velvet worm in the family Peripatopsidae. Like all other species in the genus Peripatoides, this species is ovoviviparous and endemic to New Zealand. This species is notable for featuring 16 pairs of legs, unlike all other species of Peripatoides, which have only 15 leg pairs.

== Discovery and taxonomy ==
This velvet worm was first described in 1894 by the English zoologist Arthur Dendy. He based the original description of this velvet worm on three specimens collected from Stratford on the North Island of New Zealand. He originally described this velvet worm under the name Peripatus novæ-zealandiæ var. suteri, as a variety of Peripatus novæ-zealandiæ with 16 leg pairs, unlike the usual variety with 15 leg pairs. He did not designate any type material explicitly. In 1900, he referred to this velvet worm as a separate species under the name Peripatus suteri. In 1901, the French zoologist Eugène Louis Bouvier placed this species in the genus Peripatoides instead of the genus Peripatus.

== Distribution ==
This species was once thought to have a narrow distribution near the type locality in the Taranaki region on the west coast of the North Island of New Zealand. Specimens assigned to this species, however, have since been found elsewhere on the North Island. Specimens have been found not only around Lake Rotokare and Dawson Falls in the Taranaki region but also as far east as Whakapapa Village and the Central Plateau and as far north as the Coromandel Peninsula and the Waitākere Ranges.

== Phylogeny ==
A phylogenetic analysis of the genus Peripatoides based on molecular data places all specimens of P. suteri collected from several sites throughout its range in a single clade distinct from all the other clades representing other species in a phylogenetic tree. This analysis also identifies the species P. indigo as the closest relative of P. suteri. The species P. indigo is found on the northwest corner of the South Island of New Zealand.

== Description ==
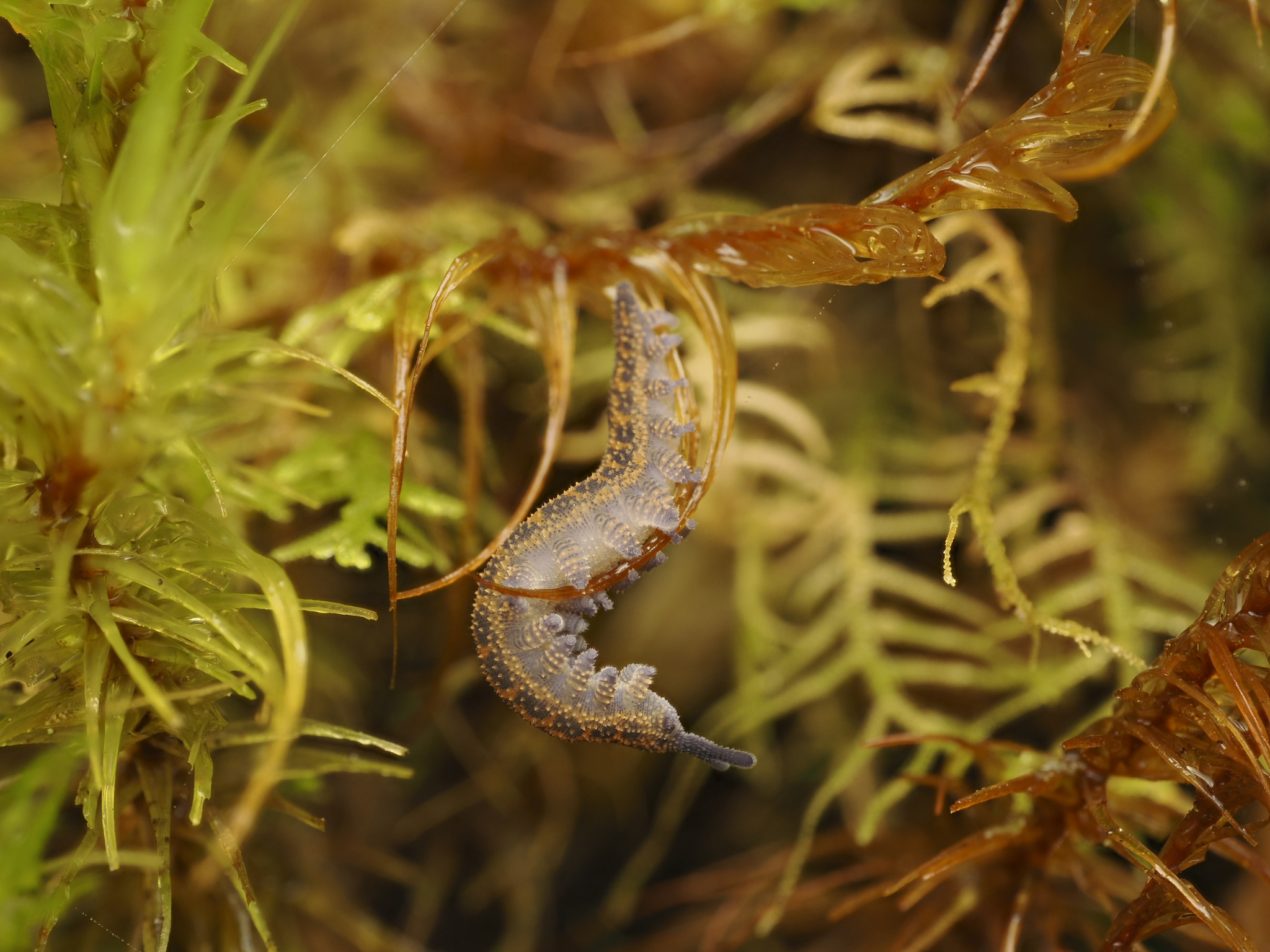
Peripatoides suteri juvenile

Like all ngaokeoke (velvet worms) P. suteri varies in length depending on age or activity, but averages about 33 mm in length. The dorsal surface is dark blue densely covered with an irregular arrangement of orange brown papillae. The antennae are dark blue. The lateral and ventral surfaces of the legs as well as the ventral surface of the body are grey. The genital opening is blue-grey.

This species features 16 pairs of legs with three or four spinous pads and four (rarely three) distal papillae on each foot. The nephridial tubercle on the fourth and fifth leg pairs is located on the third spinous pad. This tubercle completely divides this pad on the fifth leg pair and partially (rarely completely) divides this pad on the fourth leg pair. Each antenna features 27 to 32 rings, counting from the first complete ring by the eye. The dorsal papillae behind the final pair of legs feature six to ten rows of scales, with six as the most common number, counting from the base to the apex of each papilla.

This species shares many traits with other species in the genus Peripatoides, such as the location of the nephridial tubercle on the fourth and fifth leg pairs. This species can be distinguished from all other species in this genus, however, based on the number of legs: Whereas P. suteri features 16 leg pairs, all other species in this genus have only 15 leg pairs. Furthermore, P. suteri usually features four distal foot papillae, whereas its closest relative P. indigo features five, and all other species in this genus usually feature only three.

== Conservation ==
This species is listed as Vulnerable on the IUCN Red List.
