= Hololepta quadridentata =

Scientific classification
- Kingdom: Animalia
- Phylum: Arthropoda
- Clade: Pancrustacea
- Class: Insecta
- Order: Coleoptera
- Suborder: Polyphaga
- Infraorder: Staphyliniformia
- Family: Histeridae
- Genus: Hololepta
- Species: H. quadridentata

Binomial name
- Hololepta quadridentata (Olivier, 1789)

Species of beetle

Hololepta quadridentata is a species of clown beetle in the family Histeridae. It is found in Central America, North America, and South America.
