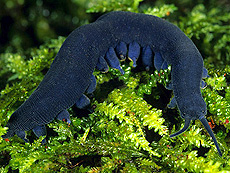
- Female P. indigo

Conservation status
- Vulnerable (IUCN 2.3)

- Naturally Uncommon (NZ TCS)

Scientific classification
- Kingdom: Animalia
- Phylum: Onychophora
- Family: Peripatopsidae
- Genus: Peripatoides
- Species: P. indigo

Binomial name
- Peripatoides indigo Ruhberg, 1985

= Peripatoides indigo =

Species of Peripatopsid velvet worm

Peripatoides indigo, the indigo velvet worm, is a species of velvet worm in the family Peripatopsidae. The Māori name for the velvet worm is ngaokeoke, from the Māori word 'ngaoki', to crawl.

== Description ==
The Peripatoides indigo can grow up to 9 cm long, and it has a deep blue/purple coloured velvety appearance - hence the common name of this group. This is due to the many tiny papillae present on their skin surface, which also have fine bristles. Its head bears two large antennae, and also a set of small oral papillae which secrete jets of a paralytic slime used in stalking and hunting prey. It has 15 pairs of short legs, which have a hook-shaped claw at the end. This genus also all have a hydrostatic skeleton, a muscular body filled with fluid similar to annelids, but also a chitinous exoskeleton, like the arthropods. Therefore, as the P. indigo continually grows, it must undergo ecydysis (moulting) every few weeks to enable this. The many legs walking in co-ordination together can cover a distance of 200mm in about a minute, slow in comparison to species elsewhere The velvet worms have simple eyes, however it is primarily just for detecting light rather than detailed sight - this is mainly used to determine whether it is night or day, enabling it to come out at night to avoid desiccation P. indigo breathes through small pores in the side, called spiracles. These spiracles are usually able to be opened and closed in response to the environment both inside and outside the organism, but in the P. indigo this is not the case. The spiracles are permanently open, therefore desiccation (drying out) is an issue – hence the P. indigo chooses damp, humid habitats underneath rocks and rotting logs.

== Distribution and habitat ==
Peripatoides indigo has been found in the Nelson region at the top of the South Island, New Zealand. Velvet worms are generally found in forested areas, however this species have also been observed in places such as urban parks, scrub areas and gardens. The main habitat is within and under logs, under stones, and in leaf litter, as these are locations which are damp and humid, ideal for creatures which cannot control their moisture loss. The P. indigo is also nocturnal, again to reduce fluid loss. Males have been shown to 'scout' locations of new habitats, then emitting chemical signals to attract females. This enables females to conserve energy they could otherwise use in reproduction. Peripatoides indigo is a predator, consuming other invertebrates such as beetle larvae, spiders, isopods and other litter insects. They also consume soil for its nutrient content, and after moulting, eat its own shed skin to reduce wastage of nutrients. These animals paralyse their prey by shooting jets of a glue-like slime from their oral papillae, rendering their prey immobile, and allowing them to get close enough to inject their digestive saliva into the organism and suck out the liquefied tissue. The New Zealand species of velvet worms can shoot this substance at a range of several centimeters, and also use this when defending themselves. The P. indigo could be predated on by introduced birds, rats and the like, however, this cannot be known for sure, as there is no recorded observation of these events.

== Reproduction ==
Peripatoides indigo, like other species of the genus Peripatiodes, is ovoviviparous, meaning it lays eggs which hatch internally, and then give birth to live young. P. indigo is estimated to have a lifespan of up to five years, and females can produce 10-20 offspring per year. The males deposit a spermatophore on the female's body, which she then absorbs. This then travels to the eggs, or is stored until it is needed. The eggs then hatch internally and the female gives birth to live young, which look like smaller versions of the adult. There is no record of parental care once the young are born, and the females may even eat its own young.

== Conservation ==
This species has been classified as having the "At Risk, Naturally Uncommon" conservation status under the New Zealand Threat Classification System. The species is also listed as Vulnerable on the IUCN Red List. It is thought to be threatened mainly by habitat destruction - forest clearing, removing logs and rocks in which they live, or other events such as fires or over collection of species, particularly adult females. Other threats include predation, likely by introduced species (birds, rats etc.).
