= Electroantennography =

Electroantennography or EAG is a technique for measuring the average output of an insect antenna to its brain for a given odor. It is commonly used in electrophysiology while studying the function of the olfactory pathway in insects. The technique was invented in 1957 by German biologist Dietrich Schneider and shares similarities with electro-olfactography.

== Method ==
Electroantennography is usually performed either by removing an antenna from the insect and inserting two chloride silver wires for contact onto the two ends and amplifying the voltage between them while applying an odor puff to see a deflection as in the figure, or by leaving the animal intact and inserting a ground wire (silver/silver chloride) or a glass electrode filled with a buffer solution to some part of the body, usually inserted into an eye, and another to the tip of the antenna. A large bore glass electrode can also be placed directly over the tip of the antenna, such as in Drosophila melanogaster (fruit fly) antenna recordings. The latter method is useful if one is doing an experiment on the animal as a whole while doing the antennogram.

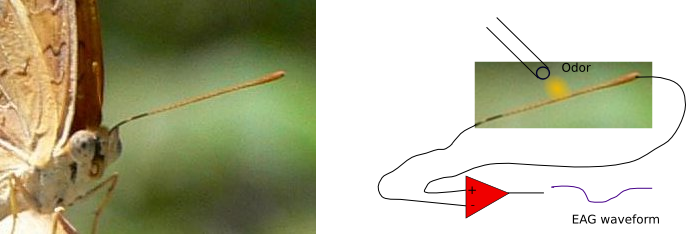
Set-up for antennogram

The technique is widely applied in screening of insect pheromones by examining the responses to fractions of a compound mixture separated using chromatography. Usually, the wire inserted into the antenna is a thin silver wire that is chlorided in bleach. This is an older practice. Commonly, tungsten wires that have been chemically sharpened are inserted into a single neuron in the antenna. Further detailed examination of the odor response at the olfactory sensory level can be done by sensilla recording.
