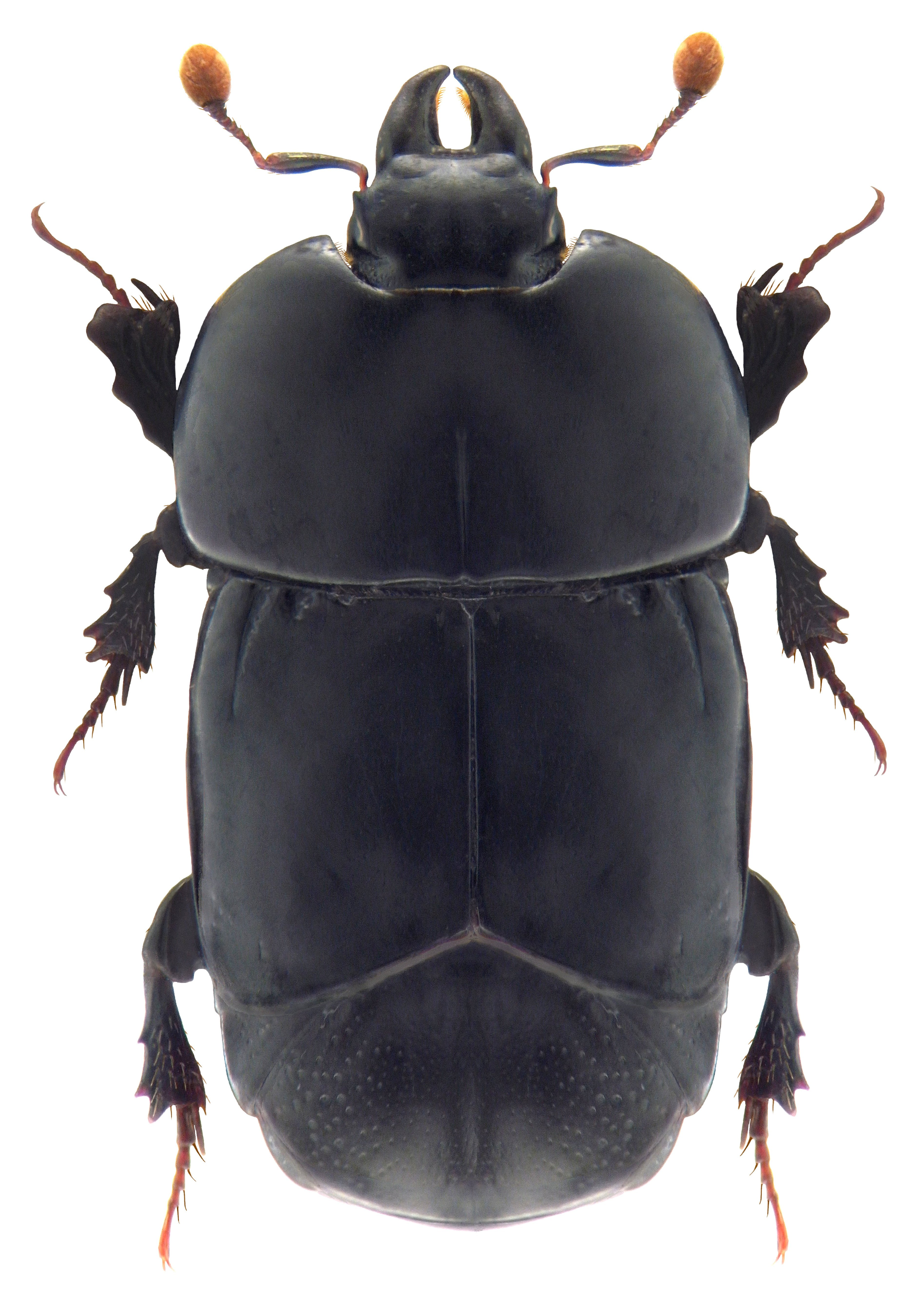
- Hololepta plana

Scientific classification
- Kingdom: Animalia
- Phylum: Arthropoda
- Class: Insecta
- Order: Coleoptera
- Suborder: Polyphaga
- Infraorder: Staphyliniformia
- Family: Histeridae
- Subfamily: Histerinae
- Tribe: Hololeptini
- Genus: Hololepta; Paykull, 1811

= Hololepta =

Genus of beetles

Hololepta is a genus of clown beetles in the family Histeridae. There are at least 100 described species in Hololepta.

== See also ==
- List of Hololepta species
