= Epiperipatus cratensis =

Scientific classification
- Kingdom: Animalia
- Phylum: Onychophora
- Family: Peripatidae
- Genus: Epiperipatus
- Species: E. cratensis

Binomial name
- Epiperipatus cratensis Brito et al. 2010

Species of velvet worm

Epiperipatus cratensis is a species of velvet worm in the family Peripatidae. This species is found in northeastern Brazil. This velvet worm is notable as a small species of Epiperipatus (reaching only 34 mm in length) with many legs (as many as 34 pairs in females and 33 pairs in males).

== Discovery, distribution, and habitat ==
This species was first described in 2010 by a team of biologists led by the zoologist Samuel V. Brito. They based the original description of this species on a male holotype and three paratypes (two males and one female). These specimens were collected during the rainy season in 2007 from the banks of a river in a tropical humid forest in the Chapada do Araripe mountains of northeastern Brazil. These specimens were found by searching in small holes in the ground and under stones, leaf litter, or fallen tree trunks.

The type specimens were found in the municipality of Crato in the southern part of the state of Ceará in Brazil. The species name refers to this type locality. Since the original description of this species, five more specimens, including two males and two females, have been collected and examined. This species has been recorded only in the municipality of Crato and is probably limited to the Chapada do Araripe in Brazil.

This species was the first velvet worm described from the mountainous forests of northeastern Brazil. These forests represents islands of the Atlantic Forest biome isolated within the arid and hot Caatinga domain. These fragmented humid enclaves are vestiges from the interglacial periods of the Pleistocene epoch, when the Atlantic Forest advanced into the Caatinga before retreating to its original distribution.

== Phylogeny ==
A phylogenetic analysis based on molecular data and morphology places Epiperipatus cratensis in a clade with three closely related species of Epiperipatus: E. titanicus, E. lucerna, and E. hyperbolicus. Within this clade, these three species appear in a sister group, emerging as the closest relatives of E. cratensis among all the described species of Epiperipatus in this analysis. Like E. cratensis, these three species are all found in the humid highland forests of northeastern Brazil.

== Description ==
This species ranges from 27 mm to 34 mm in length and from 4.7 mm to 5.2 mm in width. The head, antennae, and dorsal surface of the body are brown with a darker grayish-reddish brown furrow down the middle of the back. The ventral surface is brownish orange. The dorsal surface of each segment features 12 transverse folds (plicae) separated by deep furrows. The basal piece of the primary papillae is shaped like a round dome and features five to eight scale ranks. The apical piece has a spherical shape with an asymmetric distribution of scales: two or three ranks in the back, but three to six in the front.

Males of this species have 30 to 33 pairs of legs; females have 33 or 34 pairs. In males of this species, two or three pairs of the pregenital legs feature crural papillae (tubercles), with one or two papillae per leg. The soles of the feet feature four spinous pads, except for the last pair of legs, which feature only two spinous pads. The feet have three papillae, two anterior and one posterior.

This species exhibits traits considered diagnostic for the genus Epiperipatus. These traits include the number of pregenital legs with crural papillae in males and the number of scale ranks at the base of the primary papillae. Furthermore, like other species in this genus, this species features nephridial tubercles and four complete spinous pads on the fourth and fifth leg pairs, with each tubercle located between the third and fourth spinous pads on the soles of the feet.

This species shares a more extensive set of traits with its close relatives, E. titaniccus, E. lucerna, and E. hyperbolicus. For example, all four species one accessory tooth in addition to the main tooth on the inner jaw. Furthermore, the males in all four species feature anal glands with inconspicuous openings.

The species E. cratensis can be distinguished from these close relatives, however, based on other traits. For example, all plicae are complete in E. cratensis, whereas some plicae are incomplete in the other three species. Furthermore, the apical piece of the primary papillae in E. cratensis is spherical with an asymmetric distribution of scales. In E. titanicus, this piece is conical and symmetric. In E. lucerna, this piece is asymmetric but is also conical. In E. hyperbolicus, this piece is spherical and asymmetric but is also more robust than in E. cratensis. Moreover, E. hyperbolicus features fewer legs (23 to 25 pairs), E. lucerna can feature fewer (27 to 31 pairs), and E. titanicus features more (36 to 39 pairs) than those recorded in E. cratensis (30 to 34 pairs).
