= Mongeperipatus solorzanoi =

Scientific classification
- Kingdom: Animalia
- Phylum: Onychophora
- Family: Peripatidae
- Genus: Mongeperipatus
- Species: M. solorzanoi

Binomial name
- Mongeperipatus solorzanoi (Morera-Brenes & Monge-Nájera, 2010)

Synonyms
- Peripatus solorzanoi Morera-Brenes & Monge-Nájera, 2010; Epiperipatus solorzanoi Costa, Giribet & Pinto-Da-Rocha, 2021

Species of Peripatid velvet worm and largest known Onychophoran

Mongeperipatus solorzanoi, also known as Solórzano's velvet worm, is a species of velvet worm in the family Peripatidae. This species is the largest known velvet worm, reaching 22 cm (8.7 in.) in length. This velvet worm is found in the Caribbean coastal forest of Costa Rica.

== Discovery ==
This species was first described in 2010 by the biologists Bernal Morera-Brenes and Julián Monge-Nájera based on fourteen female specimens and two male specimens. These specimens include a female holotype found by the Costa Rican herpetologist Alejandro Solórzano in Guayacán de Siquirres in Costa Rica in 1996, four young paratypes born to the holotype soon after her capture, and other paratypes collected in 2000. The specific name solorzanoi is in honor of Solórzano, who discovered the species. The holotype is deposited in the Museo de Zoología de la Universidad de Costa Rica in San José, Costa Rica.

== Taxonomy ==
Morera-Brenes and Monge-Nájera first described this species in 2010 under the name Peripatus solorzanoi. In 2020, however, Morera-Brenes and two other biologists at the Universidad Nacional de Costa Rica (José Pablo Barquero-González and Steven Sánchez-Vargas) created a new genus, Mongeperipatus, to contain the newly discovered type species, M. kekoldi, as well as M. solorzanoi. A phylogenetic analysis using DNA sequences placed these two species in their own clade. Furthermore, these two species share morphological characters that indicate that these species do not belong in the other genera and instead belong together in a separate genus. The genus Mongeperipatus is named in honor of Monge-Nájera.

In 2021, the zoologists Cristiano S. Costa, Gonzalo Giribet, and Ricardo Pinto-Da-Rocha suggested moving the species Peripatus solorzanoi to the genus Epiperipatus instead, because a phylogenetic analysis using molecular evidence finds this species nested within the genus Epiperipatus. These zoologists propose a revision of the genus Epiperipatus to avoid paraphyly. Other authorities consider this revision premature, however, and continue to treat Mongeperipatus solorzanoi as the valid name for this species.

== Description ==
When alive, the holotype measured a striking 22 cm in length, including the antennae. This species is notable not only for its giant size but also for a marked sexual dimorphism in leg number: The original description of this species reports that while both male specimens feature only 34 pairs of legs, the females range from 39 to 41 leg pairs, with 41 pairs in most females (eleven in a sample of fourteen specimens). The body of this velvet worm can be light brown or wine red. Whereas the holotype was light brown, for example, her newborns were red. The legs are pale yellow in contrast to the darker body.

This species shares several distinctive features with its close relative M. kekoldi. These features include giant size (M. kekoldi can reach 18 cm in length) and marked sexual dimorphism in leg number (males of the species M. kekoldi have 32 or 33 leg pairs, whereas females have from 37 to 39). Furthermore, the dorsal surface of both species features large conical primary papillae, each with a central sensory bristle that is shaped like a thorn, either slightly curved or straight, with an ornamented base. Several features, however, distinguish M. solorzanoi from M. kekoldi. For example, M. solorzanoi features only four spinous pads (also known as "creeping pads") on the soles of all of its feet, whereas M. kekoldi features a vestigial fifth spinous pad on most of its legs.

== Habitat and behavior ==
This species can be found in forests near streams, where they actively forage for prey after dark. At night, these velvet worms can be seen foraging on the forest floor or on mossy rocks. They touch their prey with their antennae first, then expel two oscillating streams of liquid that weave an adhesive net to trap the prey. These velvet worms move away from the beam of a flashlight, and when touched or bothered, they expel unusually large amounts of adhesive liquid as a defense mechanism.

== Distribution ==
This species is rare and limited to a small area near its type locality in Limón province in Costa Rica. This velvet worm has been observed in Barbilla National Park, the Pacuare River Forest Reserve, and the Guayacán Rainforest Reserve.
