= Eoperipatus horsti =

Scientific classification
- Kingdom: Animalia
- Phylum: Onychophora
- Family: Peripatidae
- Genus: Eoperipatus
- Species: E. horsti

Binomial name
- Eoperipatus horsti Evans, 1901

Species of basal Peripatid velvet worm

Eoperipatus horsti is a species of velvet worm in the Peripatidae family. Authorities have designated this velvet worm as the type species for the genus Eoperipatus, because among the species originally included in this genus, this species is the only one known from descriptions of both sexes. This species is found in Malaysia.

== Discovery and distribution ==
This species was first described in 1901 by Richard Evans of Jesus College at the University of Oxford. He based the original description of this species on eleven specimens (six males and five females). These specimens were found in 1899 in dry rotten wood inside dead trees in the state of Kelantan in West Malaysia. This species is named in honor of the zoologist Rutger Horst.

In 1926, the English zoologist C. Boden Kloss reported finding another specimen of this species crawling on an open road in bright sunshine in the middle of the day. He found this specimen at sea level, 16 miles west of Johore Bahru, at the southern end of the Malay Peninsula. The zoologist William J. Dakin identified his velvet worm as a specimen of E. horsti.

== Description ==
Evans reports that the average length of his male specimens was 33.5 mm, with a maximum length of 40 mm, and the average length of his female specimens was 35.4 mm, with a maximum length of 46 mm. The average length of all eleven of his specimens was 34 mm. Kloss reports finding a much larger specimen, measuring 62.5 mm in length.

The dorsal surface of this species is brown with pale spots. A dark brown line runs down the middle of the back. The ventral surface ranges from pink to a yellowish grey. A row of whitish areas appear along the midline of the ventral surface. The basal piece of the primary papillae on the dorsal surface varies in shape between a cone and a cylinder, while the apical piece may be conical, cylindrical, or spherical.

Females of this species have 24 or 25 pairs of legs; males have 23 or 24 leg pairs, usually 23 pairs. The sole of each foot features four pads, except for the feet on last two pairs of legs. The penultimate pair has only three pads on each foot, and the last pair has only two pads on each foot. On the fourth and fifth leg pairs, the nephridial tubercles appears at the proximal margin of the fourth pad. Each foot features two papillae, one on the anterior margin and the other on the posterior margin.

The genital opening is located between the penultimate pair of legs. In the female, this opening is a transverse slit, but in the male, this opening takes the form of a cross aligned with the transverse and longitudinal axes of the body. In the male of this species, the two leg pairs in front of the genital opening feature crural glands, with two openings for these glands in a groove on each leg. The male also features an opening for the anal glands between the last pair of legs.

This species shares many traits with the other species of Eoperipatus. These characteristics include two papillae on the distal margin of each foot (one in front and one in back), a cruciform genital opening in the male, and a transverse slit for the female genital opening. Other features considered characteristic of this genus include males with a single opening for the anal glands in front of the anus and crural tubercles linked by a dermal fold on each leg of the two pregenital leg pairs.

Other traits distinguish E. horsti from the other described species of Eoperipatus: E. butleri, E. totoro, and E. weldoni, which are considered valid species, and E. sumatranus, which is considered a nomen dubium. For example, E. horsti differs from these other species in the location of the nephridial tubercles on the feet of the fourth and fifth leg pairs. In E. horsti, this tubercle is located at the proximal border of the fourth pad rather than in the middle of the fourth pad (as in E. butleri, E. sumatranus, and E. weldoni) or between the third and fourth pads, indenting the third pad (as in E. totoro).
