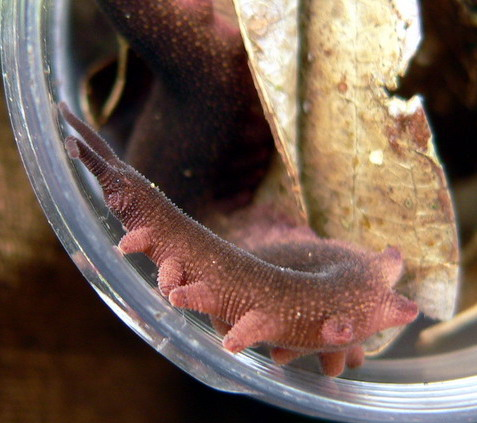
- First known specimen of Eoperipatus totoro (in Vietnam)

Scientific classification
- Kingdom: Animalia
- Phylum: Onychophora
- Family: Peripatidae
- Genus: Eoperipatus
- Species: E. totoro

Binomial name
- Eoperipatus totoro Oliveira et al., 2013

= Eoperipatus totoro =

Species of basal Peripatid velvet worm

Eoperipatus totoro is a species of velvet worm of the family Peripatidae. The species name was inspired by the Catbus from the Studio Ghibli film My Neighbor Totoro. This species is the first velvet worm from Vietnam to be formally described.

== Discovery ==
Pavel V. Kvartalnov from the Lomonosov Moscow State University found the first specimen of E. totoro while looking under stones in the Crocodile Lakes area of Cát Tiên National Park in Vietnam with Eduard A. Galoyan and Igor V. Palko from the Vietnam-Russia Tropical Centre in November 2007. Vietnamese researchers Thai Dran Bai and Nguyen Duc Anh first described this species in 2010, but a team with the Brazilian zoologist Ivo de Sena Oliveira from the University of Leipzig as the lead author published the first formal species description in 2013, including data from scanning electron microscopy and molecular analysis (mitochondrial COI and 12S rRNA sequences). This team described this species based on two male specimens, including a holotype collected by the German zoologist Peter Geissler of the Alexander Koenig Research Museum in 2009, and five females, including two paratypes collected by Kvartalnov in 2008. Although this species remains the only velvet worm described from Vietnam, a report of another velvet worm found in another part of Vietnam indicates that at least one other species in that country remains undescribed.

== Etymology ==
The specific name totoro was suggested by Kvartalnov, Galoyan, and Palko, after the titular character in the Japanese animated film My Neighbor Totoro. In this film, Totoro uses a vehicle (the Catbus) that resembles a velvet worm. Kvartanov and his colleagues watched this film on the evening of their discovery of the first specimen, which reminded them of the Catbus.

== Habitat and behavior ==
These velvet worms have permeable skin that readily dries out, so they spend most of their lives inside moist soil, in rotting logs, or under rocks. This species is found mainly during the rainy season, which runs from November to June in Vietnam. Like other velvet worms, E. totoro can spit out jets of sticky adhesive fluid from two dorsal appendages to capture small prey; this "glue" is a mixture of proteins in which the prey becomes entangled.

== Description ==
This species can reach 65 mm (2.6 in.) in length. This dorsal surface of this species is dark brown with a darker midline. The ventral surface is brownish pink, with an alternating pattern of bright spots along the midline. Females have 24 pairs of legs; males have 23 pairs of legs. The ventral surface of the legs are pink, and the first and last leg pairs are reduced in size. The inner and outer jaw blades each feature a main tooth and two accessory teeth, and the inner blade also features 11 to 13 denticles.

The dorsal primary papillae each feature an apical piece and a basal piece separated by a constriction. The basal piece is cylindrical with an asymmetric distribution of scales (seven scale ranks on the lateral sides, but eight or nine ranks elsewhere). The apical piece is spherical with an asymmetric distribution of scales (five to seven anterior scale ranks but only one or two posterior ranks). The sensory bristle is thorn-shaped and located toward the posterior side of the apical piece.

On most legs, the feet feature four spinous pads and a fragmented fifth pad. The first two and the last three leg pairs lack the fifth pad, and the last leg pair lacks the fourth pad as well. The nephridial tubercle on the fourth and fifth leg pairs appears between the third and fourth pads and indents the third pad. Each foot features two distal papillae, one anterior and one posterior.

The genital opening is located between the penultimate pair of legs. In the female, this opening is a transverse slit, but in the male, this opening is cruciform with four circular pits on the genital pad. The male features a single opening for the anal gland on a large pad between the last pair of legs as well as crural complexes on the two pregenital leg pairs.

This species shares many traits with other species of Eoperipatus. These characteristics include two distal papillae on each foot (one anterior and one posterior), a cruciform genital opening in the male, and a transverse slit for the female genital opening. Furthermore, like other species in this genus, E. totoro features a single opening for the anal gland in front of the anus and crural tubercles forming a single complex on each leg of the two pregenital leg pairs.

Other traits distinguish E. totoro from the other described species of Eoperipatus: E. butleri, E. horsti, and E. weldoni, which are considered valid species, and E. sumatranus, which is considered a nomen dubium. For example, E. totoro differs from these other species in the shape of the apical piece on its dorsal primary papillae. This piece is spherical in E. totoro rather than conical (as in E. butleri), cylindrical (as in E. sumatranus), or variable in shape (as in E. horsti or E. weldoni). Furthermore, in E. totoro, the nephridial tubercle in the fourth and fifth leg pairs is located between the third and fourth spinous pads rather than in the middle of the fourth pad (as in E. butleri, E. sumatranus, and E. weldoni) or at the proximal border of the fourth pad (as in E. horsti). Other diagnostic features of E. totoro include distinct types of scales on the ventral side of the body, the inner structure of the circular pits on the male genital pad, and the position and size of the anal gland pads in males.
