= Epiperipatus hilkae =

Scientific classification
- Kingdom: Animalia
- Phylum: Onychophora
- Family: Peripatidae
- Genus: Epiperipatus
- Species: E. hilkae

Binomial name
- Epiperipatus hilkae Morera-Brenes & Monge-Nájera, 1990

Species of velvet worm

Epiperipatus hilkae is a species of velvet worm in the Peripatidae family. This species is found in Costa Rica. This velvet worm is closely related to another species of Epiperipatus found in Costa Rica, E. isthmicola. The species E. hilkae is named in honor of the German zoologist Hilke Ruhberg for her extensive work on velvet worms.

== Discovery ==
This species was first described in 1990 by the biologists Bernal Morera-Brenes and Julián Monge-Nájera. They based the original description of this species on a female holotype and eight other specimens (five males and three females). Morera-Brenes collected the holotype in Barra Honda National Park in 1985, in the canton of Nicoya in the province of Guanacaste in Costa Rica. After capture, the holotype gave birth to four paratypes (one female and three males, including the male allotype). The holotype and four paratypes are deposited in the zoology museum of the University of Costa Rica in San José, Costa Rica. The other specimens (two males and two females) were collected in the Curú Wildlife Refuge on the Nicoya Peninsula in Costa Rica. Because the original description of this species is based on specimens from two locations 62 km apart from one another, authorities suspect a species complex.

== Description ==
The female holotype measured 56 mm in length; the newborn paratypes ranged from 1.2 mm to 1.8 mm in length. Males of this species have 25 to 27 pairs of legs; females have 28 to 29 pairs. The dorsal surface of the body is dark brown with a series of light reddish brown hexagons along the middle of the back. The ventral surface is pink until the sixth leg pair, where it becomes dark brown. Brown lines down the middle of both the back and the ventral surface are darker than the rest of the body.

The external jaw blade features two accessory teeth in addition to the main tooth. The presence of two accessory teeth here distinguishes this species from others in the genus Epiperipatus in Central America. The internal jaw blade features one accessory tooth and twelve denticles in addition to the main tooth.

The soles of the feet feature four pads, except for the last two pairs of legs, which are rudimentary. The first three pads on the feet are well-developed, but the fourth pad is rudimentary. The fourth and fifth leg pairs feature nephridial tubercles that are free from the third pad and only partly surrounded by the rudimentary fourth pad. Each leg features three-foot papillae, two anterior and one posterior. In males of this species, the two pregenital leg pairs feature crural tubercles, with two tubercles at the base of each leg.

The dorsal surface of each body segment features twelve skin folds, with seven that reach the ventral side and five that are incomplete. These folds are divided only by the channel running down the middle of the back. The primary papillae are conical with rounded bases. The apical piece of these papillae is symmetric, with two or three scale ranks, and the basal piece features four or five scale ranks.

This species exhibits traits considered diagnostic for the genus Epiperipatus. These traits include the number of pregenital legs with crural papillae in males and the number of scale ranks at the base of the primary papillae. Furthermore, like other species in this genus, this species features nephridial tubercles on the fourth and fifth leg pairs, with each tubercle located between the third and fourth pads on the soles of the feet.

This species shares a more extensive set of traits with its close relative E. isthmicola. For example, these two species exhibit similar coloration and the same general shape of both jaw blades. Furthermore, both species feature only four pads on their feet, with a rudimentary fourth pad that is reduced in size, and a nephridial tubercle detached from the third pad. Moreover, both species feature some dorsal folds (plicae) that are incomplete.

These two close relatives can be distinguished, however, based on other traits. For example, E. hilkae features two accessory teeth on the outer jaw blade, whereas E. isthmicola features only one accessory tooth. Furthermore, E. hilkae features only four or five scale ranks on the basal piece of the primary papillae, whereas E. isthmicola features about fourteen scale ranks.
