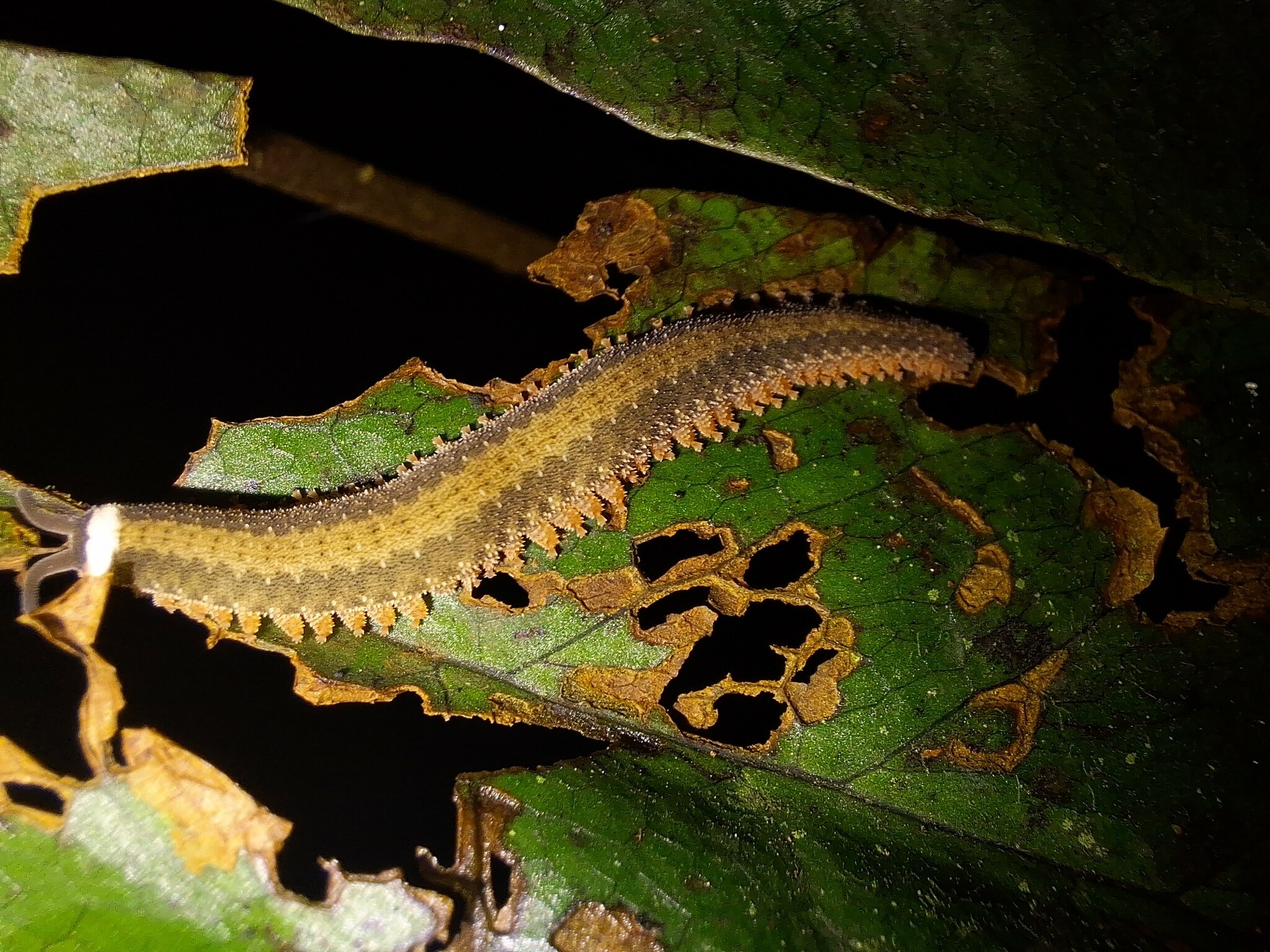
- Oroperipatus

Scientific classification
- Kingdom: Animalia
- Phylum: Onychophora
- Family: Peripatidae
- Genus: Oroperipatus
- Species: O. tiputini

Binomial name
- Oroperipatus tiputini Montalvo-Salazar, Bejarano, Valarezo & Cisneros-Heredia, 2024

= Oroperipatus tiputini =

Species of peripatid velvet worm

Oroperipatus tiputini is a species of velvet worm in the Peripatidae family.

== Taxonomy and phylogeny ==
The research on the species spanned several decades. Diego F. Cisneros-Heredia, one of the authors and director of the Museum of Zoology at Universidad San Francisco de Quito (USFQ), Ecuador, first discovered the species in 2001. The formal description was completed as part of Jorge Montalvo's graduation thesis.

The specific epithet tiputini is derived from the type locality, Tiputini Biodiversity Station (TBS). This name is used in apposition to honor the significant efforts of TBS's management, research, and field teams in safeguarding Amazonian biodiversity.

The description of Oroperipatus tiputini increased the total number of velvet worm species documented from mainland Ecuador to seven. It was the first species described from the Amazonian lowlands of Ecuador and the third from western Amazonia. Most velvet worm species from Ecuador are known exclusively from their type localities, and in some cases, their taxonomy remains unclear and requires further revision.

Morphologically, Oroperipatus tiputini shows closer affinities to Oroperipatus lankesteri than to Oroperipatus weyrauchi or Oroperipatus bluntschlii, despite the latter two being the only congeners found in the Amazon basin. This morphological resemblance to Oroperipatus lankesteri could suggest a potential evolutionary relationship; however, without additional phylogenetic data, it is premature to propose any definitive hypotheses. Oroperipatus lankesteri is known only from its type locality in Paramba, located in the northern Pacific lowlands of Ecuador.

== Description ==
Oroperipatus tiputini can be distinguished by its unique combination of features. Its head is marked by 40 to 52 antennal rings, with the tip of the antenna exhibiting 14 rings of alternating sensory structures. A notable chitinous extension is present beneath the eye, and the frontal organ is approximately the size of four to five anterior dermal papillae.

The dorsal integument of Oroperipatus tiputini features 12 plicae per segment, alternating between large and narrow. Primary papillae are ovoid, with the largest found on the major plicae and smaller papillae distributed across the minor plicae. These primary papillae are often accompanied by one to three accessory papillae, adding to the species' distinctive appearance. On the ventral side, the preventral organs are not prominent. The legs of the species display 17 to 18 transverse rings. In legs IV and V, there are four spinous pads, with the fifth being notably reduced. Males are particularly distinguished by their crural tubercles, which are arranged in a specific pattern across their pregenital legs.

This species exhibits sexual dimorphism in both size and leg number: Females of this species range from 46 mm to 65 mm in length, whereas males range from 23 mm to 40 mm in length. Females have 37 to 40 pairs of legs, whereas males have 34 to 37 leg pairs.

In terms of coloration, Oroperipatus tiputini exhibits considerable variation among individuals. Adults may appear in hues ranging from plain dark orange to brown with varied patterns. A conspicuous white band with a heart-shaped border runs along the midline of all specimens, providing a distinctive visual marker. The species exhibits notable ontogenic color changes. The adult female holotype displays a uniform dark orange dorsal coloration, in contrast to the yellowish background and rhomboid pattern observed in the juvenile. Juveniles are characterized by their brighter colors, with a lighter yellow hue and distinct rhomboid patterns. As they mature, their coloration darkens, and the rhomboid pattern diminishes or disappears. In males, the pattern fades, while in females, it is often completely lost.

== Habitat and distribution ==
Oroperipatus tiputini is currently known exclusively from its type locality at the Tiputini Biodiversity Station in the northern Amazonian lowlands of Ecuador. Most specimens have been discovered in old-growth, closed-canopy Terra Firme forests, where they inhabit various microhabitats such as the leaves and stems of small forbs less than 70 cm above the ground, leaf litter, and buttress roots. One specimen was notably found inside a bromeliad.

== Ecology ==
The species is predominantly nocturnal, with most individuals observed between 19:00 and 23:00. However, an exception was noted with a male individual active on a tree trunk 1.5 meters above the ground in old-growth Várzea forest at 16:00. Typically, individuals are found either singly or in pairs. In a captive setting, the female holotype gave birth to a single juvenile, which remained in close contact with the mother for three days before being euthanized. During this period, the juvenile was often found on the mother's back or in close proximity.
