= Epiperipatus vespuccii =

Scientific classification
- Kingdom: Animalia
- Phylum: Onychophora
- Family: Peripatidae
- Genus: Epiperipatus
- Species: E. vespuccii

Binomial name
- Epiperipatus vespuccii Brues, 1914

Synonyms
- Peripatus (Epiperipatus) vespuccii (Brues, 1914)

Species of velvet worm

Epiperipatus vespuccii is a species of velvet worm in the family Peripatidae. The male of this species features 30 pairs of legs, whereas females can feature either 33 or 34 leg pairs. This velvet worm is found in Colombia.

== Discovery, distribution, and habitat ==
This species was first described in 1914 by the American biologist Charles T. Brues. He based the original description of this species on three specimens (two females and one male). These specimens were collected in 1913 by the American zoologists Alexander G. Ruthven and Arthur S. Pearse during an expedition to the Sierra Nevada de Santa Marta in northeastern Colombia. They found all three specimens near Santa Marta in Colombia. The species is named in honor of the Italian explorer Amerigo Vespucci.

The female holotype was found under the bark of a live tree in a dry dense forest near a coffee plantation at an elevation of 2,300 feet. The male paratype was found under leaves in a forest at an elevation of 2,200 feet near the same plantation. The female holotype and the male paratype are deposited at the Museum of Comparative Zoology at Harvard University. Another female specimen collected by the American biologist Ralph V. Chamberlin from Santa Marta is also deposited in the Museum of Comparative Zoology. This species is known only from the vicinity of Santa Marta in the department of Magdalena in Colombia.

== Taxonomy ==
Brues originally described this species in 1914 under the name Peritpatus (Epiperipatus) vespuccii. Since then, other authors have used the name Epiperipatus vespuccii instead, treating Epiperipatus as a valid genus rather than a subgenus. Accordingly, authorities now accept Epiperipatus vespuccii as the valid name for this species.

== Description ==
This species ranges from 20 mm to 50 mm in length and from 2 mm to 5 mm in width. The male of this species features 30 leg pairs, whereas the female can feature either 33 or 34 pairs, with 34 pairs in two of the three female specimens described. Each jaw features two blades, one inner blade and one outer blade. Each blade features one principal tooth and one accessory tooth, and the outer blade also features nine denticles. Each antenna features 44 to 46 rings.

The body of this velvet worm is slender. The dorsal surface is darker than the sides of the body and features a complex pattern, with a lighter broad stripe that is continuous but constricted between each body segment to form a series of diamonds down the middle of the back. A narrow dark line runs down the middle of this stripe but is interrupted where the lighter broader stripe is constricted. The legs are distinctly paler than the sides of the body, and the antennae are also pale. These patterns fade, however, when specimens are preserved in alcohol.

An evident furrow runs down the middle of the back (dorsomedian furrow). Each segment features twelve transverse ridges (plicae) of uniform width, with seven plicae extending from the dorsomedian furrow to the ventral side. Two plicae above each leg are incomplete, extending nearly half of the way from the dorsomedian furrow to the top of the leg. Three sizes of primary papillae (each with a sensory bristle) are distributed randomly among the plicae. The base of the dorsal papillae is no wider than the plicae. The base and the apical piece of the largest primary papillae are similar in size, with the base larger than the apical piece. The bristle emerges from the posterior part of the apical piece. The accessory papillae (each with no bristle) are smaller but more numerous than the primary papillae on the plicae, where the accessory papillae are present both on the ridges and in the furrows. The primary papillae can be either close together or separated by one to four accessory papillae.

Each leg features three foot papillae, two anterior and one posterior, and four spinous pads. The fourth and fifth leg pair feature not only four complete spinous pads but also a vestigial fifth spinous pad. These legs also feature a nephridial tubercle between the third and fourth pads, sitting in an indentation on the margin of the third pad. The male features not only crural papillae on two pregenital leg pairs, with one crural papilla on each leg, but also inconspicuous anal glands, with two pores in front of the anus.

This velvet worm exhibits traits that characterize the genus Epiperipatus. For example, like other species in this genus, this species features nephridial tubercles betweern the third and fourth spinous pads on the fourth and fifth leg pairs. Furthermore, like most species in this genus, this species features four complete spinous pads on the feet.

This species shares a more extensive set of traits with another species in the same genus, E. edwardsii. For example, both species feature twelve plicae per segment, with seven extending to the ventral side and two incomplete, and males with inconspicuous anal glands. Furthermore, these two species feature similar jaws, with one accessory tooth as well as the main tooth on each blade. Moreover, these two species feature similar numbers of antennal rings and legs, with each species including specimens with 44 to 46 rings on the antennae, males with 30 leg pairs, and females with 33 or 34 leg pairs. These two species can be distinguished, however, based on other traits. For example, the fourth and fifth leg pairs feature a vestigial fifth spinous pad in E. vespuccii but not in E. edwardsii.
