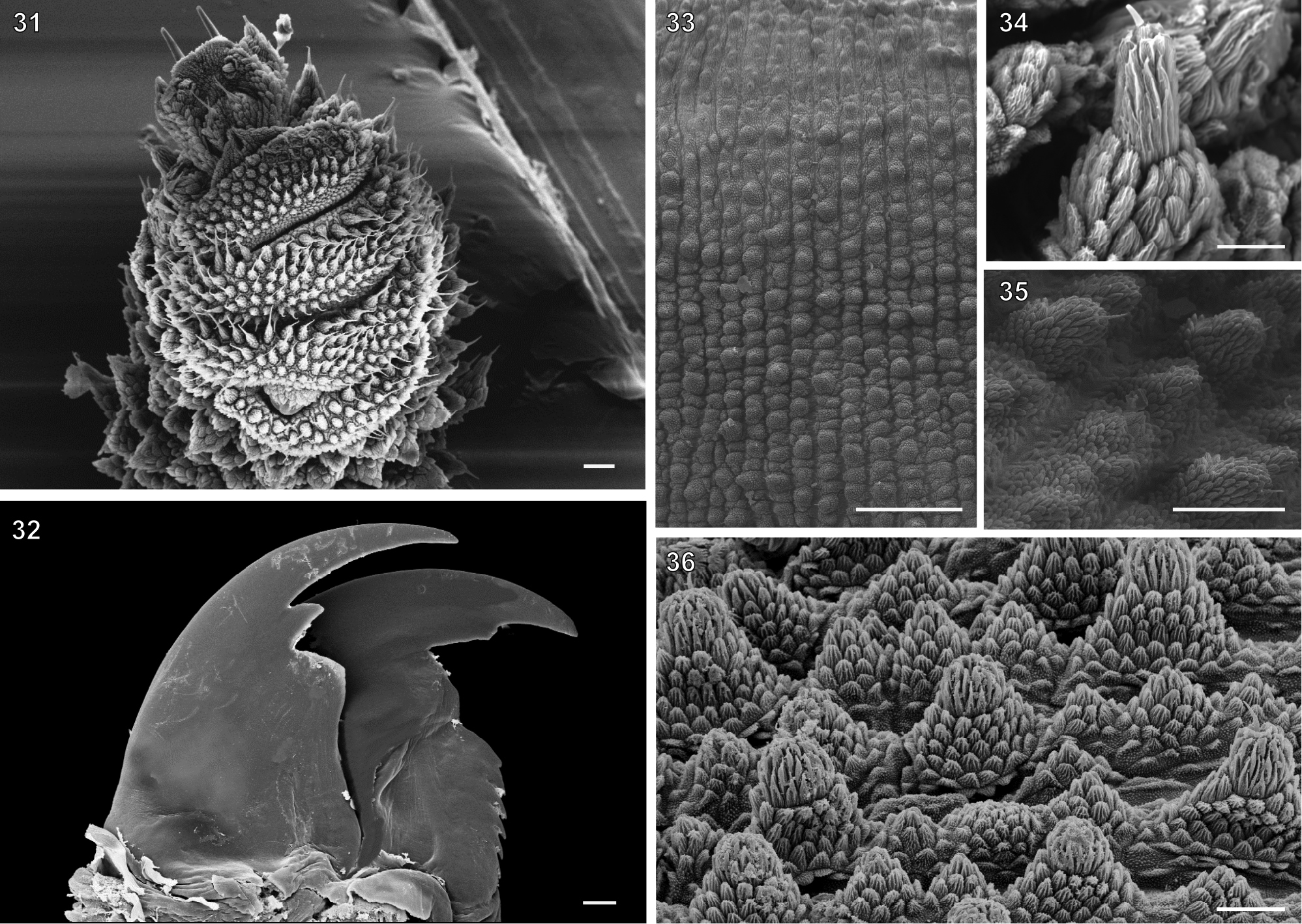

Scientific classification
- Kingdom: Animalia
- Phylum: Onychophora
- Family: Peripatidae
- Genus: Epiperipatus
- Species: E. brasiliensis

Binomial name
- Epiperipatus brasiliensis (Bouvier, 1899)

Synonyms
- Peripatus santarem Sedgwick, 1888 — nomen oblitum; Peripatus brasiliensis Bouvier, 1899; Epiperipatus brasiliensis brasiliensis — Peck, 1975

= Epiperipatus brasiliensis =

Species of velvet worm

Epiperipatus brasiliensis is a species of velvet worm in the Peripatidae family. Males of this species have 29 pairs of legs; females have 31 or 33. This species ranges from 22 mm to 80 mm in length. The type locality is in Pará, Brazil. Epiperipatus vagans from Barro Colorado Island (Panama) was originally described as subspecies of Epiperipatus brasiliensis, but is now treated as a full species.
