= Oroperipatus lankesteri =

Scientific classification
- Kingdom: Animalia
- Phylum: Onychophora
- Family: Peripatidae
- Genus: Oroperipatus
- Species: O. lankesteri

Binomial name
- Oroperipatus lankesteri (Bouvier, 1899)

Synonyms
- Peripatus lankesteri Bouvier, 1899

Species of Peripatid velvet worm

Oroperipatus lankesteri is a species of velvet worm in the Peripatidae family. This velvet worm is notable for its large size, reaching 82 mm in length. This species is known only from its type locality in the northern Pacific lowlands of Ecuador.

== Discovery ==
This species was first described by the French entomologist Eugène Louis Bouvier in 1899 based on a single specimen found near Quito in Ecuador and deposited in the Natural History Museum of London. Bouvier named this species for the British zoologist Ray Lankester, who provided access to this specimen. The label on the type specimen provides a more precise type locality, indicating Imbabura, on the River Parambas, 16 km (10 miles) north of Quito.

== Taxonomy ==
Bouvier originally described this species under the name Peripatus lankesteri. The American entomologist Theodore D.A. Cockerell introduced the name Oroperipatus in 1908 as a subgenus in the genus Peripatus and designated O. lankesteri as the type species of the new subgenus. The American zoologist Austin Hobart Clark elevated Oroperipatus to a genus in 1913.

== Description ==
After obtaining more specimens, Bouvier described this species in greater detail in 1905. Bouvier based this more extended description on four adult females and several embryos extracted from two of those females, with the embryonic specimens including three males and two females. This description reports that the females of this species have 37 or 38 pairs of legs, with the female specimens dividing equally between these two numbers. The males have 33, 34, or 35 leg pairs, with one male specimen featuring each number. This description also reports that the adult females range from 35 mm to 82 mm in length, and a male embryo that is almost fully developed measures 32 mm in length. Bouvier describes the dorsal surface of this species as a brownish grey.

This species shares many distinctive features with Oroperipatus tiputini, another species in the same genus, also found in Ecuador. These features include two to three accessory teeth on the outer jaw and seven rings on the tip of the antennae. In both species, the fifth spinous pad on the soles of the feet on the fourth and fifth leg pairs is reduced in size compared to the other spinous pads. Both species also feature two variations of primary papillae (dermal papillae, each with a sensory bristle) on the dorsal surface. The species O. tiputini also has a similar size range (with females ranging from 46 mm to 65 mm in length and males ranging from 23 mm to 40 mm in length) and a similar number of legs (females with 37 to 40 pairs and males with 34 to 37 pairs).

Several other features, however, distinguish O. lankesteri from O. tiputini. For example, O. lankesteri features five to seven foot papillae, whereas O. tiputini features only four foot papillae (two anterior papillae and two posterior papillae). Furthermore, in O. lankesteri, the frontal organs (fields with sensory bristles) on the ventral surface at the base of the antennae are as large as five to six papillae, whereas in O. tiputini, these organs are smaller, only as large as four to five papillae.

The species O. lankesteri also shares features with Oroperipatus ecuadorensis, another similar species in the same genus, also found in Ecuador. For example, the frontal organ in O. ecuadorensis is also as large as five to six papillae, and O. ecuadorensis has a similar number of foot papillae (five to six). Furthermore, O. lankesteri is similar to O. ecuadorensis in terms of size and the number of legs: The female of the species O. ecuadorensis reaches 67 mm in length and has 39 pairs of legs.

The species O. lankesteri may be distinguished from O. ecuadorensis, however, based on the fifth spinous pad on the fourth and fifth leg pairs. Whereas this pad is reduced in size in O. lankesteri, this pad just as wide as the other spinous pads in O. ecuadorensis. Furthermore, O. lankesteri features two variations of primary papillae, whereas O. ecuadorensis features three variations.
