= Epiperipatus marajoara =

Scientific classification
- Kingdom: Animalia
- Phylum: Onychophora
- Family: Peripatidae
- Genus: Epiperipatus
- Species: E. marajoara

Binomial name
- Epiperipatus marajoara Costa, Chagas & Pinto-da-Rocha, 2018

Species of velvet worm

Epiperipatus marajoara is a species of velvet worm in the family Peripatidae. The males of this species have 27 pairs of legs; females have 31 pairs. The type locality is in Pará state in Brazil.
