= Oroperipatus koepckei =

Scientific classification
- Kingdom: Animalia
- Phylum: Onychophora
- Family: Peripatidae
- Genus: Oroperipatus
- Species: O. koepckei

Binomial name
- Oroperipatus koepckei Zilch, 1954

Species of Peripatid velvet worm

Oroperipatus koepckei is a species of velvet worm in the Peripatidae family. The original description of this species is based on a single female specimen measuring 40 mm in length. The female of this species has 32 pairs of legs. The type locality is in Peru.
