= Heteroperipatus engelhardi =

Scientific classification
- Kingdom: Animalia
- Phylum: Onychophora
- Family: Peripatidae
- Genus: Heteroperipatus
- Species: H. engelhardi

Binomial name
- Heteroperipatus engelhardi Zilch, 1954

Species of Peripatid velvet worm

Heteroperipatus engelhardi is a species of velvet worm in the Peripatidae family. Males of this species have 27 or 28 pairs of legs; females have 31 or 32 leg pairs. Females range from 24.5 mm to 52 mm in length; males range from 12 mm to 25 mm in length. The type locality is in El Salvador.
