= Macroperipatus guianensis =

Scientific classification
- Kingdom: Animalia
- Phylum: Onychophora
- Family: Peripatidae
- Genus: Macroperipatus
- Species: M. guianensis

Binomial name
- Macroperipatus guianensis (Evans, 1903)

Synonyms
- Peripatus guianensis (Evans, 1903); Peripatus ohausi var. guianensis (Bouvier 1904); Peripatus (Macroperipatus) guianensis (Clark 1913)

Species of velvet worm

Macroperipatus guianensis is a species of velvet worm in the Peripatidae family. The male of this species has 24 pairs of legs; females have 27 or 28 leg pairs, usually 28. This species ranges from 30 mm to 80 mm in length. The type locality is in Guyana.
