= Oroperipatus omeyrus =

Scientific classification
- Kingdom: Animalia
- Phylum: Onychophora
- Family: Peripatidae
- Genus: Oroperipatus
- Species: O. omeyrus

Binomial name
- Oroperipatus omeyrus Marcus, 1952

Species of Peripatid velvet worm

Oroperipatus omeyrus is a species of velvet worm in the Peripatidae family. This species is blackish red on its dorsal surface but lighter and brownish on its ventral surface. The original description of this species is based on female specimens with 24 to 26 pairs of legs and an embryo (probably a male) with 22 pairs of legs. The females range from 16 mm to 22 mm in length. The type locality is in Peru.
