= Epiperipatus adenocryptus =

Scientific classification
- Kingdom: Animalia
- Phylum: Onychophora
- Family: Peripatidae
- Genus: Epiperipatus
- Species: E. adenocryptus

Binomial name
- Epiperipatus adenocryptus Oliveira et al. 2011

Synonyms
- Epiperipatus analgos Lacorte et al. 2010

Species of velvet worm

Epiperipatus adenocryptus is a species of velvet worm in the Peripatidae family. This species is brown with a series of light brown arcs on each side forming a series of circles down its dorsal surface. Males of this species have 26 or 27 pairs of legs, usually 27; females have 28 to 30, usually 29. The type locality is in Minas Gerais, Brazil.
