= Epiperipatus broadwayi =

Scientific classification
- Kingdom: Animalia
- Phylum: Onychophora
- Family: Peripatidae
- Genus: Epiperipatus
- Species: E. broadwayi

Binomial name
- Epiperipatus broadwayi (Clark, 1913)

Synonyms
- Peripatus (Epiperipatus) trinidadensis var. broadwayi (Clark 1913); Epiperipatus trinidadensis broadwayi (Peck 1975)

Species of velvet worm

Epiperipatus broadwayi is a species of velvet worm in the Peripatidae family. This species is dark brown with light brown triangles down its back. This species has 29 to 34 pairs of legs. The type locality is in Tobago.
