= Oroperipatus balzani =

Scientific classification
- Kingdom: Animalia
- Phylum: Onychophora
- Family: Peripatidae
- Genus: Oroperipatus
- Species: O. balzani

Binomial name
- Oroperipatus balzani (Camerano, 1897)

Synonyms
- Peripatus balzani (Camerano, 1897)

Species of Peripatid velvet worm

Oroperipatus balzani is a species of velvet worm in the Peripatidae family. Males of this species range from 27 mm to 31 mm in length and have 26 or 27 pairs of legs. The type locality is in Bolivia and Brazil.
