= Oroperipatus intermedius =

Scientific classification
- Kingdom: Animalia
- Phylum: Onychophora
- Family: Peripatidae
- Genus: Oroperipatus
- Species: O. intermedius

Binomial name
- Oroperipatus intermedius (Bouvier, 1901)

Synonyms
- Peripatus intermedius (Bouvier, 1901)

Species of Peripatid velvet worm

Oroperipatus intermedius is a species of velvet worm in the Peripatidae family. The female of this species has 32 pairs of legs. The type locality is in Bolivia.
