= Oroperipatus belli =

Scientific classification
- Kingdom: Animalia
- Phylum: Onychophora
- Family: Peripatidae
- Genus: Oroperipatus
- Species: O. belli

Binomial name
- Oroperipatus belli (Bouvier, 1904)

Synonyms
- Peripatus belli (Bouvier, 1904)

Species Peripatid of velvet worm

Oroperipatus belli is a species of velvet worm in the Peripatidae family. The female of this species has 28 pairs of legs; the male has 25 pairs. The type locality is in Ecuador.
