= Oroperipatus multipodes =

Scientific classification
- Kingdom: Animalia
- Phylum: Onychophora
- Family: Peripatidae
- Genus: Oroperipatus
- Species: O. multipodes

Binomial name
- Oroperipatus multipodes (Fuhrmann, 1913)

Synonyms
- Peripatus multipodes (Fuhrmann, 1913)

Species of Peripatid velvet worm

Oroperipatus multipodes is a species of velvet worm in the Peripatidae family. This species has 33 pairs of legs. The type locality is in Colombia.
