= Epiperipatus ohausi =

Scientific classification
- Kingdom: Animalia
- Phylum: Onychophora
- Family: Peripatidae
- Genus: Epiperipatus
- Species: E. ohausi

Binomial name
- Epiperipatus ohausi (Bouvier, 1900)

Species of velvet worm

Epiperipatus ohausi is a species of velvet worm in the family Peripatidae. Males of this species have 26 to 28 pairs of legs; females have 27 to 29.
