= Epiperipatus acacioi =

Scientific classification
- Kingdom: Animalia
- Phylum: Onychophora
- Family: Peripatidae
- Genus: Epiperipatus
- Species: E. acacioi

Binomial name
- Epiperipatus acacioi (Marcus & Marcus, 1955)

Synonyms
- Peripatus ouropretanus (Trindade 1958); Peripatus acacioi (Marcus & Marcus 1955); Peripatus (Macroperipatus) acacioi (Froehlich 1968); Macroperipatus acacioi (Peck 1975)

Species of velvet worm

Epiperipatus acacioi is a species of velvet worm in the Peripatidae family. This species is dark purple with a bilaterally symmetric pattern on its dorsal surface and ranges from 13 mm to 51 mm in length. Males of this species have 24 to 28 pairs of legs, usually 25 or 26; females have 26 to 30, usually 27 or 28. The type locality is in Minas Gerais, Brazil.
