= Epiperipatus hyperbolicus =

Scientific classification
- Kingdom: Animalia
- Phylum: Onychophora
- Family: Peripatidae
- Genus: Epiperipatus
- Species: E. hyperbolicus

Binomial name
- Epiperipatus hyperbolicus Costa, Chagas & Pinto-da-Rocha, 2018

Species of velvet worm

Epiperipatus hyperbolicus is a species of velvet worm in the family Peripatidae. This velvet worm is known only from its type locality in the state of Alagoas in Brazil. The species name refers to the unusually large apical piece on the primary papillae on this velvet worm. This distinctive apical piece is notable for its size and spherical shape. The males of this species have 23 pairs of legs; females have 24 or 25 pairs.

== Discovery ==
This species was first described in 2018 by the zoologists Christiano Sampaio Costa, Amazonas Chagas-Junior, and Ricardo Pinto-da-Rocha. They based the original description of this species on a male holotype and three female paratypes. These specimens were all found in the Murici Ecological Station in the municipality of Murici in the state of Alagoas in Brazil. The holotype and paratypes were deposited in the Museu Nacional do Rio de Janeiro in Brazil but destroyed in a fire in 2019.

== Phylogeny ==
A phylogenetic analysis based on molecular data and morphology places Epiperipatus hyperbolicus in a clade with two closely related species, Epiperipatus titanicus and Epiperipatus lucerna. This analysis places E. hyperbolicus on the most basal branch of the phylogenetic tree within this clade, with the other two species appearing in a sister group. These two species emerge as the closest relatives of E. hyperbolicus among all the described species of Epiperipatus in this analysis. These three species were discovered in the same rotten log in the Murici Ecological Station and were described together by the same three zoologists in 2018.

== Description ==
The female paratypes ranged from 22 mm to 33 mm in length, and the male holotype measured 26 mm in length. The female paratypes had 24 or 25 pairs of legs, whereas the male holotype had 23 leg pairs. The background color of the body in living specimens is a dark grayish red. The jaw features two blades, an inner blade and an outer blade, each with a long curved main tooth and one accessory tooth. In the male of this species, one or two pairs of the pregenital legs feature crural papillae (tubercles), with one papilla per leg.

The largest primary papillae are pale, and the number of these pale primary papillae increases near the legs. The basal piece of the primary papillae features six or seven scale ranks. The apical piece is robust and spherical, but with an asymmetric distribution of scales: six or seven scale ranks in the front and three in the back. A needle-shaped sensory bristle emerges from the back side of the apical piece.

This species exhibits traits considered diagnostic for the genus Epiperipatus. These traits include the number of pregenital legs with crural papillae in males and the number of scale ranks at the base of the primary papillae. Furthermore, like other species in this genus, this species features nephridial tubercles on the fourth and fifth leg pairs, with each tubercle located between the third and fourth spinous pads on the soles of the feet.

This species shares a more extensive set of traits with its close relatives, E. titaniccus and E. lucerna. For example, all three species exhibits the same dorsal background color and the same arrangement of pale primary papillae. Furthermore, all three species feature one accessory tooth in addition to the main tooth on both the inner and outer jaw blades. Moreover, the males of each species feature pregenital legs with crural papillae, with one crural papilla per leg.

These three species can be distinguished, however, by the apical piece of their primary papillae. In E. hyperbolicus, this piece is large and spherical, with an asymmetric distribution of scales: six or seven scale ranks in the front and three in the back. In E. titanicus, this piece is conical with a symmetric distribution of scales, which are reduced to one rank. In E. lucerna, this piece is also conical, but with an asymmetric distribution of scales: three scale ranks in the front and two in the back. Furthermore, E. hyperbolicus features fewer legs (23 to 25 pairs) than either E. lucerna (27 to 31 pairs) or E. titanicus (36 to 39 pairs).
