= Mongeperipatus =

Scientific classification
- Kingdom: Animalia
- Phylum: Onychophora
- Family: Peripatidae
- Genus: Mongeperipatus; González et al. 2020

Species
- See text

Genus of Peripatid velvet worm

Mongeperipatus is a genus of velvet worms in the family Peripatidae from Costa Rica. The biologists José Pablo Barquero-González, Steven Sánchez-Vargas, and Bernal Morera-Brenes introduced this genus in 2020 to contain the newly discovered type species, M. kekoldi, together with another species, M. solorzanoi. A phylogenetic analysis using DNA sequences placed these two species in their own monophyletic clade. Furthermore, these two species share morphological characters that indicate that these species do not belong in the other genera and instead belong together in a separate genus. The genus Mongeperipatus is named in honor of the Costa Rican biologist Julián Monge-Nájera.

== Description ==
The species in this genus are notable for their giant size, with the largest specimens ranging from 18 to 22 cm (7.1 to 8.7 in) in length. This genus also exhibits a striking degree of sexual dimorphism in the number of legs: females have 37 to 41 pairs, several more than the males, which have only 32 to 34 pairs. The dorsal surface of these velvet worms feature large conical primary papillae, each with a central sensory bristle that is shaped like a thorn, either slightly curved or straight, with an ornamented base. This genus is viviparous, with mothers supplying nourishment to their embryos through a placenta.

== Distribution ==
These velvet worms are found in the Limón, Matina, Siquirres, and Talamanca cantons of Limón province in Costa Rica.

== Species ==
The genus contains the following two species:

- Mongeperipatus solorzanoi (Morera-Brenes & Monge-Nájera, 2010)
- Mongeperipatus kekoldi González et al. 2020
