= Oroperipatus cameranoi =

Scientific classification
- Kingdom: Animalia
- Phylum: Onychophora
- Family: Peripatidae
- Genus: Oroperipatus
- Species: O. cameranoi

Binomial name
- Oroperipatus cameranoi (Bouvier, 1899)

Synonyms
- Peripatus cameranoi (Bouvier, 1899)

Species of Peripatid velvet worm

Oroperipatus cameranoi is a species of velvet worm in the Peripatidae family. This species ranges from 34 mm to 55 mm in length. Females of this species have 34 to 36 pairs of legs; males have 32. The type locality is in Ecuador.
