= Epiperipatus machadoi =

Scientific classification
- Kingdom: Animalia
- Phylum: Onychophora
- Family: Peripatidae
- Genus: Epiperipatus
- Species: E. machadoi

Binomial name
- Epiperipatus machadoi (Oliveira & Wieloch, 2005)

Synonyms
- Macroperipatus machadoi (Oliveira & Wieloch, 2005)

Species of velvet worm

Epiperipatus machadoi is a species of velvet worm in the Peripatidae family. This species is dark brown with a series of light brown arcs on each side forming circles down its back and ranges from 20 mm to 66 mm in length. Males of this species have 27 to 29 pairs of legs, usually 28; females have 28 to 31, usually 31. The type locality is in Minas Gerais, Brazil.
