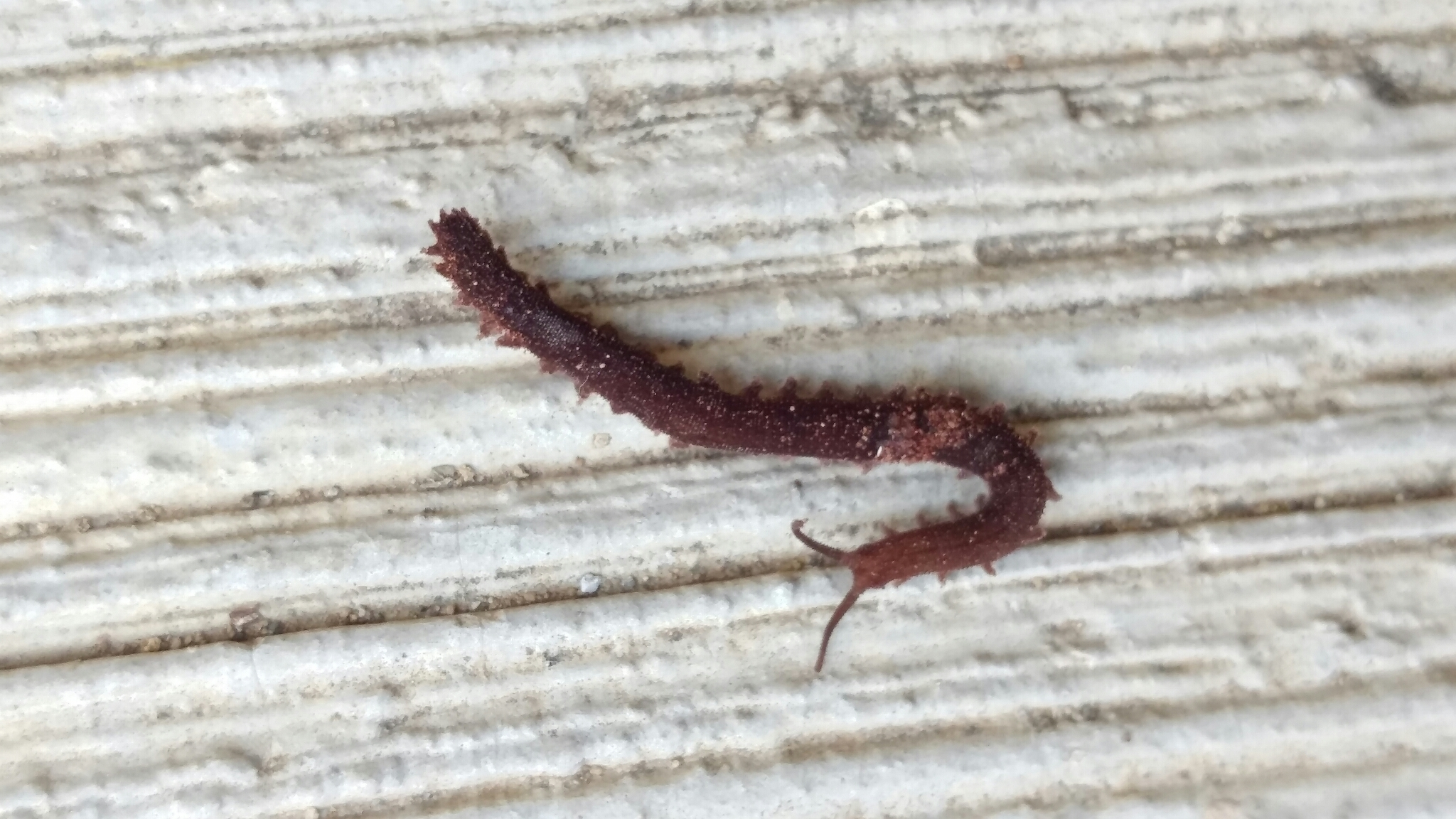

Scientific classification
- Kingdom: Animalia
- Phylum: Onychophora
- Family: Peripatidae
- Genus: Oroperipatus
- Species: O. eisenii

Binomial name
- Oroperipatus eisenii (Wheeler, 1898)

Synonyms
- Peripatus eisenii (Wheeler, 1898); Oroperipatus eiseni (Clark, 1913)

= Oroperipatus eisenii =

Species of Peripatid velvet worm

Oroperipatus eisenii is a species of velvet worm in the family Peripatidae. Females of this species have 27 to 29 pairs of legs, usually 28; males have 23 to 26. Females range from 30 mm to 57 mm in length, while males range from 20 mm to 23 mm. The type locality is found in Brazil and central Mexico.
