= Oroperipatus corradoi =

Scientific classification
- Kingdom: Animalia
- Phylum: Onychophora
- Family: Peripatidae
- Genus: Oroperipatus
- Species: O. corradoi

Binomial name
- Oroperipatus corradoi (Camerano, 1898)

Synonyms
- Peripatus corradi (Camerano, 1898); Peripatus corradoi (Bouvier, 1905)

Species of Peripatid velvet worm

Oroperipatus corradoi is a species of velvet worm in the Peripatidae family. Females of this species have 26 to 29 pairs of legs, usually 28; males have 24 to 27. Females range from 14 mm to 60 mm in length, while males range from 14 mm to 25 mm in length. The type locality is in Ecuador.
