= Epiperipatus paurognostus =

Scientific classification
- Kingdom: Animalia
- Phylum: Onychophora
- Family: Peripatidae
- Genus: Epiperipatus
- Species: E. paurognostus

Binomial name
- Epiperipatus paurognostus Oliveira et al., 2011

Synonyms
- Epiperipatus schedocrypticus (Lacorte et al., 2010)

Species of velvet worm

Epiperipatus paurognostus is a species of velvet worm in the Peripatidae family. This species is brown with a series of light brown arcs on each side forming circles down its back. Males of this species have 26 or 27 pairs of legs, usually 27; females have 27 to 29, usually 29. The type locality is in Minas Gerais, Brazil.
