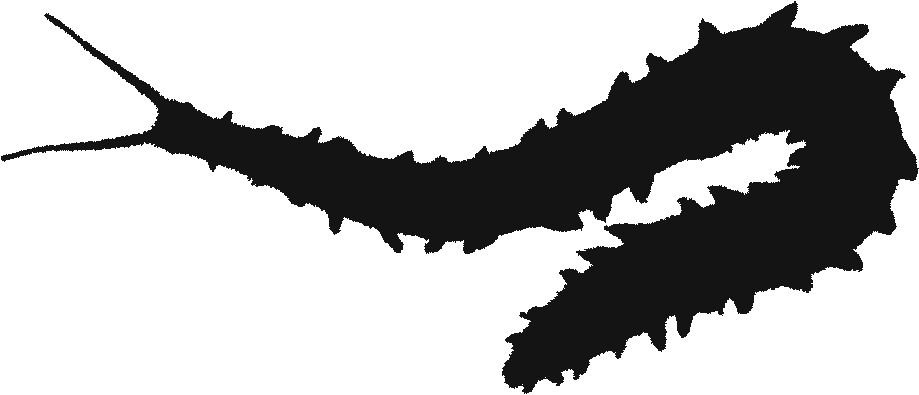
- Onychophoran silhouette

Scientific classification
- Kingdom: Animalia
- Phylum: Onychophora
- Family: Peripatidae
- Genus: Epiperipatus
- Species: E. imthurni

Binomial name
- Epiperipatus imthurni (Sclater, 1888)

Synonyms
- Peripatus demeraranus (Sedgwick, 1888); Peripatus imthurni (Sclater, 1888); Peripatus (Epiperipatus) imthurmi (Clark, 1913)

= Epiperipatus imthurni =

Species of velvet worm

Epiperipatus imthurni is a species of velvet worm in the family Peripatidae. This species ranges from light orange or yellowish brown to a dark brown on its dorsal surface; the ventral surface is a lighter orange-ish shade of the same color. This species is native to Trinidad and has also been recorded in parts of northern South America, including Guyana. No males have been recorded from this species. Females can reach a large size, up to 2.25 g in weight, and range from 25 mm up to 96 mm in length. They have 29 to 32 pairs of legs, usually 30 or 31. Females from Trinidad were shown to reproduce via parthenogenesis; the only velvet worm known to do so.

== Taxonomy ==
Epiperipatus imthurni was first described by Philip Lutley Sclater in 1888 based on specimens collected from British Guiana (now Guyana) by Everard im Thurn, after whom the species is named. Initially placed in the genus Peripatus, the species was later reassigned to the genus Epiperipatus following taxonomic revisions within the phylum Onychophora. The genus Epiperipatus is part of the family Peripatidae, which contains primarily tropical and subtropical velvet worm species.

The taxonomy of velvet worms has undergone significant changes due to advances in molecular phylogenetics. Species previously grouped based on morphological traits are now being reassessed using DNA sequencing, leading to the discovery of cryptic species within what were once thought to be a single taxa.

== Description ==
The coloration ranges from pale orange or yellowish-brown to darker reddish hues, with the ventral side typically being lighter than the dorsal surface. Females, which make up the entirety of the known population, vary in size from 25 mm to 96 mm in length and can weigh up to 2.25 grams. The species typically exhibits 29 to 32 pairs of legs, most commonly 30 or 31.

== Distribution and habitat ==
Epiperipatus imthurni is endemic to the island of Trinidad but has also been recorded in parts of northeastern South America, including Venezuela and Guyana. It inhabits moist tropical rainforests, where it is found in microhabitats that provide protection from desiccation and direct sunlight, such as under logs, stones, bark, and leaf litter.

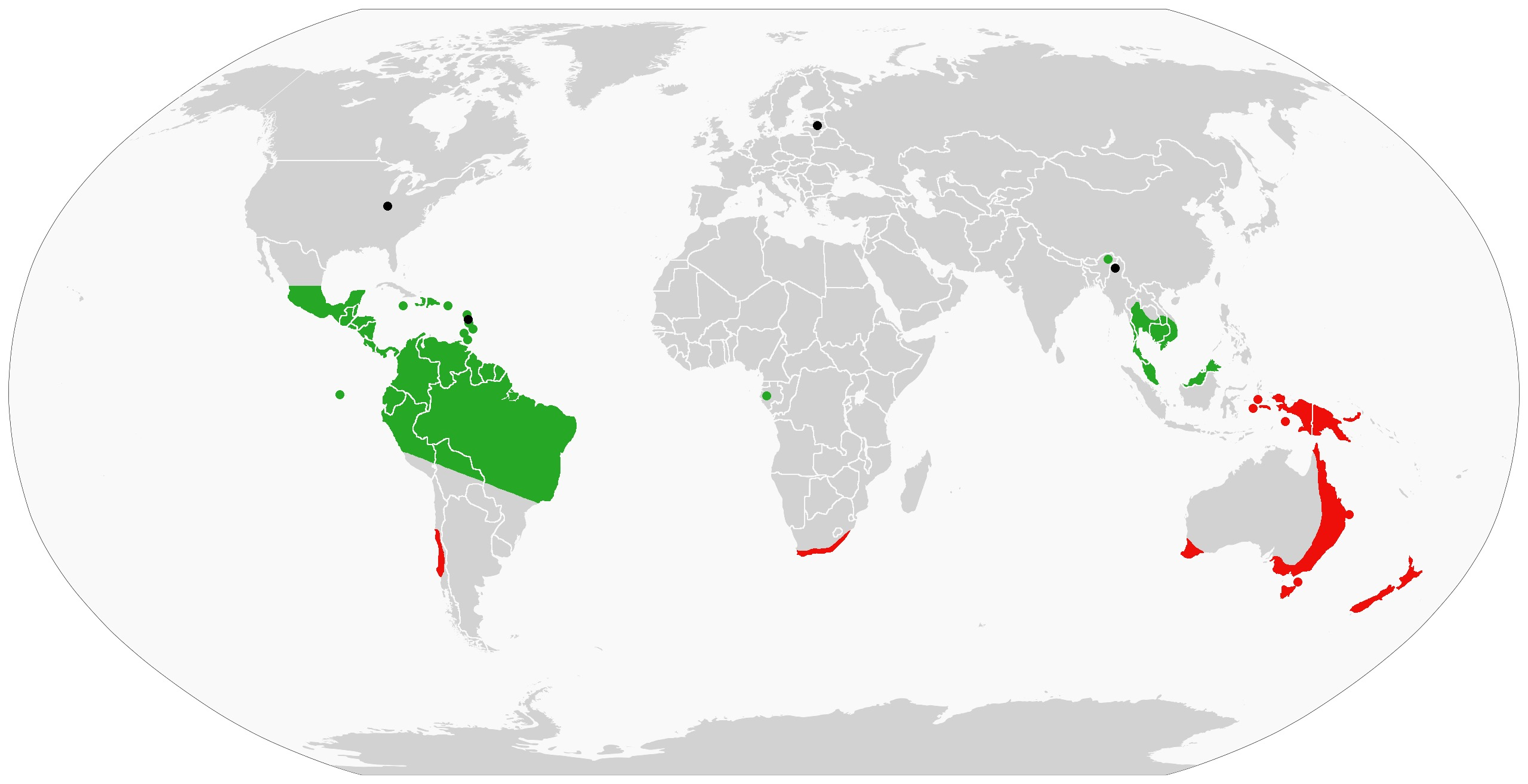
Global distribution map of the Onychophora

The species is highly sensitive to environmental conditions, particularly humidity, and tends to avoid open or dry environments. Like other velvet worms, it relies on a moist cuticle for respiration and therefore requires a stable climate with high humidity to survive. Habitat specificity and sensitivity to climate conditions make E. imthurni a good indicator species for ecological health and forest integrity.

== Reproduction ==
The most distinctive feature of E. imthurni is its mode of reproduction: parthenogenesis. This species reproduces asexually, and all known individuals are female. Embryos develop from unfertilized eggs, a reproductive strategy that is exceedingly rare among onychophora.

Parthenogenesis in E. imthurni has been verified through extensive field and laboratory studies. No male specimens have ever been identified in the populations studied in Trinidad and Guyana. The exact mechanisms of parthenogenesis in this species are still under investigation, but it is thought to involve automixis with central fusion, preserving genetic heterozygosity.

This reproductive strategy may have evolved in response to environmental pressures such as isolation, limited mate availability, or stable ecological niches where genetic variation is less critical for survival. It also allows for rapid population expansion in suitable environments.

== Behavior and ecology ==
Epiperipatus imthurni is a slow-moving, nocturnal predator. Like other velvet worms, it uses specialized oral papillae to expel adhesive slime to capture prey. The slime, composed of proteins and water, is ejected into streams that entangle small invertebrates such as termites, isopods, and other arthropods.

After subduing its prey, the worm uses its jaws to puncture and inject digestive enzymes, liquefying the prey's internal tissues for ingestion. This external digestion strategy is common among Onychophora.

In addition to predatory behavior, E. imthurni exhibits many of the general traits seen in other velvet worms, such as photophobia (light avoidance), a reliance on humid environments, and the use of antennae and body papillae for navigation and environmental sensing.

== Conservation status ==
As of 2024, Epiperipatus imthurni has not been assessed by the International Union for Conservation of Nature (IUCN) and therefore does not have an official conservation status. However, its reliance on undisturbed tropical forest habitats makes it potentially vulnerable to habitat degradation and deforestation, particularly in Trinidad and Guyana, where deforestation rates have risen in recent decades.

Given its narrow range, specialized habitat requirements, and unique reproductive biology, E. imthurni may be at risk from ongoing environmental changes, and future conservation assessments are warranted.
