= Epiperipatus evansi =

Scientific classification
- Kingdom: Animalia
- Phylum: Onychophora
- Family: Peripatidae
- Genus: Epiperipatus
- Species: E. evansi

Binomial name
- Epiperipatus evansi (Bouvier, 1904)

Synonyms
- Peripatus evansi (Bouvier 1904); Peripatus (Epiperipatus) evansi (Clark 1913)

Species of velvet worm

Epiperipatus evansi is a species of velvet worm in the Peripatidae family. This species is a purplish dark brown with a series of bright triangles on each side forming a series of diamonds down its back. Females of this species have 28 pairs of legs and range from 32 mm to 58 mm in length. The type locality is in Guyana.
