= Macroperipatus valerioi =

Scientific classification
- Kingdom: Animalia
- Phylum: Onychophora
- Family: Peripatidae
- Genus: Macroperipatus
- Species: M. valerioi

Binomial name
- Macroperipatus valerioi Morera-Brenes & Léon, 1986

Species of velvet worm

Macroperipatus valerioi is a species of velvet worm in the Peripatidae family. Females of this species have 34 pairs of legs. The type locality is in Costa Rica.
