= Oroperipatus tuberculatus =

Scientific classification
- Kingdom: Animalia
- Phylum: Onychophora
- Family: Peripatidae
- Genus: Oroperipatus
- Species: O. tuberculatus

Binomial name
- Oroperipatus tuberculatus (Bouvier, 1898)

Synonyms
- Peripatus tuberculatus (Bouvier, 1898)

Species of Peripatid velvet worm

Oroperipatus tuberculatus is a species of velvet worm in the Peripatidae family. This species has 37 pairs of legs. The type locality is in Colombia.
