= Epiperipatus diadenoproctus =

Scientific classification
- Kingdom: Animalia
- Phylum: Onychophora
- Family: Peripatidae
- Genus: Epiperipatus
- Species: E. diadenoproctus

Binomial name
- Epiperipatus diadenoproctus Oliveira et al. 2011

Species of velvet worm

Epiperipatus diadenoproctus is a species of velvet worm in the Peripatidae family. This species is brown with a series of light brown arcs on each side forming circles down its back. Males of this species have 26 to 28 pairs of legs, usually 27; females have 29 or 30, usually 29. The type locality is in Minas Gerais, Brazil.
