= Epiperipatus torrealbai =

Scientific classification
- Kingdom: Animalia
- Phylum: Onychophora
- Family: Peripatidae
- Genus: Epiperipatus
- Species: E. torrealbai

Binomial name
- Epiperipatus torrealbai Scorza, 1953

Species of velvet worm

Epiperipatus torrealbai is a species of velvet worm in the family Peripatidae. This species is dark reddish brown without any pattern on its dorsal surface. The female of this species has 31 pairs of legs. The type locality is in Venezuela.
