= Epiperipatus bernali =

Scientific classification
- Kingdom: Animalia
- Phylum: Onychophora
- Family: Peripatidae
- Genus: Epiperipatus
- Species: E. bernali

Binomial name
- Epiperipatus bernali Costa & Giribet, 2021

Species of velvet worm

Epiperipatus bernali is a species of velvet worm in the family Peripatidae. This species has 31 or 32 pairs of legs.
