= Macroperipatus insularis =

Conservation status
- Endangered (IUCN 2.3)

Scientific classification
- Kingdom: Animalia
- Phylum: Onychophora
- Family: Peripatidae
- Genus: Macroperipatus
- Species: M. insularis

Binomial name
- Macroperipatus insularis Clark, 1937

Synonyms
- Macroperipatus insularis insularis (Peck, 1975)

Species of velvet worm

Macroperipatus insularis is a species of velvet worm in the Peripatidae family. It is found in Jamaica, and Hispaniola (the Dominican Republic and Haiti). The original description of this species is based on a female specimen, 55 mm long, with 30 pairs of legs.

== Conservation ==
Macroperipatus insularis is listed as Endangered on the IUCN Red List.
