= Epiperipatus betheli =

Scientific classification
- Kingdom: Animalia
- Phylum: Onychophora
- Family: Peripatidae
- Genus: Epiperipatus
- Species: E. betheli

Binomial name
- Epiperipatus betheli (Cockerell, 1913)

Synonyms
- Peripatus (Epiperipatus) biolleyi var. betheli (Cockerell 1913)

Species of velvet worm

Epiperipatus betheli is a species of velvet worm in the family Peripatidae. The original description of this species is based on a dark brown female specimen, 34 mm long, with 30 pairs of legs. The type locality is in Guatemala.
