= Epiperipatus lewisi =

Scientific classification
- Kingdom: Animalia
- Phylum: Onychophora
- Family: Peripatidae
- Genus: Epiperipatus
- Species: E. lewisi

Binomial name
- Epiperipatus lewisi Arnett, 1961

Species of velvet worm

Epiperipatus lewisi is a species of velvet worm in the Peripatidae family. This species varies from grey to dark reddish brown on its dorsal surface and has 34 to 36 pairs of legs. The type locality is in Jamaica.
