= Macroperipatus clarki =

Scientific classification
- Kingdom: Animalia
- Phylum: Onychophora
- Family: Peripatidae
- Genus: Macroperipatus
- Species: M. clarki

Binomial name
- Macroperipatus clarki Arnett, 1961

Synonyms
- Macroperipatus insularis clarki (Arnett, 1961)

Species of velvet worm

Macroperipatus clarki is a species of velvet worm in the Peripatidae family. This species has 34 to 36 pairs of legs. The type locality is in Jamaica.
