= Macroperipatus perrieri =

Scientific classification
- Kingdom: Animalia
- Phylum: Onychophora
- Family: Peripatidae
- Genus: Macroperipatus
- Species: M. perrieri

Binomial name
- Macroperipatus perrieri (Bouvier, 1899)

Synonyms
- Peripatus perrieri (Bouvier 1899); Peripatus (Macroperipatus) perrieri (Clark 1913)

Species of velvet worm

Macroperipatus perrieri is a species of velvet worm in the Peripatidae family. This species has 28 to 32 pairs of legs. The type locality is in Mexico.
