= Epiperipatus simoni =

Scientific classification
- Kingdom: Animalia
- Phylum: Onychophora
- Family: Peripatidae
- Genus: Epiperipatus
- Species: E. simoni

Binomial name
- Epiperipatus simoni (Bouvier, 1899)

Synonyms
- Peripatus simoni (Bouvier 1899); Peripatus (Epiperipatus) simoni (Clark 1913)

Species of velvet worm

Epiperipatus simoni is a species of velvet worm in the Peripatidae family. This species is dark brown without any pattern on its dorsal surface. Females of this species range from 40 mm to 68 mm in length and have 28 to 32 pairs of legs. The type locality is in Venezuela.
