= Epiperipatus beckeri =

Scientific classification
- Kingdom: Animalia
- Phylum: Onychophora
- Family: Peripatidae
- Genus: Epiperipatus
- Species: E. beckeri

Binomial name
- Epiperipatus beckeri Costa, Chagas & Pinto-da-Rocha, 2018

Species of velvet worm

Epiperipatus beckeri is a species of velvet worm in the family Peripatidae. Females of this species have 28 to 30 pairs of legs. The type locality is in Bahia state in Brazil.
