= Epiperipatus barbadensis =

Scientific classification
- Kingdom: Animalia
- Phylum: Onychophora
- Family: Peripatidae
- Genus: Epiperipatus
- Species: E. barbadensis

Binomial name
- Epiperipatus barbadensis (Froehlich, 1962)

Synonyms
- Peripatus (Peripatus) dominicae barbadensis (Froehlich 1962); Peripatus dominicae barbadensis (Peck 1975)

Species of velvet worm

Epiperipatus barbadensis is a species of velvet worm in the Peripatidae family, first described based on specimens from Barbados. It is one of the velvet worms that most often is kept in captivity, and was the first member of the Peripatidae family to be successfully maintained by hobbyist invertebrate keepers; it is easier to keep than the majority of other velvet worm species that have been tried, but still has specialized requirements that resemble those necessary for keeping poison dart frogs. E. barbadensis is social, nocturnal (it is photophobic and small groups rest together in tight spaces during the day) and viviparous, can live for several years, and feeds on small invertebrates that (like in other velvet worms) are caught by ejecting an adhesive slime from glands on their head.

This velvet worm is a uniform brown on its upper surface. The original description of this species was based on female specimens ranging from 17 to 32 mm (0.67–1.26 in) in length, but adult females usually are between 75 and 90 mm (3.0–3.5 in), while males remain somewhat smaller. Females have 31 pairs of legs.
