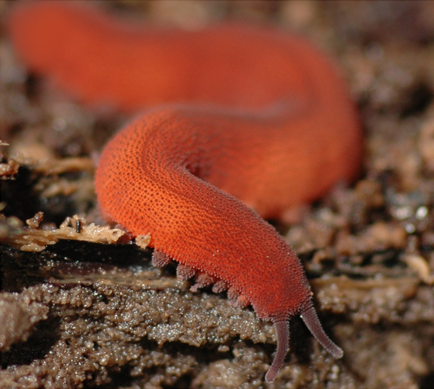

Scientific classification
- Kingdom: Animalia
- Phylum: Onychophora
- Family: Peripatidae
- Genus: Epiperipatus
- Species: E. biolleyi

Binomial name
- Epiperipatus biolleyi (Bouvier, 1902)

Synonyms
- Peripatus biolleyi (Bouvier, 1902)

= Epiperipatus biolleyi =

Species of velvet worm

Epiperipatus biolleyi is a species of velvet worm in the Peripatidae family. This species is red, without any pattern, on its dorsal surface. Females of this species have 28 to 32 pairs of legs; males have 25 to 30. Females range from 18 mm to 75 mm in length, with a mean length of 52 mm, whereas males range from 18 mm to 55 mm, with a mean length of 38 mm. The type locality is in Costa Rica.
