= Macroperipatus ohausi =

Scientific classification
- Kingdom: Animalia
- Phylum: Onychophora
- Family: Peripatidae
- Genus: Macroperipatus
- Species: M. ohausi

Binomial name
- Macroperipatus ohausi (Bouvier, 1900)

Synonyms
- Peripatus ohausi (Bouvier 1900); Peripatus (Macroperipatus) ohausi (Clark 1913)

Species of velvet worm

Macroperipatus ohausi is a species of velvet worm in the Peripatidae family. Females of this species have 27 or 28 pairs of legs. The type locality is Rio de Janeiro, Brazil.
