= Heteroperipatus clarki =

Scientific classification
- Kingdom: Animalia
- Phylum: Onychophora
- Family: Peripatidae
- Genus: Heteroperipatus
- Species: H. clarki

Binomial name
- Heteroperipatus clarki (Dunn, 1943)

Synonyms
- Peripatus clarki (Dunn, 1943)

Species of Peripatid velvet worm

Heteroperipatus clarki is a species of velvet worm in the Peripatidae family. Females of this species have 26 to 29 pairs of legs. The original description of this species is based on a female specimen measuring 100 mm in length. The type locality is in Panama.
