= Macroperipatus torquatus =

Scientific classification
- Kingdom: Animalia
- Phylum: Onychophora
- Family: Peripatidae
- Genus: Macroperipatus
- Species: M. torquatus

Binomial name
- Macroperipatus torquatus (von Kennel, 1883)

Synonyms
- Peripatus torquatus (von Kennel 1883); Peripatus (Macroperipatus) torquatus (Clark 1913)

Species of velvet worm

Macroperipatus torquatus is a species of velvet worm in the Peripatidae family. This species has a brown or red back with a bright yellow collar, a black head with black antennae, a white underside with a red tint, and 37 to 42 pairs of legs (usually 39 to 41 leg pairs, with 41 as the most common number). These velvet worms range from 100 mm to 150 mm in length. This species is notable for its numerous legs and its large size, with mature females ranging from 1.75 g to as much as 5.68 g in weight. This species is found in Trinidad.
