= Oroperipatus bimbergi =

Scientific classification
- Kingdom: Animalia
- Phylum: Onychophora
- Family: Peripatidae
- Genus: Oroperipatus
- Species: O. bimbergi

Binomial name
- Oroperipatus bimbergi (Fuhrmann, 1913)

Synonyms
- Peripatus bimbergi (Fuhrmann, 1913)

Species Peripatid of velvet worm

Oroperipatus bimbergi is a species of velvet worm in the Peripatidae family. The female of this species has 27 or 28 pairs of legs, usually 27; the male has 24 or 25 usually, rarely 26. The type locality is in Colombia.
