= Oroperipatus soratanus =

Scientific classification
- Kingdom: Animalia
- Phylum: Onychophora
- Family: Peripatidae
- Genus: Oroperipatus
- Species: O. soratanus

Binomial name
- Oroperipatus soratanus (Bouvier, 1901)

Synonyms
- Peripatus soratanus (Bouvier, 1901)

Species of Peripatid velvet worm

Oroperipatus soratanus is a species of velvet worm in the Peripatidae family. Females of this species have 32 pairs of legs; males have 28. The type locality is in Bolivia.
