= Oroperipatus peruvianus =

Scientific classification
- Kingdom: Animalia
- Phylum: Onychophora
- Family: Peripatidae
- Genus: Oroperipatus
- Species: O. peruvianus

Binomial name
- Oroperipatus peruvianus (Brues, 1917)

Synonyms
- Peripatus (Oroperipatus) peruvianus Brues, 1917

Species of Peripatid velvet worm

Oroperipatus peruvianus is a species of velvet worm in the Peripatidae family. Males of this species can feature 34 pairs of legs, whereas females can feature either 36 or 37 pairs. This velvet worm is found in Peru, Ecuador, and Colombia.

== Discovery ==
This species was first described in 1917 by the American biologist Charles T. Brues. He based the original description of this species on six specimens (four females and two males). These specimens were collected in 1916 by the American zoologist Gladwyn K. Noble, who found them beneath stones by a roadside in a moderately dry location at an elevation of about 6,000 feet (1,830 meters) in the district of Tabaconas in the province of San Ignacio in the department of Cajamarca in Peru. The female holotype, three female paratypes, and two male specimens are deposited in the Museum of Comparative Zoology at Harvard University.

== Taxonomy ==
Brues originally described this species in 1917 under the name Peritpatus (Oroperipatus) peruvianus. Since then, Brues and other authors have used the name Oroperipatus peruvianus instead, following the proposal by the American zoologist Austin Hobart Clark, who elevated Oroperipatus from a subgenus to a genus in 1913. Accordingly, authorities now accept Oroperipatus peruvianus as the valid name for this species.

== Distribution ==
Since the discovery of this species in Tabaconas in Peru, this species has been recorded in several other localities, not only in Peru but also in Ecuador and Colombia. In Peru, this species has also been found at an elevation of about 2,300 meters in the province of Cajamarca. In Ecuador, this species has been found at elevations of 646 meters and 2,087 meters in the province of Napo, as well as on Santa Cruz Island in the Galápagos archipelago, not only in a cave but also at the surface. In Colombia, this species has been found in Envigado in the department of Antioquia, in San Antonio del Tequendama in the department of Cundinamarca, and at an elevation of 1,840 meters in El Tambo in the department of Cauca.

== Description ==
The four female type specimens range from 55 mm to 61 mm in length and from 7.5 mm to 9.0 mm in width. These females have either 36 or 37 pairs of legs, with two specimens featuring each number, whereas both of the original male specimens feature 34 leg pairs. The body of this velvet worm is a uniform deep brown with a distinct yellowish band behind the antennae. The sole of each foot has five pads. The nephridial tubercles of the fourth and fifth leg pairs are nearly included in the third pad, which is deeply notched but not completely divided by the tubercle. The fourth pad is indented on its distal margin opposite the tubercle. The feet feature four and sometimes five papillae. The inner blade of the jaw features two prominent accessory teeth and a smaller third accessory tooth, immediately followed by seven or eight denticles with no diastema.
