= Epiperipatus barbouri =

Scientific classification
- Kingdom: Animalia
- Phylum: Onychophora
- Family: Peripatidae
- Genus: Epiperipatus
- Species: E. barbouri

Binomial name
- Epiperipatus barbouri (Brues, 1911)

Synonyms
- Peripatus barbouri (Brues 1911)

Species of velvet worm

Epiperipatus barbouri is a species of velvet worm in the Peripatidae family. This species is a dark purple, almost black, without any pattern on its dorsal surface. The ventral surface is much lighter and purplish pink. Females of this species have 30 to 34 pairs of legs. The type locality is in Grenada.
