= Epiperipatus trinidadensis =

Scientific classification
- Kingdom: Animalia
- Phylum: Onychophora
- Family: Peripatidae
- Genus: Epiperipatus
- Species: E. trinidadensis

Binomial name
- Epiperipatus trinidadensis (Sedgwick, 1888)

Synonyms
- Peripatus trinidadensis (Sedgwick 1888); Peripatus trinitatis (Bouvier 1905); Peripatus (Epiperipatus) trinidadensis (Clark 1913)

Species of velvet worm

Epiperipatus trinidadensis is a species of velvet worm in the Peripatidae family. Males of this species have 27 to 30 pairs of legs, usually 28; females have 28 to 31, usually 30. The type locality is in Trinidad.
