= Epiperipatus titanicus =

Scientific classification
- Kingdom: Animalia
- Phylum: Onychophora
- Family: Peripatidae
- Genus: Epiperipatus
- Species: E. titanicus

Binomial name
- Epiperipatus titanicus Costa, Chagas-Junior & Pinto-da-Rocha, 2018

Species of velvet worm

Epiperipatus titanicus is a species of velvet worm in the family Peripatidae. This velvet worm is known only from its type locality in the state of Alagoas in Brazil. The species name refers to the large size of its females (reaching 76 mm in length) and its numerous legs (as many as 39 pairs in females and 38 pairs in males). This species features more legs than any other Brazilian species of velvet worm.

== Discovery ==
This species was first described in 2018 by the zoologists Christiano Sampaio Costa, Amazonas Chagas-Junior, and Ricardo Pinto-da-Rocha. They based the original description of this species on a female holotype and 18 paratypes (twelve females, five males, and one unsexed specimen). These specimens were all found in the Murici Ecological Station in the municipality of Murici in the state of Alagoas in Brazil.

The holotype and 15 paratypes were deposited in the Museu Nacional do Rio de Janeiro in Brazil but destroyed in a fire in 2019. Two female paratypes are deposited in the Universidade Federal de Minas Gerais in Belo Horizonte in Brazil. Another female paratype is deposited in the Museu de Zoologia da Universidade de São Paulo in Brazil.

== Phylogeny ==
A phylogenetic analysis based on molecular data and morphology places Epiperipatus titanicus in a clade with a closely related species, Epiperipatus lucerna. This clade forms a sister group for Epiperipatus hyperbolicus, which is the next closest relative among all the described species of Epiperipatus in this analysis. These three species were discovered in the same rotten log in the Murici Ecological Station and were described together by the same three zoologists in 2018.

== Description ==
The females of this species range from 16 mm to 76 mm in length, and the males range from 29 mm to 41 mm in length. The females have 36 to 39 pairs of legs, while the males have 36 to 38 leg pairs. The jaw features two blades, an inner blade and an outer blade, each with a long curved main tooth and one accessory tooth. In males of this species, two or three pairs of the pregenital legs feature crural papillae (tubercles), with one papilla per leg.

The background color of the body in living specimens is a dark grayish red, with a wavy band of light grayish red on the dorsal surface that is overlaid with dark grayish red marks shaped like diamonds. The body also features a dark purplish red furrow down the middle of the back. The anterior part of the head and the antennae are dark purple. The ventral surface of the body and legs are pale pink, but the dorsal surface of the legs matches the background color of the body.

The largest primary papillae are pale, and the number of these pale primary papillae increases near the legs. The basal piece of the primary papillae features five to ten scale ranks. The apical piece is conical, symmetrical, and short, with only one row of narrow and elongated scales. Such a small apical piece with only one scale rank is rarely observed in the family Peripatidae. A needle-shaped sensory bristle emerges from the center of the apical piece. The accessory papillae are smaller than the primary papillae and have no apical piece.

This species exhibits traits considered diagnostic for the genus Epiperipatus. These traits include the number of pregenital legs with crural papillae in males and the number of scale ranks at the base of the primary papillae. Furthermore, like other species in this genus, this species features nephridial tubercles on the fourth and fifth leg pairs, with each tubercle located between the third and fourth spinous pads on the soles of the feet.

This species shares a more extensive set of traits with its close relatives, E. lucerna and E. hyperbolicus. For example, all three species exhibits the same dorsal background color and the same arrangement of pale primary papillae. Furthermore, all three species feature one accessory tooth in addition to the main tooth on both the inner and outer jaw blades. Moreover, the males of each species feature pregenital legs with crural papillae, with one crural papilla per leg.

These three species can be distinguished, however, by the apical piece of their primary papillae. In E. titanicus, this piece is conical with a symmetric distribution of scales, which are reduced to one rank. In E. lucerna, this piece is also conical, but with an asymmetric distribution of scales: three scale ranks in the front and two in the back. In E. hyperbolicus, this piece is large and spherical, with an asymmetric distribution of scales: six or seven scale ranks in the front and three in the back. Furthermore, E. titanicus features more legs (36 to 39 pairs) than either E. lucerna (27 to 31 pairs) or E. hyperbolicus (23 to 25 pairs).
