= Macroperipatus =

Scientific classification
- Kingdom: Animalia
- Phylum: Onychophora
- Family: Peripatidae
- Genus: Macroperipatus; Clark, 1913

Species
- See text

Genus of Peripatid velvet worm

Macroperipatus is a genus of Neotropical velvet worms in the Peripatidae family. Velvet worms in this genus can have as few as 24 pairs of legs (in M. guianensis) or as many as 42 leg pairs (in M. torquatus). This genus is viviparous, with mothers supplying nourishment to their embryos through a placenta.

== Species ==
The genus contains the following species:

- Macroperipatus clarki Arnett, 1961
- Macroperipatus guianensis (Evans, 1903)
- Macroperipatus insularis Clark, 1937
- Macroperipatus ohausi Bouvier, 1900
- Macroperipatus perrieri (Bouvier, 1899)
- Macroperipatus torquatus (von Kennel, 1883)
- Macroperipatus valerioi Morera-Brenes and León, 1986

Macroperipatus geayi (Bouvier, 1899) is considered a nomen dubium by Oliveira et al. 2012.
