= Plicatoperipatus =

Conservation status
- Near Threatened (IUCN 2.3)

Scientific classification
- Kingdom: Animalia
- Phylum: Onychophora
- Family: Peripatidae
- Genus: Plicatoperipatus; Clark, 1913
- Species: P. jamaicensis

Binomial name
- Plicatoperipatus jamaicensis (Grabham & Cockerell, 1892)

Genus and species of Peripatid velvet worm

Plicatoperipatus is a monospecific genus of velvet worm containing the single species Plicatoperipatus jamaicensis. It is endemic to Jamaica.

== Description ==
Females of this species can have as many as 43 pairs of legs, the maximum number found in the phylum Onychophora. In a large sample collected in 1988, however, females ranged from 35 to 39 leg pairs, with 37 as the mean and the most common number, and males ranged from 31 to 37 leg pairs, with 35 as the mean and the most common number. This species ranges from 25 mm to 65 mm in length. In the 1988 sample, the mean length for males was 33 mm, and the mean length for mature females was 51 mm. This species is viviparous, with mothers supplying nourishment to their embryos through a placenta.

== Conservation ==
This species is listed as Near Threatened by the IUCN Red List.
