= Oroperipatus ecuadorensis =

Scientific classification
- Kingdom: Animalia
- Phylum: Onychophora
- Family: Peripatidae
- Genus: Oroperipatus
- Species: O. ecuadorensis

Binomial name
- Oroperipatus ecuadorensis (Bouvier, 1902)

Synonyms
- Oroperipatus ecuadoriensis (Bouvier, 1902); Oroperipatus equadoriensis (Bouvier, 1902); Peripatus ecuadoriensis Bouvier, 1902

Species of Peripatid velvet worm

Oroperipatus ecuadorensis is a species of velvet worm in the Peripatidae family. The original description of this species is based on a female specimen notable for its large size (67 mm in length); this description also reports 39 pairs of legs. The type locality is in Ecuador.
