= Cerradopatus =

Scientific classification
- Kingdom: Animalia
- Phylum: Onychophora
- Family: Peripatidae
- Genus: Cerradopatus; Oliveira et al. 2015
- Species: C. sucuriuensis

Binomial name
- Cerradopatus sucuriuensis Oliveira et al. 2015

Genus and species of Peripatid velvet worm

Cerradopatus is a monospecific genus of velvet worm containing the single species Cerradopatus sucuriuensis. Males of this species have 28 or 29 pairs of legs; females have 30 to 32. This species is native to the Brazilian savannah. This species is viviparous, with mothers supplying nourishment to their embryos through a placenta.
