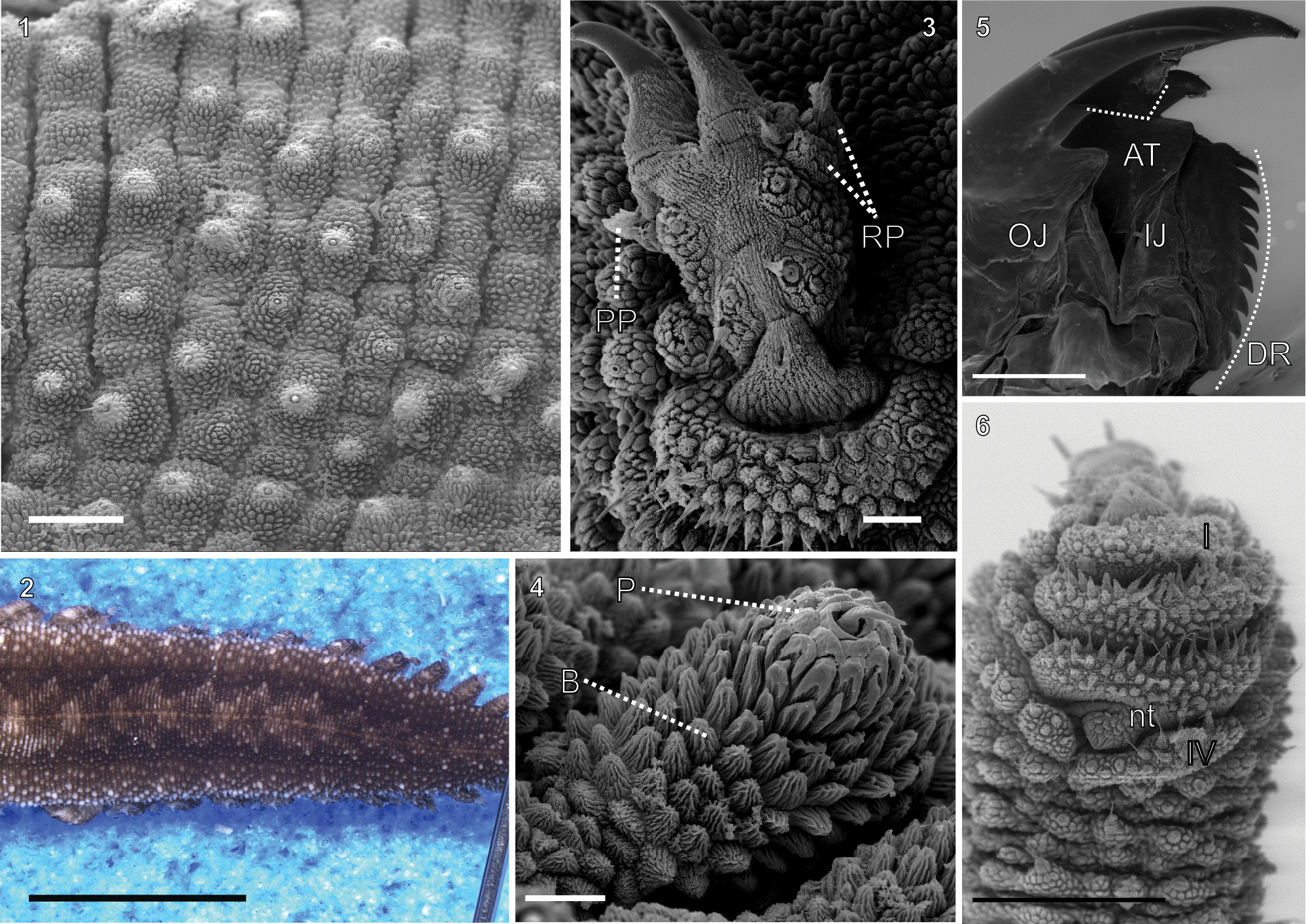
- Figures 1–6; Epiperipatus edwardsii, GF180312HC003-06: (1) dorsal papillae arrangement; (2) dorsal view of the distal half of the body depicting diamond shaped pattern over the dorsomedian furrow; (3) foot in ventral view; (4) primary papillae in posterior view depicting differences in the number and shape of the scales (B and P); (5) outer blade in first plan of right jaw; (6) right fourth leg in ventral view depicting spinous pad undivided (I) and divided (IV) into two unequal parts. (AT) Accessory tooth, (B) basal piece, (DR) series of denticles, (I) first spinous pads, (IJ) inner blade, (IV) last spinous pads, (nt) nephridial tubercle, (OJ) outer blade, (P) apical piece, (PP) prolateral foot papillae, (RP) retrolateral foot papillae. Scale bars: 1, 5 = 100 µm, 2 = 5 mm, 3 = 30 µm, 4 = 20 µm, 6 = 200 µm.

Scientific classification
- Kingdom: Animalia
- Phylum: Onychophora
- Family: Peripatidae
- Genus: Epiperipatus
- Species: E. edwardsii

Binomial name
- Epiperipatus edwardsii (Blanchard, 1847)

Synonyms
- Peripatus edwardsii (Blanchard 1847); Peripatus (Epiperipatus) edwardsii (Clark 1913)

= Epiperipatus edwardsii =

Species of velvet worm

Epiperipatus edwardsii is a species of velvet worm in the family Peripatidae. Females of this species have 29 to 34 pairs of legs; males have 28 to 30. Females range from 23 mm to 56 mm in length, whereas males range from 25 mm to 30 mm. The type locality is in French Guiana.
