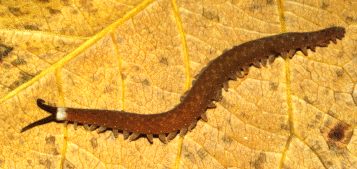
- An Oroperipatus species

Scientific classification
- Kingdom: Animalia
- Phylum: Onychophora
- Family: Peripatidae
- Genus: Oroperipatus; Cockerell, 1908

Species
- See text

= Oroperipatus =

Genus of Peripatid velvet worm

Oroperipatus is a genus of Neotropical velvet worms in the family Peripatidae. Species in this genus are found in South America west of the Andes and in Mexico. This genus is viviparous, with mothers supplying nourishment to their embryos through a placenta.

== Description ==
Velvet worms in this genus can have as few as 22 pairs of legs (in O. omeyrus) or as many as 40 leg pairs (in O. bluntschli, O. weyrauchi, and O. tiputini). Species in this genus have from four to seven distal foot papillae, with two or more on the anterior part of the foot and two or more on the posterior part of the foot. This genus also features a nephridial tubercle on the fourth and fifth leg pairs inserted into a complete third spinous pad.

== Species ==
The genus contains the following species:

- Oroperipatus balzani (Camerano, 1897)
- Oroperipatus belli (Bouvier, 1904)
- Oroperipatus bimbergi (Fuhrmann, 1913)
- Oroperipatus bluntschli Fuhrmann, 1915
- Oroperipatus cameranoi (Bouvier, 1899)
- Oroperipatus corradoi (Camerano, 1898)
- Oroperipatus ecuadorensis (Bouvier, 1902)
- Oroperipatus eisenii (Wheeler, 1898)
- Oroperipatus intermedius (Bouvier, 1901)
- Oroperipatus koepckei Zilch, 1954
- Oroperipatus lankesteri (Bouvier, 1899)
- Oroperipatus multipodes (Fuhrmann, 1913)
- Oroperipatus omeyrus Marcus, 1952
- Oroperipatus peruvianus Brues, 1917
- Oroperipatus soratanus (Bouvier, 1901)
- Oroperipatus tiputini Montalvo-Salazar et al., 2024
- Oroperipatus tuberculatus (Bouvier, 1898)
- Oroperipatus weyrauchi Marcus, 1952

Oroperipatus goudoti (Bouvier, 1899), Oroperipatus quitensis (Schmarda, 1871), and Oroperipatus peruanus (Grube, 1876) are considered nomina dubia by Oliveira et al. 2012.
