= Mongeperipatus kekoldi =

Scientific classification
- Kingdom: Animalia
- Phylum: Onychophora
- Family: Peripatidae
- Genus: Mongeperipatus
- Species: M. kekoldi

Binomial name
- Mongeperipatus kekoldi Barquero-González et al. 2020

Species of Peripatid velvet worm

Mongeperipatus kekoldi is a large species of velvet worm in the Peripatidae family. Males of this species have 32 or 33 pairs of legs and females have 37 to 39, but these numbers are based on only a few specimens. The large known specimen, an adult female, was 18 cm (7.1 in) long. This species is endemic to Costa Rica where it lives near streams in forests and semi-altered habitats.
