= Epiperipatus vagans =

Scientific classification
- Kingdom: Animalia
- Phylum: Onychophora
- Family: Peripatidae
- Genus: Epiperipatus
- Species: E. vagans

Binomial name
- Epiperipatus vagans (Brues, 1925)

Synonyms
- Peripatus (Epiperipatus) brasiliensis var. vagans(Brues 1925); Epiperipatus brasiliensis vagans (Peck 1975)

Species of velvet worm

Epiperipatus vagans is a species of velvet worm in the Peripatidae family. The male of this species has 29 or 30 pairs of legs; females have 32 or 33. The type locality is in Panama.
