= Epiperipatus isthmicola =

Scientific classification
- Kingdom: Animalia
- Phylum: Onychophora
- Family: Peripatidae
- Genus: Epiperipatus
- Species: E. isthmicola

Binomial name
- Epiperipatus isthmicola (Bouvier, 1902)

Synonyms
- Peripatus nicaraguensis var. isthmicola (Bouvier 1902); Peripatus (Epiperipatus) isthmicola (Clark 1913)

Species of velvet worm

Epiperipatus isthmicola is a species of velvet worm in the Peripatidae family. This species is a dark brown, almost black, without any pattern on its dorsal surface. Females of this species have 29 to 32 pairs of legs; males have 26 or 27. Females range from 20 mm to 73 mm in length, whereas males range from 20 mm to 48 mm. The type locality is in Costa Rica.
