= Oroperipatus bluntschli =

Scientific classification
- Kingdom: Animalia
- Phylum: Onychophora
- Family: Peripatidae
- Genus: Oroperipatus
- Species: O. bluntschli

Binomial name
- Oroperipatus bluntschli Fuhrmann, 1915

Species of Peripatid velvet worm

Oroperipatus bluntschli is a species of velvet worm in the Peripatidae family. The original description of this species is based on a female specimen measuring 100 mm in length; its 40 pairs of legs are notable for approaching the maximum number (43) recorded in velvet worms. The type locality is in Peru.
