= Revista de Biología Tropical =

- Discipline: Tropical biology, conservation biology
- Language: English, Spanish
- Edited by: Julián Monge-Nájera

Publication details
- History: 1953–present
- Publisher: University of Costa Rica (Costa Rica)
- Open access: Yes

Standard abbreviations
- ISO 4: Rev. Biol. Trop.

Indexing
- ISSN: 0034-7744 (print); 0034-7744 (web)

Links
- Journal homepage; Online access through SciELO

The Revista de Biología Tropical is a bilingual open access scientific journal published by the University of Costa Rica covering research in the field of tropical biology and conservation biology. It was established in 1953. It is indexed and abstracted in Current Contents, Science Citation Index and Biological Abstracts among others.
