= Oroperipatus weyrauchi =

Scientific classification
- Kingdom: Animalia
- Phylum: Onychophora
- Family: Peripatidae
- Genus: Oroperipatus
- Species: O. weyrauchi

Binomial name
- Oroperipatus weyrauchi Marcus, 1952

Species of Peripatid velvet worm

Oroperipatus weyrauchi is a species of velvet worm in the Peripatidae family. The original description of this species is based on only two specimens, a male (35 mm in length) with 40 pairs of legs and a larger female (45 mm in length) with 38 leg pairs. The type locality is in Peru.
