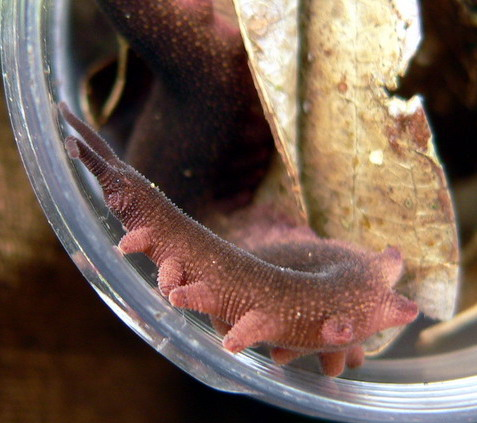
- Eoperipatus totoro

Scientific classification
- Kingdom: Animalia
- Phylum: Onychophora
- Family: Peripatidae
- Genus: Eoperipatus; Evans, 1901

Species
- See text

= Eoperipatus =

Genus of basal Peripatid velvet worms

Eoperipatus is a genus of velvet worms in the family Peripatidae. These velvet worms have been reported from locations throughout Southeast Asia, including Malaysia, Singapore, Thailand, and Vietnam. This genus exhibits lecithotrophic ovoviviparity; that is, mothers in this genus retain yolky eggs in their uteri.

== Taxonomy and etymology ==
This genus was first described in 1901 by Richard Evans of Jesus College at the University of Oxford. He proposed this genus to contain the newly discovered species E. horsti and E. weldoni as well as the species originally described as Peripatus sumatranus. The generic name Eoperipatus is derived from an Ancient Greek combining form of Ἠώς (ēṓs), meaning "dawn," and peripatos, meaning "walking about." This name refers to the distribution of these velvet worms in the Far East.

== Description ==
The number of legs in this genus varies within species as well as among species and ranges from 22 pairs (in E. butleri) to 25 pairs (in E. horsti and E. weldoni). In this genus, the crural tubercles form a single complex united by a dermal fold on each leg of two pregenital leg pairs. Males in this genus feature a single and medial anal gland opening on a pad in front of the anus. The male also features a circular pit on each quadrant of the genital pad, which is divided by a cruciform genital opening. The female genital opening is a transverse slit. Each leg features two distal foot papillae, one anterior and one posterior.

== Species ==
The genus contains the following described species:

- Eoperipatus butleri Evans, 1901
- Eoperipatus horsti Evans, 1901
- Eoperipatus totoro Oliveira et al., 2013
- Eoperipatus weldoni Evans, 1901

Eoperipatus sumatranus (Sedgwick, 1888) is considered a nomen dubium by Oliveira et al. 2012.

In addition to these species, an undescribed species is known to occur in Thailand. Furthermore, reports of Eoperipatus in Borneo and an unidentified velvet worm in central Vietnam, north of the known distribution of Eoperipatus totoro, may represent still more undescribed species of Eoperipatus.
