= Eoperipatus butleri =

Scientific classification
- Kingdom: Animalia
- Phylum: Onychophora
- Family: Peripatidae
- Genus: Eoperipatus
- Species: E. butleri

Binomial name
- Eoperipatus butleri Evans, 1901

Species of basal Peripatid velvet worm

Eoperipatus butleri is a Malaysian species of velvet worm in the Peripatidae family.

== Taxonomy ==
Eoperipatus butleri was described by Richard Evans in 1901, from a single female specimen discovered by A. M. Butler in the Larut Hills of West Malaysia. The generic name Eoperipatus is derived from an Ancient Greek combining form of ēṓs, meaning "dawn", and peripatos, meaning "walking about". The specific name butleri is in honour of its discoverer. Although some have suggested that E. butleri is a junior synonym of E. weldoni, other authorities maintain that E. butleri is valid as a different species, citing the significant distance (over 300 km) between the type localities of these two species.

== Description ==
The dorsal surface is dark brown with pale spots and a darker brown mid-dorsal line extending from the first pair of oncopods (legs) to the anus. The ventral surface is slightly lighter brown than the dorsal surface. The type specimen was 52 mm in length and 6 mm in width. The female of this species has 24 pairs of legs, but the male has only 22 leg pairs.
