= Heteroperipatus =

Scientific classification
- Kingdom: Animalia
- Phylum: Onychophora
- Family: Peripatidae
- Genus: Heteroperipatus; Zilch, 1954

Species
- See text

Genus of Peripatid velvet worm

Heteroperipatus is a genus of Central American velvet worms in the Peripatidae family. The number of legs in this genus varies within species as well as among species and ranges from 26 pairs (in H. clarki) to 32 pairs (in H. engelhardi). This genus is viviparous, with mothers supplying nourishment to their embryos through a placenta.

== Species ==
The genus contains the following two species:

- Heteroperipatus clarki (Dunn, 1943)
- Heteroperipatus engelhardi Zilch, 1954
