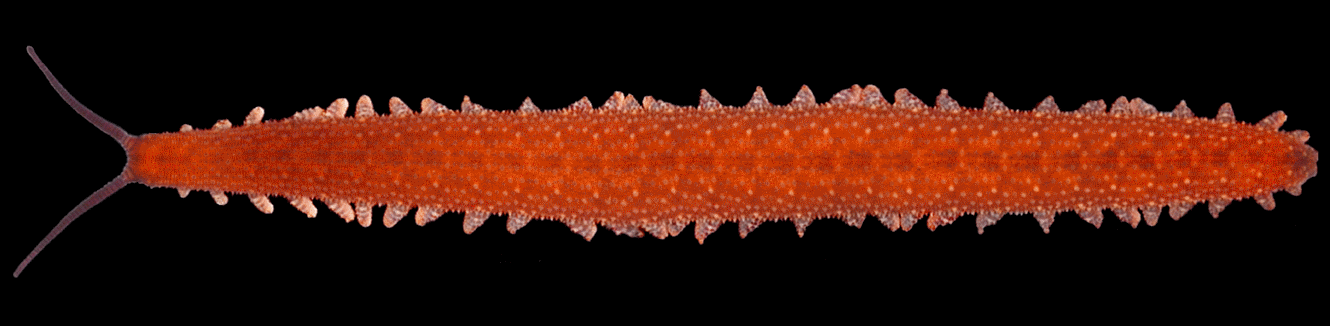

Scientific classification
- Kingdom: Animalia
- Phylum: Onychophora
- Family: Peripatidae
- Genus: Principapillatus; Oliveira et al. 2013
- Species: P. hitoyensis

Binomial name
- Principapillatus hitoyensis Oliveira et al. 2013

= Principapillatus =

Genus and species of Peripatid velvet worm

Principapillatus is a monospecific genus of velvet worm containing the single species Principapillatus hitoyensis. Males of this species have 26 to 29 pairs of legs, usually 27 or 28; females have 30 to 32, usually 30 or 31. This velvet worm is viviparous, with mothers supplying nourishment to their embryos through a placenta. This species was discovered in Costa Rica.
