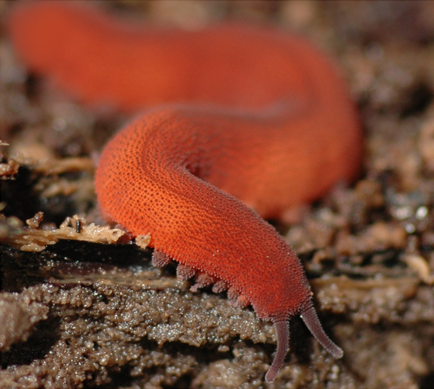
- Epiperipatus biolleyi

Scientific classification
- Kingdom: Animalia
- Phylum: Onychophora
- Family: Peripatidae
- Genus: Epiperipatus; Clark, 1913

Species
- See text

= Epiperipatus =

Genus of Peripatid velvet worm

Epiperipatus is the most diverse genus of neotropical velvet worms in the family Peripatidae. Species in this genus are found in Central and South America. This genus is viviparous, with mothers supplying nourishment to their embryos through a placenta.

== Description ==
Several traits are considered diagnostic for this genus. These traits include the number of scale ranks (four to eighteen) on the basal piece of the primary papillae, four complete spinous pads of the soles of the feet of the fourth and fifth pairs of legs, sometimes with vestiges of a fifth pad, a nephridial tubercle on the fourth and fifth leg pairs, located between the third and fourth spinous pads, and in males, one to three pairs of pregenital legs with crural papillae. Velvet worms in this genus can have as few as 23 leg pairs (in E. hyperbolicus) or as many as 39 leg pairs (in E. titanicus).

== Species ==
The genus contains the following species:

- Epiperipatus acacioi (Marcus & Marcus, 1955)
- Epiperipatus adenocryptus Oliveira et al., 2011
- Epiperipatus barbadensis (Froehlich, 1962)
- Epiperipatus barbouri (Brues, 1911)
- Epiperipatus beckeri Costa, Chagas & Pinto-da-Rocha, 2018
- Epiperipatus bernali Costa & Giribet, 2021
- Epiperipatus betheli (Cockerell, 1913)
- Epiperipatus biolleyi (Bouvier, 1902)
- Epiperipatus brasiliensis (Bouvier, 1899)
- Epiperipatus broadwayi (Clark, 1913)
- Epiperipatus cratensis Brito, Pereira, Ferreira, Vasconscellos & Almeida, 2010
- Epiperipatus diadenoproctus Oliveira et al., 2011
- Epiperipatus edwardsii (Blanchard, 1847)
- Epiperipatus evansi (Bouvier, 1904)
- Epiperipatus enymari Chagas-Jr & Costa, 2025
- Epiperipatus hilkae Morera-Brenes and Monge-Najera, 1990
- Epiperipatus hyperbolicus Costa, Chagas & Pinto-da-Rocha, 2018
- Epiperipatus imthurni (Sclater, 1888)
- Epiperipatus isthmicola (Bouvier, 1902)
- Epiperipatus lewisi (Arnett, 1961)
- Epiperipatus lucerna Costa, Chagas & Pinto-da-Rocha, 2018
- Epiperipatus machadoi (Oliveira & Wieloch, 2005)
- Epiperipatus marajoara Costa, Chagas & Pinto-da-Rocha, 2018
- Epiperipatus ohausi (Bouvier, 1900)
- Epiperipatus paurognostus Oliveira et al., 2011
- Epiperipatus puri Costa, Mendes & de Leão Giupponi, 2023
- Epiperipatus simoni (Bouvier, 1898)
- Epiperipatus titanicus Costa, Chagas & Pinto-da-Rocha, 2018
- Epiperipatus torrealbai Scorza, 1953
- Epiperipatus trinidadensis (Sedgwick, 1888)
- Epiperipatus vagans (Brues, 1925)
- Epiperipatus vespuccii Brues, 1914

Epiperipatus nicaraguensis (Bouvier, 1900) and Epiperipatus tucupi (Froehlich, 1968) are considered nomina dubia by Oliveira et al. 2012.
