= Eoperipatus weldoni =

Scientific classification
- Kingdom: Animalia
- Phylum: Onychophora
- Family: Peripatidae
- Genus: Eoperipatus
- Species: E. weldoni

Binomial name
- Eoperipatus weldoni Evans, 1901

Species of basal Peripatid velvet worm

Eoperipatus weldoni is a species of velvet worm in the Peripatidae family. This velvet worm is dark brown with pale spots and a darker line running down the middle of its back. The ventral surface is yellowish grey with small spots of brown. This species has 23 to 25 pairs of legs and can reach 65 mm in length, but the average specimen is 58 mm in length. The type locality is in West Malaysia.
