= Epiperipatus lucerna =

Scientific classification
- Kingdom: Animalia
- Phylum: Onychophora
- Family: Peripatidae
- Genus: Epiperipatus
- Species: E. lucerna

Binomial name
- Epiperipatus lucerna Costa, Chagas & Pinto-da-Rocha, 2018

Species of velvet worm

Epiperipatus lucerna is a species of velvet worm in the family Peripatidae. The males of this species have 27 to 29 pairs of legs; females have 29 to 31 pairs. The type locality is in Alagoas state in Brazil.
