= Julian Monge Najera =

Costa Rican ecologist

Julián Monge-Nájera
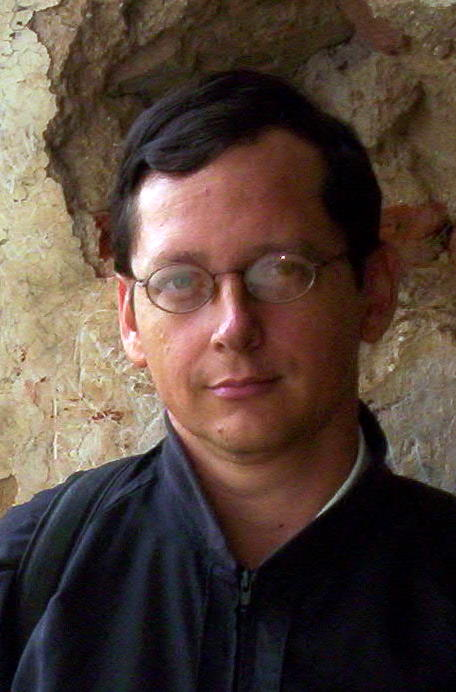
- Monge Nájera in 2005
- Born: 6 June 1960 (age 66); San José, Costa Rica
- Education: Universidad de Costa Rica
- Known for: Scientific Adviser to the BBC (Sir David Attemborough's Trials of Life and Life in the Undergrowth) and the National Geographic Society, Member, Biogeography Society, Paris, Director University of Costa Rica Press.
- Scientific career
- Fields: Ecologist, Evolutionary biology, History of Science, Distance Education, Art Photography

Julián Monge-Nájera (born June 6, 1960) is a Costa Rican ecologist, scientific editor, educator and photographer. He has done research with the following institutions: Universidad de Costa Rica, Smithsonian Tropical Research Institute, and Universidad Estatal a Distancia. His scientific work has been featured by The New York Times; National Geographic; the BBC; Wired; IFLoveScience; The Independent (London) and Reader's Digest, among others. He is a member of the expert panel that sets the environmental Doomsday Clock; Onychophora curator in the Encyclopedia of Life; and team member of the IUCN Red List of Threatened Species.

== Scientific career ==
Monge-Nájera was the Editor of Revista de Biología Tropical/International Journal of Tropical Biology and Conservation for more than 30 years, but simultaneously published nearly 200 scientific articles and more than 20 books on a variety of biological topics and other areas.

=== Early work: mollusks and insects ===
Early research focused on tropical freshwater turtles but soon Monge-Nájera moved to freshwater snails (Physidae). He described the vertical movements of the snails in the water column, embryo development and the presence of internal trematode parasites and of oligochaete worms on the snails' body surface. His study of invertebrate ecology always centered on the evolutionary origin of adaptations that allowed mollusks, velvet worms, and insects to inhabit particular places. After his early study of freshwater snails, he turned to terrestrial snails and how they could become agricultural pests after their original forests habitats, where they were rare, were cut down. Monge-Nájera's book on how to control terrestrial and aquatic mollusks of agricultural and medical importance has long been the only one available for tropical species. He published a detailed study on Hamadryas butterflies that analyzed their use of trees as territories and the why and how of sound production. This study solved some questions that had been made but left unanswered by Charles Darwin in his Journal of Researches and in The Descent of Man and Selection in Relation to Sex. His discoveries with butterflies were mentioned in National Geographic Magazine and The Reader's Digest With several colleagues he summarized previous knowledge on sound production by butterflies and described the basic ecology and field behavior of several species. With H.F. Swanson, he reported that daily records of the Red Admiral butterfly (Vanessa atalanta) taken for more than 8000 consecutive days identified demographic patterns that can be missed in studies with less detailed observations. In a copublication with I. Hedström, Monge-Nájera also found that larger fruit flies, which appear to have more sexual partners, are more frequently infected by sexually transmitted fungi. With Ramírez and Chavarría, he found that fig wasps follow simple rules instead of complex calculations when defining the sex of offspring. His work with Z. Barrientos found that even though the individual species change, the guild distribution within insect communities is similar among highland paramos of several countries, paralleling a phenomenon previously recorded in marine islands.

=== Living fossils and biogeography ===
In the decade of 1990 he published several works on the behavior, ecology and biogeography of velvet worms (Onychophora), a rare type of "living fossil". His studies included extant onychophorans and fossil species that lived in marine Cambrian communities. These studies were mainly coauthored with B.Morera and Hou Xianguang. Monge-Nájera is among those scientists who do not believe in a "Cambrian Explosion" and he published an ecological reconstruction of a Chinese Cambrian community that was surprisingly similar to extant shore communities. His 1995 work set more than a century of disconnected findings inside an evolutionary framework that explained the possible origin of the basic physiological, morphological and behavioral characteristics of the Onychophora, and also produced the first phylogeny that included both extinct and extant species. Contemporary work included some of the earliest experimental studies using these animals and identified the range of light frequencies that they can see. He also produced two reviews that summarized the advances and limitations of historical and ecological biogeography.

=== Urban ecology and air pollution ===
As a researcher of the Urban Ecology Laboratory at UNED (Costa Rica), Monge-Nájera has studied air pollution, long term vegetation change in cities, urban corridors and landscape quantification. Using tree trunk lichens as bioindicators, he reported that air pollution decreased after lead was eliminated from gasoline, explaining how topography and wind patterns disperse pollution in predictable routes and developed a new technique that reduces costs in pollution monitoring programs; the method allows citizens (including school children) to identify health risks in their communities. His long term vegetation change study found that after a century, habitat conditions can actually improve thanks to bioalphabetization, and identified changes in the dangers faced by Roman ruins. He also proposed detailed routes for urban corridors to improve cities for plants and animals that live in them, and was among the first ecologists to recognize that road mortality caused by vehicles is much higher among insects and other invertebrates than among mammals. With Zaidett Barrientos he developed a quantitative method for landscape analysis that complements remote sensors at a very low cost and allows quantitative measures of changes through time, and published a route map for ecological restoration of the central region of Costa Rica.

=== Chloroplasts, epiphyllous plants and bromeliads ===
Botanical research by Monge-Nájera has focussed on two areas, the evolution of chloroplasts and the ecology of plants that grow on other plants. As part of an international team led by USDA's K.C. Vaughn, he found that the anthocerote chloroplast is unique among the embryophytes and can be used in taxonomy at the generic level. Experiments with artificial leaves answered the old question of whether epiphyllous plants extract nutrients from their host and found that driptips kept leaves dry enough for epiphyllous plants to develop. He also tested a long-standing hypothesis about epiphyte distribution matching the Holdridge Life Zone System, and found that the correlation is poor. At the 100th anniversary of Picado's theoretical model of bromeliad colonization, he measured experimentally the effect of rain and fallen debris on macroinvertebrates that reached artificial water tanks in a forest.

=== Ethics and online education ===
In the decade of 1990 Monge-Nájera produced several articles on the use of computers and Internet for distance education, which was in its early stage at the time. On a more philosophical line, he also published on the ethics of education and science in the times of Internet, and on the need to include people with disabilities when designing website and other products. He has published on the relationship between scientists working in rich and poor countries, insisting on the view that cooperation and quality research under more egalitarian conditions are needed among researchers.

=== Vertebrate evolution and ecology ===
Monge-Nájera's studies with vertebrates asked similar questions to those he studied in invertebrates (what characteristics allow a species to live in a particular habitat, and how those characteristics evolved), but were done with turtles, snakes, birds and mammals. The study of the semiaquatic turtle Rhinoclemmys pulcherrima described behavioral adaptations to their moist habitat, and the redescription of the venomous snake Bothriechis supraciliaris included a morphometric study of geographic variation in related snakes. The question of why brown quetzal feathers are perceived as green by the human eye also considered how such adaptation can work in the moist ecosystems inhabited by these birds. Even though his work with birds was minimal, he edited and coauthored a book about how birds and other organisms might have participated in the development of music, Music Origins. Gastric bacteria in mammals were the basis for a cladogram of how the bacteria could have evolved. Why coyotes could expand their geographic range in the last centuries rejected the hypothesis that it was caused by deforestation.

=== Human biology and sociobiology ===
After 2001, he started to publish on how humans interact with the environment, both from the point of view of human biology and urban ecology; in human biology mainly about the sociobiology of human sexuality in relation with sex work in Costa Rica. The published studies on sexuality have detailed censorship, and working conditions of prostitutes and how they are presented by the media. Later research also deals with human intimate behavior, and self-presentation of their personalities by glamour models. He also studied work-related diseases and how social interactions affect health self-care.

=== Conservation, TV show and art ===
He wrote several textbooks used in Latin American colleges and high schools, including some on tropical natural history, ecology, general biology and one on sustainable development that is considered a landmark for its extensive use of cartoons. From the beginning of his career, Monge-Nájera included conservation in his work. His book with Z. Barrientos was meant to be a handbook for tourists who could feel disappointed by not seeing the jaguars and quetzals of travel ads: if they could understand the amazing stories behind the simplest bugs and leaves; their key idea: they would never get disappointed. In his 1994 anthology he defended the view that people from poor villages perceived conservation very differently from the powerful people in governments and NGOs and insisted that their voice be heard before policies were implemented. For many years he had a TV show about scientific rights and wrongs in movies in the official television channel of the University of Costa Rica. As a nature artist he illustrated several books for the Costa Rican Distance University and as a photographer his work was published in books by several Costa Rican publishers and by Fauna Magazine (New York). His website Tropinature includes several galleries of free-to-reproduce nature photographs as well as portraits and figure.

== Scientific controversies ==
His article on how Costa Ricans began to reach higher positions in the Organization for Tropical Studies was controversial, and follow up articles were published against his view and in support of his statements.

== Selected bibliography ==
- Monge-Nájera, J. 1990. Introducción al estudio de la naturaleza. una visión desde el trópico. EUNED, San José, Costa Rica.
- Monge-Nájera, J. & Z. Barrientos. 1995. Costa Rican biodiversity. Readings for ecotourists. INBio, Heredia, Costa Rica.
  Monge-Nájera, J. 1997.
- Molluscs of economic and sanitary importance in the Tropics: the Costa Rican experience. EUCR, San José, Costa Rica.
- Monge-Nájera, J. 1992. Clicking Butterflies, Hamadryas, of Panamá: Their biology and identification (Lepidoptera: Nymphalidae). p. 567-572. In D. Quintero & A. Aiello (eds.). Insects of Panama and Mesoamerica: Selected Studies. Oxford University Press, Oxford, England.
- Monge-Nájera, J. 2000. Onychophora, p. 105-114. In J. Llorente, E. González & N. Papavero (eds.). Biodiversidad, taxonomía y biogeografía de artrópodos de México: hacia una síntesis de su conocimiento, vol. II. UNAM, México, D.F., Mexico.
- Aguilar A., M. & J. Monge-Nájera. 2004. Evolución tecnológica de los laboratorios virtuales en la Universidad Estatal a Distancia, p. 143-151. In M. Mena (comp.). La educación a distancia en América Latina. Modelos, tecnologías y realidades. International Council for Open and Distance Education, UNESCO y La Crujía, Buenos Aires, Argentina.
