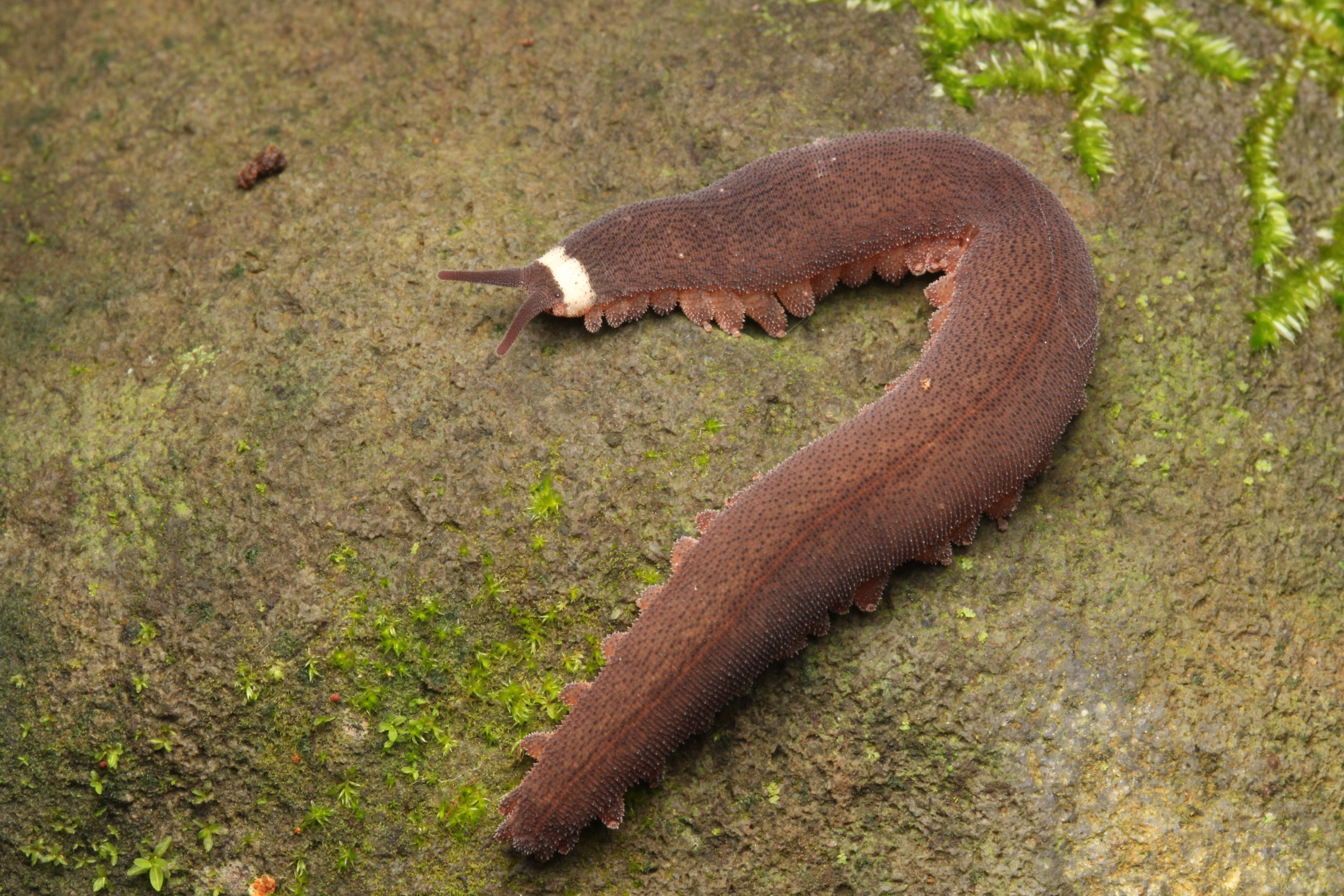

Scientific classification
- Kingdom: Animalia
- Phylum: Onychophora
- Family: Peripatidae; Audouin & Milne-Edwards, 1832

Genera
- See text
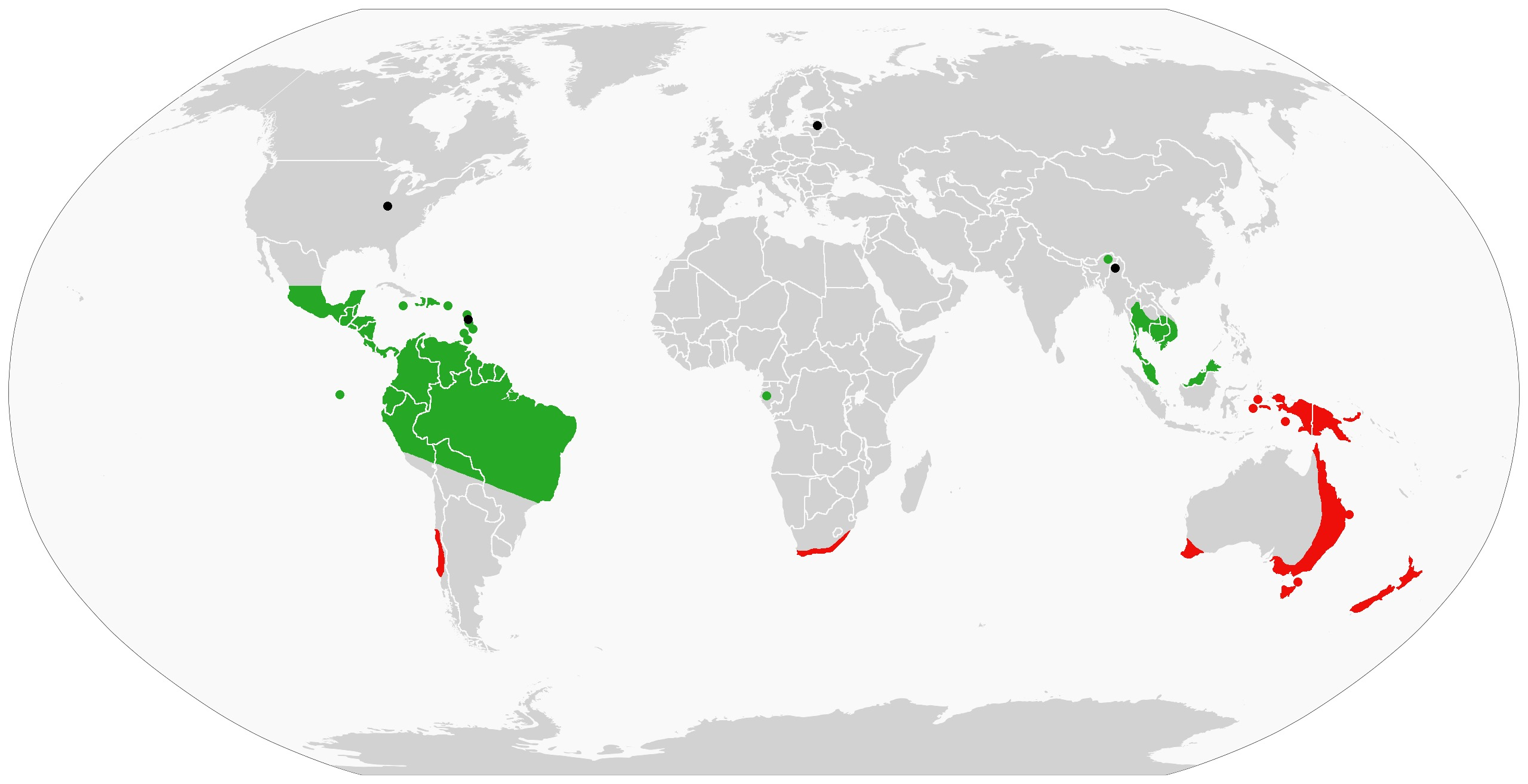
- Global range of Onychophora extant Peripatidae Peripatopsidae fossils

= Peripatidae =

Peripatidae Temporal range: 100–0 Ma

Family of invertebrate animals

The Peripatidae or Equatorial velvet worms are a family of velvet worms. This family includes more than 90 described species distributed among 13 genera, but some authorities deem only 80 of these species to be valid. The oldest putative representatives of the family herald from Burmese amber dated to the mid-Cretaceous, around 100 million years ago, with representatives from Dominican and Baltic amber attesting to a broader distribution in the Palaeogene / Neogene; molecular variability suggests that the family's crown group may have arisen in the early Mesozoic.

== Description ==
The Peripatidae exhibit a range of derivative features. They are longer, on average, than the Peripatopsidae and also have more leg pairs. The number of legs in the Peripatidae varies within species as well as among species and ranges from 19 pairs (in Typhloperipatus williamsoni and Speleoperipatus spelaeus) to 43 pairs (in Plicatoperipatus jamaicensis). The gonopore is always between the penultimate leg pair. There are no known oviparous species—the overwhelming majority, including all the Neotropical Peripatidae, are viviparous with females that develop a placenta to provide the growing embryo with nutrients. The Asian genera Typhloperipatus and Eoperipatus, however, exhibit lecithotrophic ovoviviparity; that is, their females do not develop any placenta and instead retain yolky eggs in their uteri to supply nourishment.

== Distribution and habitat ==
The Peripatidae, also known as equatorial velvet worms, are restricted to the tropical and subtropical zones; in particular, they inhabit Central America, the Caribbean, northern South America, Gabon, Northeast India, and Southeast Asia.

== Classification ==
=== Phylogeny ===
Below is a combined genus-level phylogeny of both extant and extinct peripatid velvet worms.

- Peripatidae
  - - Eoperipatus
    - - Typhloperipatus
      - †Cretoperipatus
  - - Mesoperipatus
    - Neopatida

==== Neopatida ====
Neopatida is a monophyletic lineage within the Peripatidae, comprising all peripatids except the few found outside of the Americas. As seen above, many genera in Neopatida are paraphyletic or even polyphyletic.

=== Genera ===
The family consists of the following genera:

- Cerradopatus Oliveira et al., 2015
- † Cretoperipatus Engel & Grimaldi, 2002
- Eoperipatus Evans, 1901
- Epiperipatus Clark, 1913
- Heteroperipatus Zilch, 1954
- Macroperipatus Clark, 1913
- Mesoperipatus Evans, 1901
- Mongeperipatus Barquero-González et al., 2020
- Oroperipatus Cockerell, 1908
- Peripatus Guilding, 1826
- Plicatoperipatus Clark, 1913
- Principapillatus Oliveira et al., 2013
- Speleoperipatus Peck, 1975
- Typhloperipatus Kemp, 1913
