= List of Histeridae genera =

These 418 genera belong to the family Histeridae, clown beetles. There are at least 4,800 described species in Histeridae.

== Histeridae genera ==
- Abaeletes Cooman, 1940
- Abraeomorphus Reitter, 1886
- Abraeus Leach, 1817
- Acritodes Cooman, 1935
- Acritomorphus Wenzel, 1944
- Acritus J. L. LeConte, 1853
- Acrolister Bickhardt, 1917
- Adelopygus Desbordes, 1917
- Aeletes Horn, 1873
- Aeletodes Gomy, 1977
- Aemulister Reichensperger, 1938
- Africanister Gomy, 2010
- Afrohister Mazur, 2006
- Afroprinus Lackner, 2013
- Afrosaprinus Vienna, 2015
- Afrosoma Mazur, 1999
- Alienister Reichensperger, 1926
- Alienocacculus Kanaar, 2008
- Alienodites Tishechkin, 2007
- Alloiodites Reichensperger, 1939
- Althanus Lewis, 1903
- Amiculus Dégallier & Bello, 2008
- Ammostyphrus Reichardt, 1924
- Amplectister Caterino & Maddison, 2018
- Anaglymma Lewis, 1894
- Anapleus Horn, 1873
- Anasynodites Reichensperger, 1935
- Aneuterapus Reichensperger, 1958
- Anophtaeletes Olexa, 1976
- Antongilus Gomy, 1969
- Aphanister Reichensperger, 1933
- Aphelosternus Wenzel in Arnett, 1962
- Apobletes Marseul, 1861
- Apobletodes Desbordes, 1918
- Arbolister Mazur, 1990
- Aristomorphus Lewis, 1913
- Aristonister Dégallier, 1998
- Aritaerius Kovarik & Tishechkin, 2004
- Arizonacritus Gomy & Warner, 2013
- Asiaster Cooman, 1948
- Asolenus Lewis, 1906
- Aspidolister Bickhardt, 1920
- Asterix Mazur, 1993
- Atholus C. Thomson, 1859
- Athomalus Mazur, 1993
- Atribalus Bickhardt, 1921
- Attalister Bruch, 1937
- Aulacosternus Marseul, 1853
- Australanius Gomy, 2009
- Australomalus Mazur, 1981
- Australopachylopus
- Axelinus Kryzhanovskij, 1976
- Bacaniomorphus Mazur, 1989
- Bacanius J. L. LeConte, 1853
- Baconia Lewis, 1885
- Baeckmanniolus Reichardt, 1926
- Baekmanniolus
- Barbarus Mazur, 2005
- Bastactister Reichensperger, 1939
- Blypotehus Vienna, 2000
- Brasilister Dégallier, 1999
- Bruchodites Tishechkin, 2007
- Cachexia Lewis, 1888
- Caenolister Bickhardt, 1921
- Caerosternus J. L. LeConte, 1852
- Campylorhabdus Schmidt, 1889
- Canarinus Mazur, 1993
- Carcinops Marseul, 1855
- Catacraerus Bickhardt, 1920
- Caterino
- Ceratohister Reichensperger, 1924
- Chaetabraeus Portevin, 1929
- Chaetobacanius Gomy, 1977
- Chalcionellus Reichardt, 1932
- Chalcurgus H.Kolbe, 1897
- Chapischema Caterino & Tishechkin, 2014
- Cheilister Reichensperger, 1924
- Chelonarhister Dégallier, 2004
- Chelonosternus Bickhardt, 1909
- Chelyocephalus Schmidt, 1893
- Chelyoxenus Hubbard, 1894
- Chivaenius Olexa, 1980
- Chlamydonia Caterino, 2006
- Chlamydopsis Westwood, 1869
- Chrysetaerius Reichensperger, 1923
- Clientister Reichensperger, 1935
- Coelister Bickhardt, 1917
- Coelocraera Marseul, 1857
- Colonides Schmidt, 1889
- Conchita Mazur, 1994
- Conocassis Caterino & Tishechkin, 2014
- Contipus Marseul, 1854
- Convivister Reichensperger, 1936
- Coomanister Kryzhanovskij, 1972
- Coproxenus Lewis, 1897
- Coptosternus Lewis, 1914
- Coptotrophis Lewis, 1902
- Corticalinus Gomy, 2004
- Cossyphodister Reichensperger, 1936
- Crenulister Caterino & Tishechkin, 2014
- Cretonthophilus Caterino, Wolf-Schwenninger & Bechly, 2015
- Cryptomalus Mazur, 1993
- Ctenophilothis Kryzhanovskij, 1987
- Cyclechinus Bickhardt, 1917
- Cyclobacanius G.Müller, 1925
- Cylindrolister Bickhardt, 1921
- Cylister Cooman, 1941
- Cylistosoma Lewis, 1905
- Cypturus Erichson, 1834
- Dahlgrenius Penati & Vienna, 1996
- Daitrosister Helava, 1985
- Daptesister Helava, 1985
- Degallierister Gomy, 2001
- Dendrophilus Leach, 1817
- Desbordesia Mazur, 1999
- Diabletes Reichardt, 1933
- Diister Mazur, 1989
- Dimalus Marseul, 1870
- Diplostix Bickhardt, 1921
- Discoscelis Schmidt, 1889
- Dolicholister Bickhardt, 1917
- Eblisia Lewis, 1889
- Ebonius Lewis, 1885
- Ecclisister Reichensperger, 1935
- Ectatommiphila Lea, 1914
- Enicosoma Lewis, 1904
- Enkyosoma Caterino & Tishechkin, 2014
- Eopachylopus Reichardt, 1926
- Eosaprinus Kozminykh, 2000
- Epiechinus Lewis, 1891
- Epierus Erichson, 1834
- Epiglyptus Lewis, 1906
- Epitoxasia Cooman, 1932
- Epitoxus Lewis, 1900
- Epuraeosoma Slipinski & Mazur, 1999
- Erebidus Reichardt, 1941
- Eremosaprinus Ross, 1939
- Eretmotus Lacordaire, 1854
- Errabundus Mazur, 2006
- Eubrachium Wollaston, 1862
- Euclasea Lewis, 1888
- Eucurtia Mjöberg, 1912
- Eucurtiopsis Silvestri, 1926
- Eudiplister Reitter, 1909
- Eugrammicus Lewis, 1907
- Eulomalus Cooman, 1937
- Eurosoma Mazur & Ôhara, 2009
- Eurylister Bickhardt, 1920
- Eurysister Helava, 1985
- Euspilotus Lewis, 1907
- Eutidium Lewis, 1903
- Eutriptus Wollaston, 1862
- Euxenister Reichensperger, 1923
- Exaesiopus Reichardt, 1926
- Exorhabdus Lewis, 1910
- Exosternus Lewis, 1902
- Exotoxus Mazur, 1991
- Fistulaster Helava, 1985
- Geminorhabdus Mazur, 2007
- Geocolus Wenzel, 1944
- Geomysaprinus Ross, 1940
- Ghanister Mazur, 2005
- Globodiplostix Vienna & Yélamos, 2006
- Glymma Marseul, 1856
- Glyptosister Helava, 1985
- Gnathoncus Jacquelin-Duval, 1858
- Gomyopsis Dégallier, 1984
- Gomyoscelis Dégallier, 2001
- Gomyster Mazur, 1984
- Grammopeplus Bickhardt, 1911
- Guianahister Tishechkin, 2007
- Haeterius Dejean, 1833
- Halacritus Schmidt, 1893
- Helavadites Tishechkin, 2007
- Hemicolonides Reichensperger, 1939
- Hemisaprinus Kryzhanovskij, 1976
- Hesperodromus Schmidt, 1889
- Hetaeriobius Reichensperger, 1925
- Hetaeriodes Schmidt, 1893
- Hetaeriomorphus Schmidt, 1893
- Heudister Cooman, 1940
- Hindophelister Mazur, 1975
- Hippeutister Reichensperger, 1935
- Hister Linnaeus, 1758
- Hololepta Paykull, 1811 (clown beetles)
- Homalopygus Boheman, 1858
- Hubenthalia Bickhardt, 1918
- Hypobletus Schmidt, 1896
- Hypocacculus Bickhardt, 1914
- Hypocaccus C. Thomson, 1867
- Iarina Yélamos, 1996
- Iberacritus Yélamos, 1994
- Idister Marseul, 1880
- Idolia Lewis, 1885
- Iliotona Carnochan, 1917
- Indodiplostix Vienna, 2007
- Iridoprinus
- Iugulister Reichensperger, 1958
- Juliettinus Gomy, 2010
- Kanaarister Mazur, 1999
- Kanakopsis Caterino, 2006
- Kaszabister Mazur, 1972
- Kissister Marseul, 1862
- Kleptisister Helava, 1985
- Lacrimorpha Caterino & Tishechkin, 2014
- Latinolister Mazur, 1999
- Latronister Reichensperger, 1932
- Leptosister Helava, 1985
- Lewisister Bickhardt, 1912
- Liopygus Lewis, 1891
- Lissosternus Lewis, 1905
- Macrosternus Marseul, 1853
- Malagasyprinus Lackner & Gomy, 2013
- Margarinotus Marseul, 1853
- Mascarenium Gomy, 1978
- Mecistostethus Marseul, 1870
- Megagnathos Penati & Zhang, 2009
- Megalocraerus Lewis, 1902
- Mendelius Lewis, 1908
- Merohister Reitter, 1909
- Mesostrix Mazur, 1994
- Mesynodites Reichardt, 1924
- Metasynodites Reichensperger, 1930
- Microlister Lewis, 1905
- Microsaprinus Kryzhanovskij, 1976
- Microsynodites Tishechkin, 2007
- Monachister Mazur, 1991
- Monoplius Lacordaire, 1854
- Monotonodites Reichensperger, 1939
- Morphetaerius Reichensperger, 1939
- Mullerister Cooman, 1936
- Murexus Lewis, 1907
- Mutodites Tishechkin, 2007
- Myrmetes Marseul, 1862
- Nagelius Lewis, 1909
- Nannolepidius Reichardt, 1932
- Nasaltus Mazur & Wegrzynowicz, 2008
- Neobacanius G.Müller, 1925
- Neocolonides Dégallier, 1998
- Neohister Desbordes, 1928
- Neopachylopus Reichardt, 1926
- Neosantalus Kryzhanovskij, 1972
- Neoterapus Dégallier, 2004
- Nevermannister Reichensperger, 1938
- Nicolasites Tishechkin, 2007
- Nicotikis Marseul, 1883
- Niponius Lewis, 1885
- Niposoma Mazur, 1999
- Nipponius
- Nomadister Borgmeier, 1948
- Notocoelis Lewis, 1900
- Notodoma Lacordaire, 1854
- Notolister Lewis, 1894
- Notosaprinus Kryzhanovskij, 1972
- Nunbergia Mazur, 1978
- Nymphister Reichensperger, 1933
- Omalodes Erichson, 1834
- Omotropis Reichardt, 1933
- Onthophilus Leach, 1817
- Opadosister Helava, 1985
- Operclipygus Marseul, 1870
- Orateon Lackner & Ratto, 2014
- Orectoscelis Lewis, 1903
- Oxysternus Dejean, 1833
- Pachycraerus Marseul, 1854
- Pachylister Lewis, 1904
- Pachylomalus Schmidt, 1897
- Pachylopus Erichson, 1834
- Pacifister Mazur & Ôhara, 2009
- Pactolinus Motschulsky, 1859
- Panoplitellus Hedicke, 1923
- Papuopsis Caterino & Dégallier, 2007
- Parabraeus Müller, 1944
- Parahypocaccus Vienna, 1995
- Paramyrmetes Bruch, 1929
- Paraphilothis Vienna, 1994
- Parasynodites Bruch, 1930
- Paratropinus Reichensperger, 1923
- Paratropus Gerstaecker, 1867
- Paravolvulus Reichardt, 1932
- Parepierus Bickhardt, 1913
- Parodites Reichensperger, 1923
- Paroecister Reichensperger, 1923
- Paromalus Erichson, 1834
- Pelatetister Reichensperger, 1939
- Pelorurus Lacordaire, 1854
- Peploglyptus J. L. LeConte, 1880
- Perfidolenus Vienna, 2000
- Petalosoma Lewis, 1903
- Pheidoliphila Lea, 1914
- Phelister Marseul, 1853
- Philothis Reichardt, 1930
- Philoxenus Mazur, 1991
- Phloeolister Bickhardt, 1916
- Pholioxenus Reichardt, 1932
- Phoxonotus Marseul, 1862
- Pilisaprinus Kanaar, 1996
- Pinaxister Reichensperger, 1939
- Placodes Erichson, 1834
- Placodister Bickhardt, 1918
- Plaesius Erichson, 1834
- Plagiogramma Tarsia in Curia, 1935
- Plagioscelis Bickhardt, 1917
- Platybletes Thérond, 1952
- Platylister Lewis, 1892
- Platylomalus Cooman, 1948
- Platysoma Leach, 1817
- Platysomatinus Mazur, 1972
- Plaumannister Reichensperger, 1958
- Plegaderus Erichson, 1834
- Pleuroleptus G.Müller, 1937
- Pluricosta Caterino & Tishechkin, 2014
- Probolosternus Lewis, 1900
- Procolonides Reichensperger, 1935
- Procoryphaeus Mazur, 1984
- Psalidister Reichensperger, 1924
- Pselaphister Bruch, 1926
- Pseudepierus Casey, 1916
- Pseudister Bickhardt, 1917
- Psiloscelis Marseul, 1853
- Pterotister Reichensperger, 1939
- Pulvinister Reichensperger, 1933
- Pygocoelis Lewis, 1897
- Pyxister Caterino & Tishechkin, 2014
- Quasimodopsis Caterino & Dégallier, 2007
- Quassarus Mazur, 2007
- Reichardtia Wenzel, 1944
- Reichardtiolus Kryzhanovskij, 1959
- Reichenspergerites Tishechkin, 2007
- Renclasea Tishechkin & Caterino, 2009
- Reninoides Helava, 1985
- Reninopsis Helava, 1985
- Reninus Lewis, 1889
- Rhypochares Marseul, 1854
- Sabahister Gomy & Vienna, 2008
- Santalus Lewis, 1906
- Saprinillus Kryzhanovskij, 1974
- Saprinodes Lewis, 1891
- Saprinus Erichson, 1834
- Sarandibrinus Lackner & Gomy, 2014
- Sardulus Patrizi, 1955
- Satrapes Schmidt, 1885
- Satrapister Bickhardt, 1912
- Scaphidister Cooman, 1933
- Scapicoelis Marseul, 1862
- Scapolister Borgmeier, 1930
- Scapomegas Lacordaire, 1854
- Scaptorus Caterino & Tishechkin, 2014
- Sculptura Thérond, 1969
- Seitzister Cooman, 1948
- Sibelia Mazur & Ôhara, 2009
- Sigillum Thérond, 1975
- Silinus Lewis, 1907
- Sitalia Lewis, 1900
- Spathochus Marseul, 1864
- Spelaeabraeus Moro, 1957
- Spelaeacritus Jeannel, 1934
- Sphaericosoma Marseul, 1868
- Sphyracus Marseul, 1854
- Spilodiscus Lewis, 1906
- Sternocoelis Lewis, 1888
- Sternocoelopsis Reichensperger, 1923
- Sternoglyphus Desbordes, 1916
- Stictostix Marseul, 1870
- Strigister Caterino, Tishechkin & Proudfoot, 2013
- Styphrus Motschulsky, 1845
- Sunilis Mazur & Ôhara, 2009
- Symphilister Reichensperger, 1923
- Synetister Reichensperger, 1924
- Synoditinus Reichensperger, 1929
- Synoditulus Reichensperger, 1924
- Teinotarsus Marseul, 1864
- Terametopon Vienna, 1987
- Terapus Marseul, 1862
- Teratolister Bruch, 1930
- Teratosoma Lewis, 1885
- Teretriopsis Caterino & Dégallier, 2007
- Teretriosoma Horn, 1873
- Teretrius Erichson, 1834
- Termitolister Bruch, 1930
- Termitoxenus Schmidt, 1889
- Thaumataerius Mann, 1923
- Therondus Gomy, 1974
- Thoraxister Desbordes, 1922
- Tineatrix Mazur, 2006
- Tomogenius Marseul, 1862
- Tribalasia Cooman, 1941
- Triballodes Schmidt, 1885
- Tribalus Erichson, 1834
- Trichoreninus Lewis, 1891
- Troglobacanius Vomero, 1974
- Troglosternus Bickhardt, 1917
- Trypanaeus Eschscholtz, 1829
- Trypeticus Marseul, 1864
- Trypobius Schmidt, 1893
- Trypolister Bickhardt, 1916
- Tubulister Borgmeier, 1948
- Turanostyphrus Tishechkin, 2005
- Tylois Marseul, 1864
- Ulkeopsis Helava, 1985
- Ulkeus Horn, 1885
- Voratister Helava, 1989
- Vuattouxinus Thérond, 1964
- Vuattuoxinus Thérond, 1964
- Wasmannister Bruch, 1929
- Xenister Borgmeier, 1929
- Xenonychus Wollaston, 1864
- Xenophilothis Kryzhanovskij, 1987
- Xenosternus Bickhardt, 1911
- Xerosaprinus Wenzel in Arnett, 1962
- Xestipyge Marseul, 1862
- Xiphonotus Lacordaire, 1854
- Xylonaeus Lewis, 1902
- Yarmister Wenzel, 1939
- Zabromorphus Lewis, 1906
- Zorius Reichardt, 1932
- † Pantostictus Poinar & Brown, 2009
- † Theropatina Mazur, 1984
