= List of Histerinae genera =

These 144 genera belong to Histerinae, a subfamily of clown beetles in the family Histeridae. There are at least 2,000 described species in Histerinae.

== Histerinae genera ==
Tribe Exosternini Bickhardt, 1914
Acrolister Bickhardt, 1917
Adelopygus Desbordes, 1917
Anaglymma Lewis, 1894
Apobletodes Desbordes, 1918
Arbolister Mazur, 1990
Aspidolister Bickhardt, 1920
Asterix Mazur, 1993
Baconia Lewis, 1885
Caenolister Bickhardt, 1921
Canarinus Mazur, 1993
Catacraerus Bickhardt, 1920
Chalcurgus H. Kolbe, 1897
Chapischema Caterino & Tishechkin, 2014
Coelocraera Marseul, 1857
Conchita Mazur, 1994
Conocassis Caterino & Tishechkin, 2014
Coproxenus Lewis, 1897
Corticalinus Gomy, 2004
Crenulister Caterino & Tishechkin, 2014
Cylindrolister Bickhardt, 1921
Cylistosoma Lewis, 1905
Cypturus Erichson, 1834
Diabletes Reichardt, 1933
Dolicholister Bickhardt, 1917
Enkyosoma Caterino & Tishechkin, 2014
Epitoxasia Cooman, 1932
Epitoxus Lewis, 1900
Exosternus Lewis, 1902
Exotoxus Mazur, 1991
Grammopeplus Bickhardt, 1911
Heudister Cooman, 1940
Hindophelister Mazur, 1975
Hypobletus Schmidt, 1896
Iarina Yélamos, 1996
Kaszabister Mazur, 1972
Lacrimorpha Caterino & Tishechkin, 2014
Macrosternus Marseul, 1853
Mecistostethus Marseul, 1870
Monoplius Lacordaire, 1854
Notodoma Lacordaire, 1854
Nunbergia Mazur, 1978
Operclipygus Marseul, 1870
Pachycraerus Marseul, 1853
Paratropus Gerstaecker, 1867
Pelorurus Lacordaire, 1854
Phelister Marseul, 1853
Platybletes Thérond, 1952
Platysomatinus Mazur, 1972
Pluricosta Caterino & Tishechkin, 2014
Probolosternus Lewis, 1900
Procoryphaeus Mazur, 1984
Pseudister Bickhardt, 1917
Pyxister Caterino & Tishechkin, 2014
Sabahister Gomy & Vienna, 2008
Scaptorus Caterino & Tishechkin, 2014
Sitalia Lewis, 1900
Spathochus Marseul, 1864
Strigister Caterino, Tishechkin & Proudfoot, 2013
Thoraxister Desbordes, 1922
Xenosternus Bickhardt, 1911
Yarmister Wenzel, 1939
Tribe Histerini Gyllenhal, 1808
Afrohister Mazur, 2006
Asiaster Cooman, 1948
Atholus C. Thomson, 1859
Barbarus Mazur, 2005
Campylorhabdus Schmidt, 1889
Contipus Marseul, 1854
Coptosternus Lewis, 1914
Epiglyptus Lewis, 1906
Errabundus Mazur, 2006
Eudiplister Reitter, 1909
Eugrammicus Lewis, 1907
Exorhabdus Lewis, 1910
Geminorhabdus Mazur, 2007
Ghanister Mazur, 2005
Hister Linnaeus, 1758
Hubenthalia Bickhardt, 1918
Margarinotus Marseul, 1853
Megalocraerus Lewis, 1902
Merohister Reitter, 1909
Nagelius Lewis, 1909
Nasaltus Mazur & Wegrzynowicz, 2008
Neohister Desbordes, 1928
Neosantalus Kryzhanovskij, 1972
Omotropis Reichardt, 1933
Pachylister Lewis, 1904
Pactolinus Motschulsky, 1860
Psiloscelis Marseul, 1853
Quassarus Mazur, 2007
Santalus Lewis, 1906
Seitzister Cooman, 1948
Spilodiscus Lewis, 1906
Sternoglyphus Desbordes, 1916
Teinotarsus Marseul, 1864
Tineatrix Mazur, 2006
Zabromorphus Lewis, 1906
Tribe Hololeptini Hope, 1840
Dimalus Marseul, 1870
Eutidium Lewis, 1903
Hololepta Paykull, 1811
Iliotona Carnochan, 1917
Oxysternus Erichson, 1834
Petalosoma Lewis, 1903
Tribe Omalodini Kryzhanovskij, 1972
Ebonius Lewis, 1885
Omalodes Erichson, 1834
Tribe Platysomatini Bickhardt, 1914
Afrosoma Mazur, 1999
Althanus Lewis, 1903
Apobletes Marseul, 1860
Aulacosternus Marseul, 1853
Desbordesia Mazur, 1999
Diister Mazur, 1989
Eblisia Lewis, 1889
Epuraeosoma Slipinski & Mazur, 1999
Eurosoma Mazur & Ôhara, 2009
Eurylister Bickhardt, 1920
Gomyoscelis Dégallier, 2001
Idister Marseul, 1880
Kanaarister Mazur, 1999
Latinolister Mazur, 1999
Liopygus Lewis, 1891
Megagnathos Penati & Zhang, 2009
Mendelius Lewis, 1908
Mesostrix Mazur, 1994
Microlister Lewis, 1905
Nicotikis Marseul, 1883
Niposoma Mazur, 1999
Pacifister Mazur & Ôhara, 2009
Placodes Erichson, 1834
Placodister Bickhardt, 1918
Plaesius Erichson, 1834
Platylister Lewis, 1892
Platysoma Leach, 1817
Sibelia Mazur & Ôhara, 2009
Silinus Lewis, 1907
Sunilis Mazur & Ôhara, 2009
Not placed in a tribe
Asolenus Lewis, 1906
Atribalus Bickhardt, 1921
Blypotehus Vienna, 2000
Lewisister Bickhardt, 1912
Notolister Lewis, 1894
Perfidolenus Vienna, 2000
Rhypochares Marseul, 1853
Scapomegas Lacordaire, 1854
Sphyracus Marseul, 1854
Theropatina Mazur, 1984
