= List of Baconia species =

This is a list of 115 species in Baconia, a genus of clown beetles in the family Histeridae.

== Baconia species ==
- Baconia adebratti Caterino and Tishechkin, 2013^{i c g}
- Baconia aenea Caterino and Tishechkin, 2013^{i c g}
- Baconia aeneomicans (Horn, 1873)^{i c g b}
- Baconia angulifrons Caterino and Tishechkin, 2013^{i c g}
- Baconia angusta Schmidt, 1893^{i c g}
- Baconia animata Caterino and Tishechkin, 2013^{i c g}
- Baconia anthracina Caterino and Tishechkin, 2013^{i c g}
- Baconia applanatis Caterino and Tishechkin, 2013^{i c g}
- Baconia atricolor Caterino and Tishechkin, 2013^{i c g}
- Baconia aulaea Caterino and Tishechkin, 2013^{i c g}
- Baconia azuripennis Caterino and Tishechkin, 2013^{i c g}
- Baconia barbarus (Cooman, 1934)^{i c g}
- Baconia bigemina Caterino and Tishechkin, 2013^{i c g}
- Baconia brunnea Caterino and Tishechkin, 2013^{i c g}
- Baconia bullifrons Caterino and Tishechkin, 2013^{i c g}
- Baconia burmeisteri (Marseul, 1870)^{i c g}
- Baconia carinifrons Caterino and Tishechkin, 2013^{i c g}
- Baconia castanea Caterino and Tishechkin, 2013^{i c g}
- Baconia cavei Caterino and Tishechkin, 2013^{i c g}
- Baconia cavifrons (Lewis, 1893)^{i c g}
- Baconia chatzimanolisi Caterino and Tishechkin, 2013^{i c g}
- Baconia chilense (Redtenbacher, 1867)^{i c g}
- Baconia choaspites Lewis, 1901^{i c g}
- Baconia chujoi (Cooman, 1941)^{i c g}
- Baconia clemens Caterino and Tishechkin, 2013^{i c g}
- Baconia coerulea (Bickhardt, 1917)^{i c g}
- Baconia crassa Caterino and Tishechkin, 2013^{i c g}
- Baconia cylindrica Caterino and Tishechkin, 2013^{i c g}
- Baconia deliberata Caterino and Tishechkin, 2013^{i c g}
- Baconia dentipes Caterino and Tishechkin, 2013^{i c g}
- Baconia diminua Caterino and Tishechkin, 2013^{i c g}
- Baconia disciformis Caterino and Tishechkin, 2013^{i c g}
- Baconia dives (Marseul, 1862)^{i c g}
- Baconia emarginata Caterino and Tishechkin, 2013^{i c g}
- Baconia excelsa Caterino and Tishechkin, 2013^{i c g}
- Baconia eximia (Lewis, 1888)^{i c}
- Baconia famelica Caterino and Tishechkin, 2013^{i c g}
- Baconia festiva Lewis, 1891^{i c g}
- Baconia foliosoma Caterino and Tishechkin, 2013^{i c g}
- Baconia fornix Caterino and Tishechkin, 2013^{i c g}
- Baconia fortis Caterino and Tishechkin, 2013^{i c g}
- Baconia fulgida (Schmidt, 1889)^{i c g}
- Baconia furtiva Caterino and Tishechkin, 2013^{i c g}
- Baconia gibbifer Caterino and Tishechkin, 2013^{i c g}
- Baconia glauca (Marseul, 1884)^{i c g}
- Baconia globosa Caterino and Tishechkin, 2013^{i c g}
- Baconia godmani (Lewis, 1888)^{i c}
- Baconia gounellei (Marseul, 1887)^{i c g}
- Baconia grossii Caterino and Tishechkin, 2013^{i c g}
- Baconia guartela Caterino and Tishechkin, 2013^{i c g}
- Baconia haeterioides Caterino and Tishechkin, 2013^{i c g}
- Baconia illustris (Lewis, 1900)^{i c g}
- Baconia incognita Caterino and Tishechkin, 2013^{i c g}
- Baconia insolita (Schmidt, 1893)^{i c g}
- Baconia irinae Caterino and Tishechkin, 2013^{i c g}
- Baconia isthmia Caterino and Tishechkin, 2013^{i c g}
- Baconia jacinta Caterino and Tishechkin, 2013^{i c g}
- Baconia jubaris Lewis, 1901^{i c g}
- Baconia katieae Caterino and Tishechkin, 2013^{i c g}
- Baconia kubani Caterino and Tishechkin, 2013^{i c g}
- Baconia leivasi Caterino and Tishechkin, 2013^{i c g}
- Baconia lescheni Caterino and Tishechkin, 2013^{i c g}
- Baconia lewisi Mazur, 1984^{i c g}
- Baconia longipes Caterino and Tishechkin, 2013^{i c g}
- Baconia loricata Lewis, 1885^{i c g}
- Baconia lunatifrons Caterino and Tishechkin, 2013^{i c g}
- Baconia maculata Caterino and Tishechkin, 2013^{i c g}
- Baconia maquipucunae Caterino and Tishechkin, 2013^{i c g}
- Baconia micans (Schmidt, 1889)^{i c g}
- Baconia mustax Caterino and Tishechkin, 2013^{i c g}
- Baconia navarretei Caterino and Tishechkin, 2013^{i c g}
- Baconia nayarita Caterino and Tishechkin, 2013^{i c g}
- Baconia nebulosa Caterino and Tishechkin, 2013^{i c g}
- Baconia oblonga Caterino and Tishechkin, 2013^{i c g}
- Baconia obsoleta Caterino and Tishechkin, 2013^{i c g}
- Baconia opulenta Caterino and Tishechkin, 2013^{i c g}
- Baconia patula Lewis, 1885^{i c g}
- Baconia pernix Caterino and Tishechkin, 2013^{i c g}
- Baconia pilicauda Caterino and Tishechkin, 2013^{i c g}
- Baconia piluliformis Caterino and Tishechkin, 2013^{i c g}
- Baconia plebeia Caterino and Tishechkin, 2013^{i c g}
- Baconia prasina Caterino and Tishechkin, 2013^{i c g}
- Baconia pulchella Caterino and Tishechkin, 2013^{i c g}
- Baconia punctiventer Caterino and Tishechkin, 2013^{i c g}
- Baconia purpurata Caterino and Tishechkin, 2013^{i c g}
- Baconia quercea Caterino and Tishechkin, 2013^{i c g}
- Baconia redemptor Caterino and Tishechkin, 2013^{i c g}
- Baconia repens Caterino and Tishechkin, 2013^{i c g}
- Baconia reposita Caterino and Tishechkin, 2013^{i c g}
- Baconia riehli (Marseul, 1862)^{i c g}
- Baconia riouka (Marseul, 1861)^{i c g}
- Baconia rossi Caterino and Tishechkin, 2013^{i c g}
- Baconia rubripennis Caterino and Tishechkin, 2013^{i c g}
- Baconia rufescens Caterino and Tishechkin, 2013^{i c g}
- Baconia ruficauda Caterino and Tishechkin, 2013^{i c g}
- Baconia salobrus (Marseul, 1887)^{i c}
- Baconia sanguinea Caterino and Tishechkin, 2013^{i c g}
- Baconia sapphirina Caterino and Tishechkin, 2013^{i c g}
- Baconia scintillans Caterino and Tishechkin, 2013^{i c g}
- Baconia silvestris Caterino and Tishechkin, 2013^{i c g}
- Baconia slipinskii Mazur, 1981^{i c g}
- Baconia splendida Caterino and Tishechkin, 2013^{i c g}
- Baconia stephani Caterino and Tishechkin, 2013^{i c g}
- Baconia submetallica Caterino and Tishechkin, 2013^{i c g}
- Baconia subtilis Caterino and Tishechkin, 2013^{i c g}
- Baconia tenuipes Caterino and Tishechkin, 2013^{i c g}
- Baconia teredina Caterino and Tishechkin, 2013^{i c g}
- Baconia tuberculifer Caterino and Tishechkin, 2013^{i c g}
- Baconia turgifrons Caterino and Tishechkin, 2013^{i c g}
- Baconia varicolor (Marseul, 1887)^{i c g}
- Baconia venusta (J. E. LeConte, 1845)^{i c g b}
- Baconia violacea (Marseul, 1853)^{i c g}
- Baconia viridimicans (Schmidt, 1893)^{i c g}
- Baconia viridis Caterino and Tishechkin, 2013^{i c g}
- Baconia wallacea Caterino and Tishechkin, 2013^{i c g}

Data sources: i = ITIS, c = Catalogue of Life, g = GBIF, b = Bugguide.net
