= List of Operclipygus species =

This is a list of species of the hister beetle genus Operclipygus, of which there are currently 177

== A ==
- Operclipygus abbreviatus Caterino & Tishechkin, 2013
- Operclipygus andinus Caterino & Tishechkin, 2013
- Operclipygus angulifer Caterino & Tishechkin, 2013
- Operclipygus angustisternus (Wenzel, 1944)
- Operclipygus arnaudi Dégallier, 1982
- Operclipygus arquus Caterino & Tishechkin, 2013
- Operclipygus ashei Caterino & Tishechkin, 2013
- Operclipygus assimilis Caterino & Tishechkin, 2013
- Operclipygus atlanticus Caterino & Tishechkin, 2013

== B ==
- Operclipygus baylessae Caterino & Tishechkin, 2013
- Operclipygus belemensis Caterino & Tishechkin, 2013
- Operclipygus bickhardti Caterino & Tishechkin, 2013
- Operclipygus bicolor Caterino & Tishechkin, 2013
- Operclipygus bidessois (Marseul, 1889)
- Operclipygus bosquesecus Caterino & Tishechkin, 2013
- Operclipygus britannicus Caterino & Tishechkin, 2013
- Operclipygus brooksi Caterino & Tishechkin, 2013
- Operclipygus bulbistoma Caterino & Tishechkin, 2013

== C ==
- Operclipygus callifrons Caterino & Tishechkin, 2013
- Operclipygus campbelli Caterino & Tishechkin, 2013
- Operclipygus carinisternus Caterino & Tishechkin, 2013
- Operclipygus carinistrius (Lewis, 1908)
- Operclipygus cavisternus Caterino & Tishechkin, 2013
- Operclipygus cephalicus Caterino & Tishechkin, 2013
- Operclipygus chamelensis Caterino & Tishechkin, 2013
- Operclipygus chiapensis Caterino & Tishechkin, 2013
- Operclipygus colombicus Caterino & Tishechkin, 2013
- Operclipygus communis Caterino & Tishechkin, 2013
- Operclipygus confertus Caterino & Tishechkin, 2013
- Operclipygus confluens Caterino & Tishechkin, 2013
- Operclipygus conquisitus (Lewis, 1902)
- Operclipygus crenatus (Lewis, 1888)
- Operclipygus crenulatus Caterino & Tishechkin, 2013
- Operclipygus curtistrius Caterino & Tishechkin, 2013

== D ==
- Operclipygus dentatus Caterino & Tishechkin, 2013
- Operclipygus depressus (Hinton, 1935)
- Operclipygus diffluens Caterino & Tishechkin, 2013
- Operclipygus disconnectus Caterino & Tishechkin, 2013
- Operclipygus distinctus (Hinton, 1935)
- Operclipygus distractus (Schmidt, 1896)
- Operclipygus dubitabilis (Marseul, 1889)
- Operclipygus dubius (Lewis, 1888)
- Operclipygus dybasi Caterino & Tishechkin, 2013
- Operclipygus dytiscoides Caterino & Tishechkin, 2013

== E ==
- Operclipygus ecitonis Caterino & Tishechkin, 2013
- Operclipygus elongatus Caterino & Tishechkin, 2013
- Operclipygus extraneus Caterino & Tishechkin, 2013

== F ==
- Operclipygus falini Caterino & Tishechkin, 2013
- Operclipygus faltistrius Caterino & Tishechkin, 2013
- Operclipygus farctissimus Caterino & Tishechkin, 2013
- Operclipygus farctus (Marseul, 1864)
- Operclipygus florifauensis Caterino & Tishechkin, 2013
- Operclipygus formicatus Caterino & Tishechkin, 2013
- Operclipygus fossipygus (Wenzel, 1944)
- Operclipygus foveipygus (Bickhardt, 1918)
- Operclipygus foveiventris Caterino & Tishechkin, 2013
- Operclipygus friburgius (Marseul, 1864)
- Operclipygus fungicolus (Wenzel & Dybas, 1941)
- Operclipygus fusistrius Caterino & Tishechkin, 2013

== G ==
- Operclipygus geometricus (Casey, 1893)
- Operclipygus gibbulus (Schmidt, 1889)
- Operclipygus gilli Caterino & Tishechkin, 2013
- Operclipygus granulipectus Caterino & Tishechkin, 2013
- Operclipygus gratus Caterino & Tishechkin, 2013
- Operclipygus guianensis Caterino & Tishechkin, 2013

== H ==
- Operclipygus hamistrius (Schmidt, 1893)
- Operclipygus hintoni Caterino & Tishechkin, 2013
- Operclipygus hirsutipes Caterino & Tishechkin, 2013
- Operclipygus hospes (Lewis, 1902)

== I ==
- Operclipygus ibiscus Caterino & Tishechkin, 2013
- Operclipygus ignifer Caterino & Tishechkin, 2013
- Operclipygus iheringi (Bickhardt, 1917)
- Operclipygus impositus Caterino & Tishechkin, 2013
- Operclipygus impressicollis Caterino & Tishechkin, 2013
- Operclipygus impressifrons Caterino & Tishechkin, 2013
- Operclipygus impressistrius Caterino & Tishechkin, 2013
- Operclipygus impuncticollis (Hinton, 1935)
- Operclipygus impunctipennis (Hinton, 1935)
- Operclipygus incisus Caterino & Tishechkin, 2013
- Operclipygus inflatus Caterino & Tishechkin, 2013
- Operclipygus innocuus Caterino & Tishechkin, 2013
- Operclipygus inquilinus Caterino & Tishechkin, 2013
- Operclipygus intersectus Caterino & Tishechkin, 2013
- Operclipygus intermissus Caterino & Tishechkin, 2013
- Operclipygus itoupe Caterino & Tishechkin, 2013

== J ==
- Operclipygus juninensis Caterino & Tishechkin, 2013

== K ==
- Operclipygus kerga (Marseul, 1870)

== L ==
- Operclipygus lama Mazur, 1988
- Operclipygus latemarginatus (Bickhardt, 1920)
- Operclipygus latifoveatus Caterino & Tishechkin, 2013
- Operclipygus latipygus Caterino & Tishechkin, 2013
- Operclipygus limonensis Caterino & Tishechkin, 2013
- Operclipygus lissipygus Caterino & Tishechkin, 2013
- Operclipygus longidens Caterino & Tishechkin, 2013
- Operclipygus lucanoides Caterino & Tishechkin, 2013
- Operclipygus lunulus Caterino & Tishechkin, 2013

== M ==
- Operclipygus maesi Caterino & Tishechkin, 2013
- Operclipygus mangiferus Caterino & Tishechkin, 2013
- Operclipygus marginellus (LeConte, 1860)
- Operclipygus marginipennis Caterino & Tishechkin, 2013
- Operclipygus minutus Caterino & Tishechkin, 2013
- Operclipygus mirabilis (Wenzel & Dybas, 1941)
- Operclipygus montanus Caterino & Tishechkin, 2013
- Operclipygus mortavis Caterino & Tishechkin, 2013
- Operclipygus mutuca Caterino & Tishechkin, 2013

== N ==
- Operclipygus nicodemus Caterino & Tishechkin, 2013
- Operclipygus nitidus Caterino & Tishechkin, 2013
- Operclipygus novateutoniae Caterino & Tishechkin, 2013
- Operclipygus nubosus Caterino & Tishechkin, 2013

== O ==
- Operclipygus occultus Caterino & Tishechkin, 2013
- Operclipygus olivensis Caterino & Tishechkin, 2013
- Operclipygus orchidophilus Caterino & Tishechkin, 2013

== P ==
- Operclipygus pacificus Caterino & Tishechkin, 2013
- Operclipygus panamensis (Wenzel & Dybas, 1941)
- Operclipygus paraguensis Caterino & Tishechkin, 2013
- Operclipygus parallelus Caterino & Tishechkin, 2013
- Operclipygus parensis Caterino & Tishechkin, 2013
- Operclipygus pauperculus Caterino & Tishechkin, 2013
- Operclipygus pecki Caterino & Tishechkin, 2013
- Operclipygus peregrinus Caterino & Tishechkin, 2013
- Operclipygus perplexus Caterino & Tishechkin, 2013
- Operclipygus petrovi Caterino & Tishechkin, 2013
- Operclipygus pichinchensis Caterino & Tishechkin, 2013
- Operclipygus planifrons Caterino & Tishechkin, 2013
- Operclipygus plaumanni Caterino & Tishechkin, 2013
- Operclipygus plicatus (Hinton, 1935)
- Operclipygus plicicollis (Schmidt, 1893)
- Operclipygus praecinctus Caterino & Tishechkin, 2013
- Operclipygus profundipygus Caterino & Tishechkins, 2013
- Operclipygus prolixus Caterino & Tishechkin, 2013
- Operclipygus prominens Caterino & Tishechkin, 2013
- Operclipygus propinquus Caterino & Tishechkin, 2013
- Operclipygus proximus Caterino & Tishechkin, 2013
- Operclipygus punctatissimus Caterino & Tishechkin, 2013
- Operclipygus punctifrons Caterino & Tishechkin, 2013
- Operclipygus punctissipygus Caterino & Tishechkin, 2013
- Operclipygus punctistrius Caterino & Tishechkin, 2013
- Operclipygus pustulifer Caterino & Tishechkin, 2013
- Operclipygus punctipleurus Caterino & Tishechkin, 2013
- Operclipygus punctiventer Caterino & Tishechkin, 2013
- Operclipygus punctulatus Caterino & Tishechkin, 2013
- Operclipygus pygidialis (Lewis, 1908)

== Q ==
- Operclipygus quadratus Caterino & Tishechkin, 2013
- Operclipygus quinquestriatus Caterino & Tishechkin, 2013

== R ==
- Operclipygus remotus Caterino & Tishechkin, 2013
- Operclipygus rileyi Caterino & Tishechkin, 2013
- Operclipygus rubidus (Hinton, 1935)
- Operclipygus rufescens Caterino & Tishechkin, 2013
- Operclipygus rupicolus Caterino & Tishechkin, 2013

== S ==
- Operclipygus schlingeri Caterino & Tishechkin, 2013
- Operclipygus schmidti Caterino & Tishechkin, 2013
- Operclipygus sejunctus (Schmidt, 1896)
- Operclipygus selvorum Caterino & Tishechkin, 2013
- Operclipygus setiventris Caterino & Tishechkin, 2013
- Operclipygus shorti Caterino & Tishechkin, 2013
- Operclipygus siluriformis Caterino & Tishechkin, 2013
- Operclipygus simplicipygus Caterino & Tishechkin, 2013
- Operclipygus simplistrius Caterino & Tishechkin, 2013
- Operclipygus sinuatus Caterino & Tishechkin, 2013
- Operclipygus striatellus (Fall, 1917)
- Operclipygus subdepressus (Schmidt, 1889)
- Operclipygus subrufus Caterino & Tishechkin, 2013
- Operclipygus subsphaericus Caterino & Tishechkin, 2013
- Operclipygus subterraneus Caterino & Tishechkin, 2013
- Operclipygus subviridis Caterino & Tishechkin, 2013
- Operclipygus sulcistrius Marseul, 1870

== T ==
- Operclipygus teapensis (Marseul, 1853)
- Operclipygus tenuis Caterino & Tishechkin, 2013
- Operclipygus therondi Wenzel, 1976
- Operclipygus tiputinus Caterino & Tishechkin, 2013
- Operclipygus tripartitus Caterino & Tishechkin, 2013
- Operclipygus troglodytes Caterino & Tishechkin, 2013

== V ==
- Operclipygus validus Caterino & Tishechkin, 2013
- Operclipygus variabilis Caterino & Tishechkin, 2013
- Operclipygus vorax Caterino & Tishechkin, 2013

== W ==
- Operclipygus wenzeli Caterino & Tishechkin, 2013

== Y ==
- Operclipygus yasuni Caterino & Tishechkin, 2013
