= Platysoma gracile =

Scientific classification
- Kingdom: Animalia
- Phylum: Arthropoda
- Clade: Pancrustacea
- Class: Insecta
- Order: Coleoptera
- Suborder: Polyphaga
- Infraorder: Staphyliniformia
- Family: Histeridae
- Subfamily: Histerinae
- Tribe: Platysomatini
- Genus: Platysoma
- Species: P. gracile

Binomial name
- Platysoma gracile J. E. LeConte, 1845

Species of beetle

Platysoma gracile is a species of clown beetle in the family Histeridae. It is found in North America.
