= Eurylister carolinus =

Scientific classification
- Kingdom: Animalia
- Phylum: Arthropoda
- Class: Insecta
- Order: Coleoptera
- Suborder: Polyphaga
- Infraorder: Staphyliniformia
- Family: Histeridae
- Genus: Eurylister
- Species: E. carolinus

Binomial name
- Eurylister carolinus (Paykull, 1811)

Species of beetle

Eurylister carolinus is a species of clown beetle in the family Histeridae. It is found in North America.
