= Phelister subrotundus =

Scientific classification
- Kingdom: Animalia
- Phylum: Arthropoda
- Class: Insecta
- Order: Coleoptera
- Suborder: Polyphaga
- Infraorder: Staphyliniformia
- Family: Histeridae
- Genus: Phelister
- Species: P. subrotundus

Binomial name
- Phelister subrotundus (Say, 1825)

Species of beetle

Phelister subrotundus is a species of clown beetle in the family Histeridae. It is found in North America.
