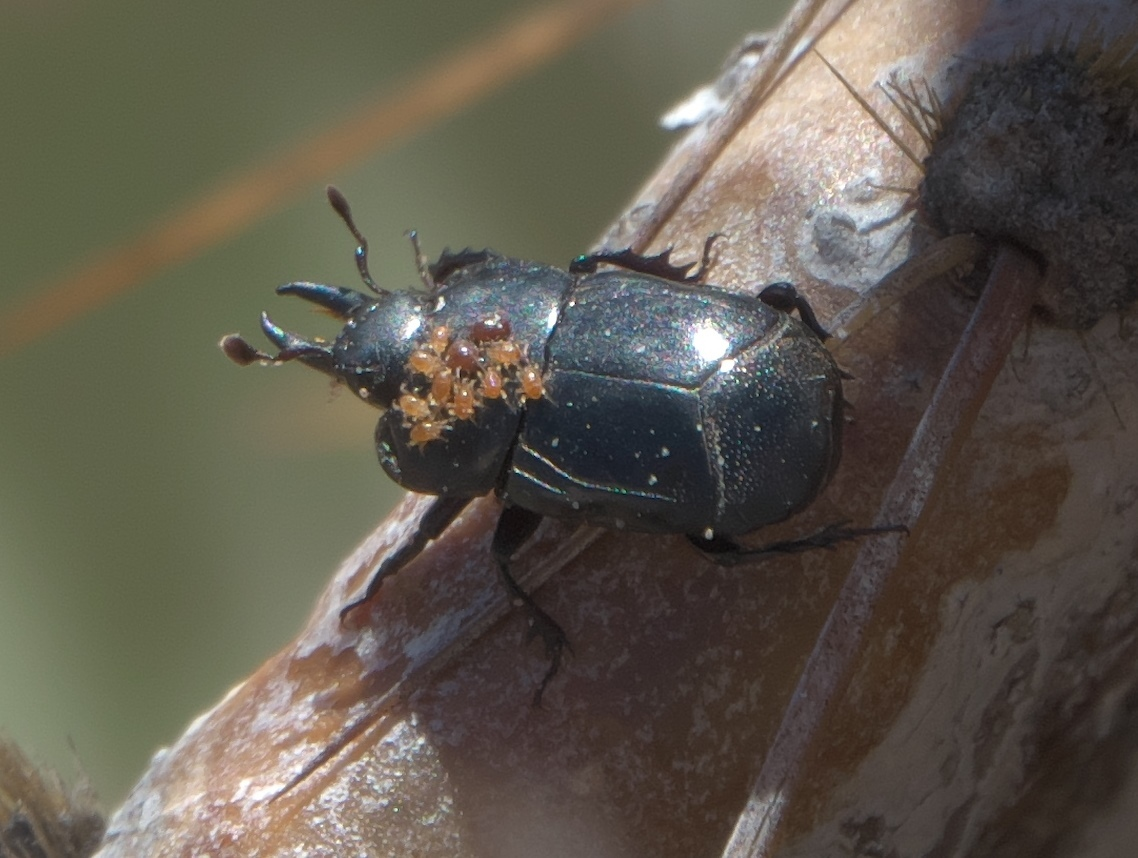
- Iliotona cacti, Arizona

Scientific classification
- Kingdom: Animalia
- Phylum: Arthropoda
- Clade: Pancrustacea
- Class: Insecta
- Order: Coleoptera
- Suborder: Polyphaga
- Infraorder: Staphyliniformia
- Family: Histeridae
- Genus: Iliotona
- Species: I. cacti

Binomial name
- Iliotona cacti (J. L. LeConte, 1851)

Synonyms
- Hololepta cacti LeConte, 1851

= Iliotona cacti =

Species of beetle

Iliotona cacti is a species of clown beetle in the family Histeridae. It is found in the Southwestern United States, Texas, Mexico, and Guatemala. It is associated with decaying plant matter, primarily various cacti but also willow bark.
