= Baconia festiva =

Scientific classification
- Kingdom: Animalia
- Phylum: Arthropoda
- Class: Insecta
- Order: Coleoptera
- Suborder: Polyphaga
- Infraorder: Staphyliniformia
- Family: Histeridae
- Genus: Baconia
- Species: B. festiva

Binomial name
- Baconia festiva Lewis, 1891

Species of beetle

Baconia festiva is a species of clown beetle in the family Histeridae. It is found in South America.
