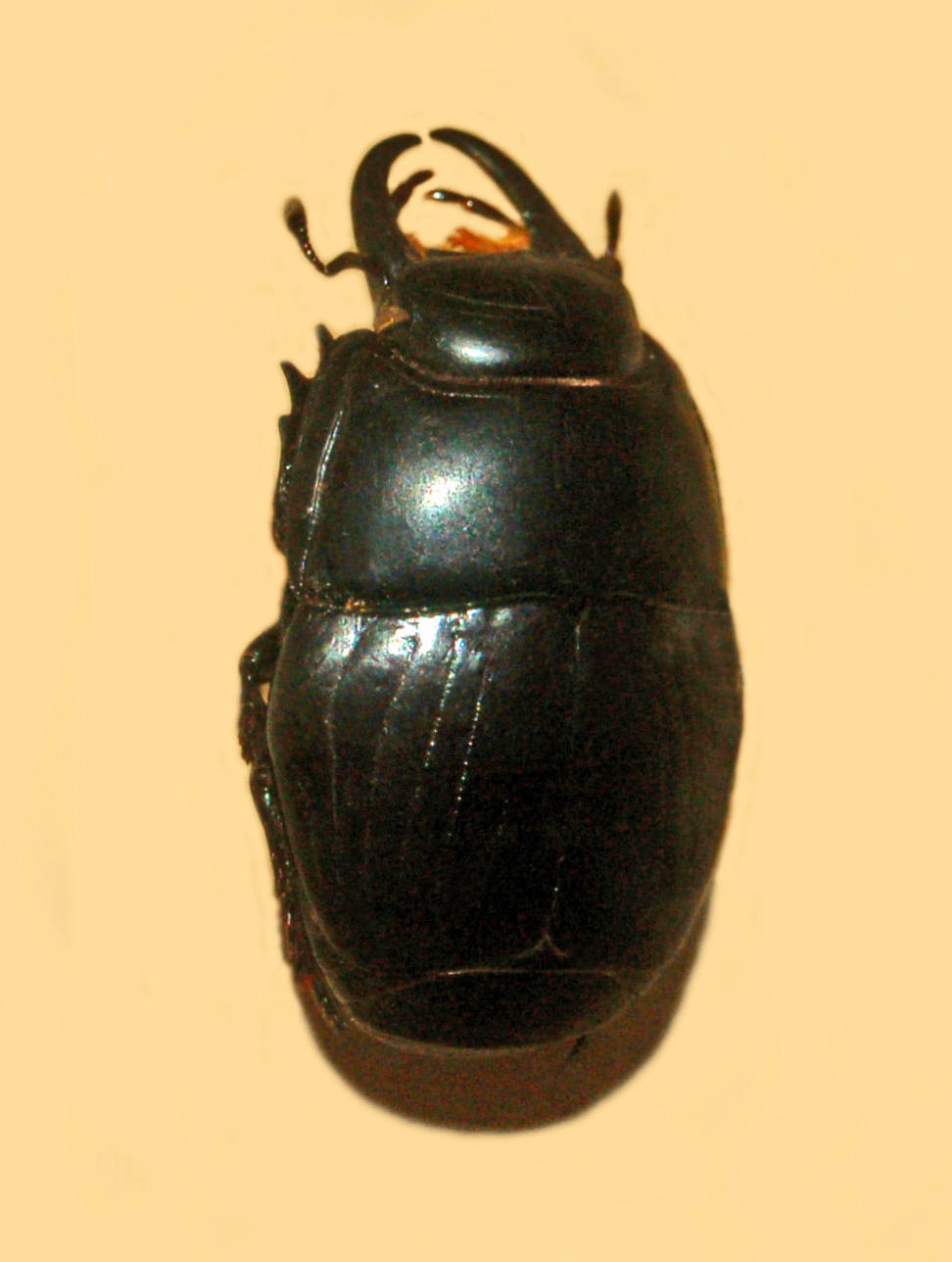
- Museum specimen

Scientific classification
- Kingdom: Animalia
- Phylum: Arthropoda
- Clade: Pancrustacea
- Class: Insecta
- Order: Coleoptera
- Suborder: Polyphaga
- Infraorder: Staphyliniformia
- Family: Histeridae
- Genus: Pactolinus
- Species: P. gigas

Binomial name
- Pactolinus gigas (Paykull, 1811)

Synonyms
- Hister validus Erichson,1834

= Pactolinus gigas =

Species of beetle

Pactolinus gigas is a species of the Histeridae family of beetles.

== Description ==
Pactolinus gigas has a black body, flat and ovoid. Elytra are shortened and antennae are elbowed with clubbed ends. The mandible mouthpart is well developed. These beetles feed on dung beetle larvae of the genus Ontophagus.

== Distribution ==
This species can be found in the Tropical Africa.
