= Psiloscelis abnormalis =

Scientific classification
- Kingdom: Animalia
- Phylum: Arthropoda
- Class: Insecta
- Order: Coleoptera
- Suborder: Polyphaga
- Infraorder: Staphyliniformia
- Family: Histeridae
- Genus: Psiloscelis
- Species: P. abnormalis

Binomial name
- Psiloscelis abnormalis Mann, 1924

Species of beetle

Psiloscelis abnormalis is a species of clown beetle in the family Histeridae. It is found in North America.
