= Merohister osculatus =

Scientific classification
- Kingdom: Animalia
- Phylum: Arthropoda
- Class: Insecta
- Order: Coleoptera
- Suborder: Polyphaga
- Infraorder: Staphyliniformia
- Family: Histeridae
- Genus: Merohister
- Species: M. osculatus

Binomial name
- Merohister osculatus (Blatchley, 1910)

Species of beetle

Merohister osculatus is a species of clown beetle in the family Histeridae. It is found in North America.
