= Baconia aeneomicans =

Scientific classification
- Kingdom: Animalia
- Phylum: Arthropoda
- Class: Insecta
- Order: Coleoptera
- Suborder: Polyphaga
- Infraorder: Staphyliniformia
- Family: Histeridae
- Genus: Baconia
- Species: B. aeneomicans

Binomial name
- Baconia aeneomicans (Horn, 1873)

Species of beetle

Baconia aeneomicans is a species of clown beetle in the family Histeridae. It is found in North America.
