= Spilodiscus ulkei =

Scientific classification
- Kingdom: Animalia
- Phylum: Arthropoda
- Class: Insecta
- Order: Coleoptera
- Suborder: Polyphaga
- Infraorder: Staphyliniformia
- Family: Histeridae
- Genus: Spilodiscus
- Species: S. ulkei

Binomial name
- Spilodiscus ulkei (Horn, 1870)

Synonyms
- Spilodiscus arizonae (Horn, 1870); Spilodiscus coruscans (Casey, 1916); Spilodiscus sculpticauda (Casey, 1893)

Species of beetle

Spilodiscus ulkei is a species of clown beetle in the family Histeridae. It is found in Central America and North America.
