= Phelister haemorrhous =

Scientific classification
- Kingdom: Animalia
- Phylum: Arthropoda
- Class: Insecta
- Order: Coleoptera
- Suborder: Polyphaga
- Infraorder: Staphyliniformia
- Family: Histeridae
- Genus: Phelister
- Species: P. haemorrhous

Binomial name
- Phelister haemorrhous Marseul, 1853

Species of beetle

Phelister haemorrhous is a species of clown beetle in the family Histeridae. It is found in Europe and Northern Asia (excluding China), Central America, and South America.
