= Yarmister barberi =

Scientific classification
- Kingdom: Animalia
- Phylum: Arthropoda
- Class: Insecta
- Order: Coleoptera
- Suborder: Polyphaga
- Infraorder: Staphyliniformia
- Family: Histeridae
- Genus: Yarmister
- Species: Y. barberi

Binomial name
- Yarmister barberi Wenzel, 1939

Species of beetle

Yarmister barberi is a species of clown beetle, family Histeridae. It is found in Florida (USA) and in French Guiana.
