= Platysoma aurelianum =

Scientific classification
- Kingdom: Animalia
- Phylum: Arthropoda
- Class: Insecta
- Order: Coleoptera
- Suborder: Polyphaga
- Infraorder: Staphyliniformia
- Family: Histeridae
- Genus: Platysoma
- Species: P. aurelianum

Binomial name
- Platysoma aurelianum (Horn, 1873)

Species of beetle

Platysoma aurelianum is a species of clown beetle in the family Histeridae. It is found in North America.
