= Platysoma parallelum =

Scientific classification
- Kingdom: Animalia
- Phylum: Arthropoda
- Class: Insecta
- Order: Coleoptera
- Suborder: Polyphaga
- Infraorder: Staphyliniformia
- Family: Histeridae
- Genus: Platysoma
- Species: P. parallelum

Binomial name
- Platysoma parallelum (Say, 1825)

Species of beetle

Platysoma parallelum is a species of clown beetle in the family Histeridae. It is found in North America.
