= Operclipygus geometricus =

Scientific classification
- Kingdom: Animalia
- Phylum: Arthropoda
- Class: Insecta
- Order: Coleoptera
- Suborder: Polyphaga
- Infraorder: Staphyliniformia
- Family: Histeridae
- Genus: Operclipygus
- Species: O. geometricus

Binomial name
- Operclipygus geometricus (Casey, 1893)

Synonyms
- Phelister geometricus Casey, 1893

Species of beetle

Operclipygus geometricus is a species of clown beetle in the family Histeridae. It is found in Central America and North America.
