= Merohister arboricavi =

Scientific classification
- Kingdom: Animalia
- Phylum: Arthropoda
- Class: Insecta
- Order: Coleoptera
- Suborder: Polyphaga
- Infraorder: Staphyliniformia
- Family: Histeridae
- Genus: Merohister
- Species: M. arboricavi

Binomial name
- Merohister arboricavi Johnson in Johnson, Lundgren, Newton, Thayer, Wenzel & Wenzel, 1991

Species of beetle

Merohister arboricavi is a species of clown beetle in the family Histeridae. It is found in North America.
