= Omalodes grossus =

Scientific classification
- Kingdom: Animalia
- Phylum: Arthropoda
- Class: Insecta
- Order: Coleoptera
- Suborder: Polyphaga
- Infraorder: Staphyliniformia
- Family: Histeridae
- Genus: Omalodes
- Species: O. grossus

Binomial name
- Omalodes grossus Marseul, 1853

Species of beetle

Omalodes grossus is a species of clown beetle in the family Histeridae. It is found in Central America and North America.

== Subspecies ==
These two subspecies belong to the species Omalodes grossus:

- Omalodes grossus grossus Marseul, 1853
- Omalodes grossus lubricans Casey, 1893
