= Phelister brevistriatus =

Scientific classification
- Kingdom: Animalia
- Phylum: Arthropoda
- Class: Insecta
- Order: Coleoptera
- Suborder: Polyphaga
- Infraorder: Staphyliniformia
- Family: Histeridae
- Genus: Phelister
- Species: P. brevistriatus

Binomial name
- Phelister brevistriatus Casey, 1916

Species of beetle

Phelister brevistriatus is a species of clown beetle in the family Histeridae. It is found in Central America and North America.
