= Operclipygus striatellus =

Scientific classification
- Kingdom: Animalia
- Phylum: Arthropoda
- Class: Insecta
- Order: Coleoptera
- Suborder: Polyphaga
- Infraorder: Staphyliniformia
- Family: Histeridae
- Genus: Operclipygus
- Species: O. striatellus

Binomial name
- Operclipygus striatellus (Fall, 1917)

Synonyms
- Tribalister striatellus Fall, 1917

Species of beetle

Operclipygus striatellus is a species of clown beetle in the family Histeridae. It is found in North America.
