= Platysoma cylindricum =

Scientific classification
- Kingdom: Animalia
- Phylum: Arthropoda
- Class: Insecta
- Order: Coleoptera
- Suborder: Polyphaga
- Infraorder: Staphyliniformia
- Family: Histeridae
- Genus: Platysoma
- Species: P. cylindricum

Binomial name
- Platysoma cylindricum (Paykull, 1811)

Synonyms
- Cylistix cylindrica (Palisot de Beauvois, 1818)

Species of beetle

Platysoma cylindricum is a species of clown beetle in the family Histeridae. It is found in North America.
