= Spilodiscus biplagiatus =

Scientific classification
- Kingdom: Animalia
- Phylum: Arthropoda
- Clade: Pancrustacea
- Class: Insecta
- Order: Coleoptera
- Suborder: Polyphaga
- Infraorder: Staphyliniformia
- Family: Histeridae
- Genus: Spilodiscus
- Species: S. biplagiatus

Binomial name
- Spilodiscus biplagiatus (J. E. LeConte, 1845)

Species of beetle

Spilodiscus biplagiatus is a species of clown beetle in the family Histeridae. It is found in Central America and North America.
