= Psiloscelis planipes =

Scientific classification
- Kingdom: Animalia
- Phylum: Arthropoda
- Clade: Pancrustacea
- Class: Insecta
- Order: Coleoptera
- Suborder: Polyphaga
- Infraorder: Staphyliniformia
- Family: Histeridae
- Genus: Psiloscelis
- Species: P. planipes

Binomial name
- Psiloscelis planipes (J. L. LeConte, 1852)

Species of beetle

Psiloscelis planipes is a species of clown beetle in the family Histeridae. It is found in North America.
