= Strigister tecolotito =

Scientific classification
- Kingdom: Animalia
- Phylum: Arthropoda
- Class: Insecta
- Order: Coleoptera
- Suborder: Polyphaga
- Infraorder: Staphyliniformia
- Family: Histeridae
- Genus: Strigister
- Species: S. tecolotito

Binomial name
- Strigister tecolotito Caterino, Tishechkin & Proudfoot, 2013

Species of beetle

Strigister tecolotito is a species of clown beetle in the family Histeridae. It is found in North America.
