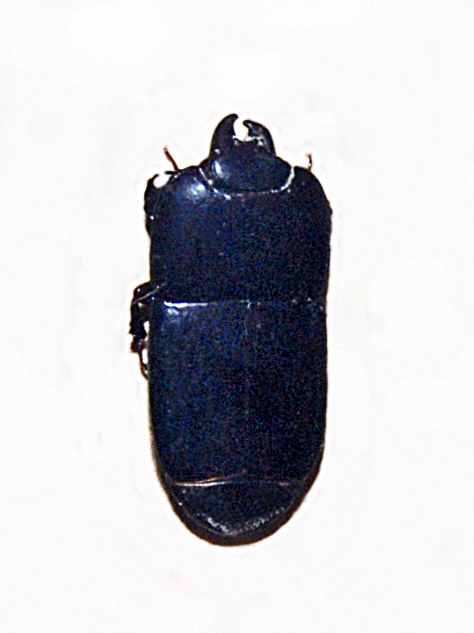
- Platylister foliaceus from São Tomé and Príncipe. Museum specimen

Scientific classification
- Kingdom: Animalia
- Phylum: Arthropoda
- Class: Insecta
- Order: Coleoptera
- Suborder: Polyphaga
- Infraorder: Staphyliniformia
- Family: Histeridae
- Genus: Platylister
- Species: P. foliaceus

Binomial name
- Platylister foliaceus (Paykull, 1811)

Synonyms
- Platysoma (Apobletes) foliaceum (Paykull, 1811)

= Platylister foliaceus =

Species of beetle

Platylister foliaceus is a species of clown beetles belonging to the family Histeridae.

== Description ==
Platylister foliaceus can reach a length of about 10 millimetres (0.39 in) and a width of about 6 millimetres (0.24 in). Body is shiny black and very flat.

== Distribution ==
This species is present in tropical Africa (Guinea, Kenya, South Africa, Tanzania, Gambia).
