= Spilodiscus sellatus =

Scientific classification
- Kingdom: Animalia
- Phylum: Arthropoda
- Clade: Pancrustacea
- Class: Insecta
- Order: Coleoptera
- Suborder: Polyphaga
- Infraorder: Staphyliniformia
- Family: Histeridae
- Genus: Spilodiscus
- Species: S. sellatus

Binomial name
- Spilodiscus sellatus (J. L. LeConte, 1857)

Species of beetle

Spilodiscus sellatus is a species of clown beetle in the family Histeridae. It is found in North America.
