= Spilodiscus =

Scientific classification
- Kingdom: Animalia
- Phylum: Arthropoda
- Clade: Pancrustacea
- Class: Insecta
- Order: Coleoptera
- Suborder: Polyphaga
- Infraorder: Staphyliniformia
- Family: Histeridae
- Subfamily: Histerinae
- Tribe: Histerini
- Genus: Spilodiscus; Lewis, 1906

Genus of beetles

Spilodiscus is a genus of clown beetles in the family Histeridae. There are about nine described species in Spilodiscus.

== Species ==
- Spilodiscus arcuatus (Say, 1825)
- Spilodiscus biplagiatus (J. E. LeConte, 1845)
- Spilodiscus flohri (Lewis, 1898)
- Spilodiscus floridanus Ross, 1940
- Spilodiscus gloveri (Horn, 1870)
- Spilodiscus instratus (J. L. LeConte, 1859)
- Spilodiscus sellatus (J. L. LeConte, 1857)
- Spilodiscus skelleyi Caterino and Kovarik, 2001
- Spilodiscus ulkei (Horn, 1870)
