= Spilodiscus arcuatus =

Scientific classification
- Kingdom: Animalia
- Phylum: Arthropoda
- Class: Insecta
- Order: Coleoptera
- Suborder: Polyphaga
- Infraorder: Staphyliniformia
- Family: Histeridae
- Genus: Spilodiscus
- Species: S. arcuatus

Binomial name
- Spilodiscus arcuatus (Say, 1825)

Species of beetle

Spilodiscus arcuatus is a species of clown beetle in the family Histeridae. It is found in North America.
