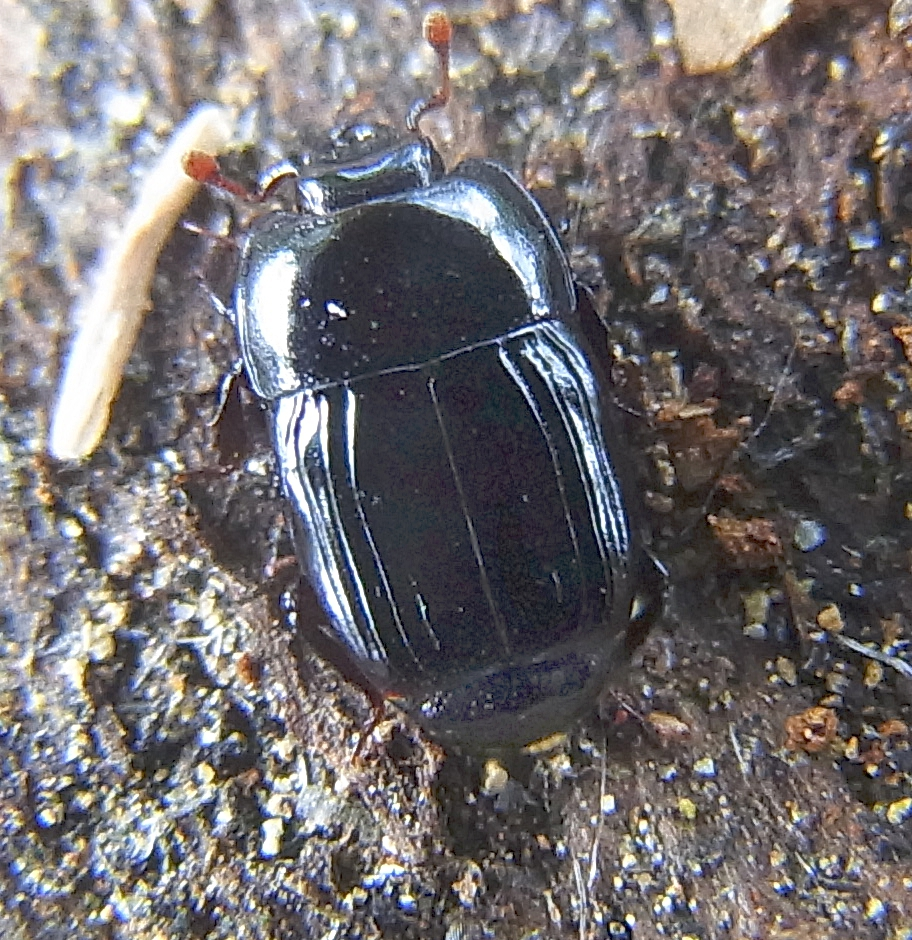
- Platysoma compressum

Scientific classification
- Kingdom: Animalia
- Phylum: Arthropoda
- Clade: Pancrustacea
- Class: Insecta
- Order: Coleoptera
- Suborder: Polyphaga
- Infraorder: Staphyliniformia
- Family: Histeridae
- Subfamily: Histerinae
- Tribe: Platysomatini
- Genus: Platysoma; Leach, 1817

Subgenera
- Cylister; Cylistus; Platysoma

Synonyms
- Abbotia Leach, 1830; Cylister Cooman, 1941; Cylistix Marseul, 1857; Cylistus de Marseul, 1853; Platysomum Gistel, 1856

= Platysoma =

Genus of beetles

Platysoma is a genus of clown beetles in the family Histeridae. There are more than 80 described species in Platysoma.

== Species ==
These 81 species belong to the genus Platysoma:

- Platysoma abyssinicum Lewis, 1885
- Platysoma aequum (J.L.LeConte, 1863)
- Platysoma afghanum (Kryzhanovskij, 1980)
- Platysoma anceps (Schmidt, 1892)
- Platysoma angustatum (Hoffmann, 1803)
- Platysoma asiatica Lewis, 1892
- Platysoma asiaticum (Lewis, 1892)
- Platysoma attenuatum J.E.LeConte, 1844
- Platysoma aurelianum (Horn, 1873)
- Platysoma aureoliferum Marseul, 1864
- Platysoma baliolum Lewis, 1889
- Platysoma basale J.L.LeConte, 1862
- Platysoma beybienkoi Kryzhanovskij, 1972
- Platysoma bifoveolatum (Bousquet & Laplante, 1999)
- Platysoma bimaculatum Mazur, 1990
- Platysoma brahmani Lewis, 1910
- Platysoma brevistriatum Lewis, 1888
- Platysoma ceylonicum Motschulsky, 1863
- Platysoma chinense Lewis, 1894
- Platysoma clarenciae Marseul, 1870
- Platysoma coarctatum J.E.LeConte, 1844
- Platysoma cognatum Sharp, 1876
- Platysoma compressum (Herbst, 1783)
- Platysoma conditum Marseul, 1864
- Platysoma coomani Thérond, 1955
- Platysoma cornix Marseul, 1861
- Platysoma cylindricum (Paykull, 1811)
- Platysoma debile Marseul, 1864
- Platysoma deficiens (Casey, 1924)
- Platysoma deplanatum (Gyllenhal, 1808)
- Platysoma directum Lewis, 1885
- Platysoma dissimile Motschulsky, 1863
- Platysoma dufali Marseul, 1864
- Platysoma elongatum (Thunberg, 1787)
- Platysoma feles Marseul, 1864
- Platysoma filiforme Erichson, 1834
- Platysoma gemellum (Cooman, 1929)
- Platysoma germanum Lewis, 1907
- Platysoma gracile J.E.LeConte, 1845
- Platysoma ineditum (Desbordes, 1925)
- Platysoma inexpectatum Lackner, 2004
- Platysoma joliveti Gomy, 2007
- Platysoma jongwooki Ôhara & Kee-Jeong Ahn, 2018
- Platysoma koreanum Mazur, 1999
- Platysoma leconti Marseul, 1853
- Platysoma lineare Erichson, 1834
- Platysoma lineicolle Marseul, 1873
- Platysoma loriae Schmidt, 1893
- Platysoma malignum Cooman, 1941
- Platysoma minax Mazur, 1999
- Platysoma moluccanum Marseul, 1864
- Platysoma multistriatum Lea, 1925
- Platysoma novum Lewis, 1885
- Platysoma orientale (Lewis, 1892)
- Platysoma parallelum (Say, 1825)
- Platysoma paugami (Le Guillou, 1844)
- Platysoma punctigerum (J.L.LeConte, 1862)
- Platysoma quinquestriatum Motschulsky, 1863
- Platysoma raffrayi Desbordes, 1929
- Platysoma rasile Lewis, 1884
- Platysoma rimarium Erichson, 1834
- Platysoma rufopygum Lewis, 1905
- Platysoma ruptistriatum Lewis, 1904
- Platysoma semistriatum Motschulsky, 1863
- Platysoma sichuanum Mazur, 2007
- Platysoma striatipectum Marseul, 1870
- Platysoma striatipectus Marseul, 1870
- Platysoma striatisternum Lewis, 1892
- Platysoma striativarium Lea, 1925
- Platysoma striativentre Lea, 1925
- Platysoma striativentris Lea, 1925
- Platysoma subcostatum Lea, 1925
- Platysoma subdepressum MacLeay, 1871
- Platysoma subquadratum Motschulsky, 1863
- Platysoma suturistrium Marseul, 1879
- Platysoma tabella Casey, 1893
- Platysoma takehikoi Ôhara, 1986
- Platysoma torpens Marseul, 1864
- Platysoma tsushimae Ôhara, 1986
- Platysoma vulsum Bickhardt, 1920
- Platysoma yunnanum (Kryzhanovskij, 1972)
