= Spilodiscus gloveri =

Scientific classification
- Kingdom: Animalia
- Phylum: Arthropoda
- Class: Insecta
- Order: Coleoptera
- Suborder: Polyphaga
- Infraorder: Staphyliniformia
- Family: Histeridae
- Genus: Spilodiscus
- Species: S. gloveri

Binomial name
- Spilodiscus gloveri (Horn, 1870)

Species of beetle

Spilodiscus gloveri is a species of clown beetle in the family Histeridae. It is found in North America.
