= Eurylister niger =

Scientific classification
- Kingdom: Animalia
- Phylum: Arthropoda
- Class: Insecta
- Order: Coleoptera
- Suborder: Polyphaga
- Infraorder: Staphyliniformia
- Family: Histeridae
- Genus: Eurylister
- Species: E. niger

Binomial name
- Eurylister niger (Bousquet & Laplante, 2006)

Synonyms
- Eblisia nigra Bousquet and Laplante, 2006

Species of beetle

Eurylister niger is a species of clown beetle in the family Histeridae. It is found in North America.
