= Geminorhabdus =

Scientific classification
- Kingdom: Animalia
- Phylum: Arthropoda
- Class: Insecta
- Order: Coleoptera
- Suborder: Polyphaga
- Infraorder: Staphyliniformia
- Family: Histeridae
- Tribe: Histerini
- Genus: Geminorhabdus; Mazur, 2007

Genus of beetle

Geminorhabdus is a genus of clown beetle in the subfamily Histerinae. The genus has been found throughout Southeast Africa.

== Taxonomy ==
The genus Geminorhabdus contains the following five species:

- Geminorhabdus angolensis Thérond, 1963
- Geminorhabdus crenulistrius Lewis, 1913
- Geminorhabdus marshalli Lewis, 1897
- Geminorhabdus maymbensis Burgeon, 1939
- Geminorhabdus simulans Schmidt, 1889
