= Platysoma deficiens =

Scientific classification
- Kingdom: Animalia
- Phylum: Arthropoda
- Class: Insecta
- Order: Coleoptera
- Suborder: Polyphaga
- Infraorder: Staphyliniformia
- Family: Histeridae
- Genus: Platysoma
- Species: P. deficiens

Binomial name
- Platysoma deficiens (Casey, 1924)

Synonyms
- Cylistix deficiens Casey, 1924

Species of beetle

Platysoma deficiens is a species of clown beetle in the family Histeridae. It is found in North America.
