= Spilodiscus flohri =

Scientific classification
- Kingdom: Animalia
- Phylum: Arthropoda
- Class: Insecta
- Order: Coleoptera
- Suborder: Polyphaga
- Infraorder: Staphyliniformia
- Family: Histeridae
- Genus: Spilodiscus
- Species: S. flohri

Binomial name
- Spilodiscus flohri (Lewis, 1898)

Species of beetle

Spilodiscus flohri is a species of clown beetles in the family Histeridae. It is found in Central America and North America.
