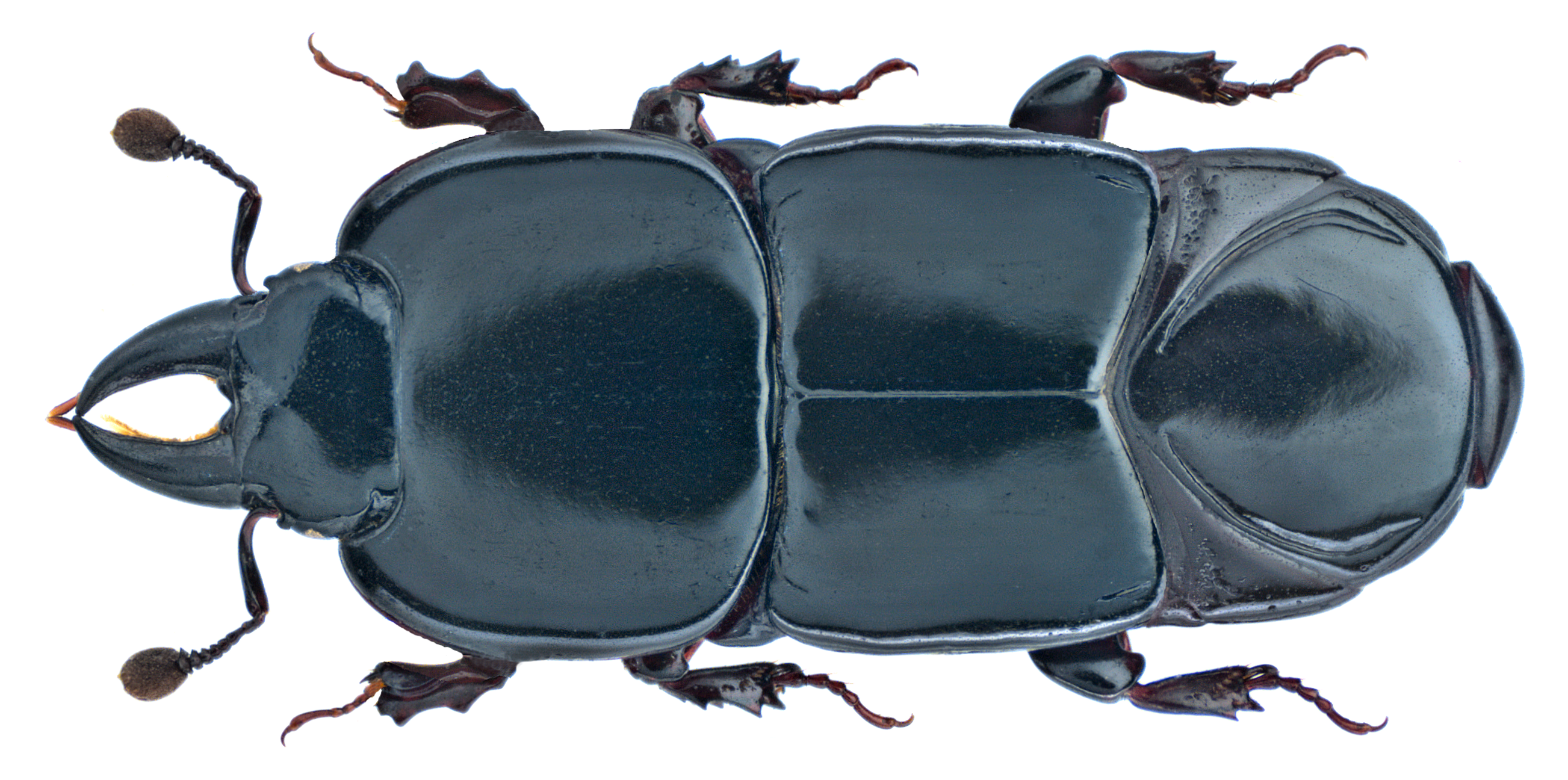
- Hololepta elongata

Scientific classification
- Kingdom: Animalia
- Phylum: Arthropoda
- Clade: Pancrustacea
- Class: Insecta
- Order: Coleoptera
- Suborder: Polyphaga
- Infraorder: Staphyliniformia
- Family: Histeridae
- Subfamily: Histerinae
- Tribe: Hololeptini; Hope, 1840

= Hololeptini =

Tribe of beetles

Hololeptini is a tribe of clown beetles in the family Histeridae. There are about 6 genera and more than 130 described species in Hololeptini.

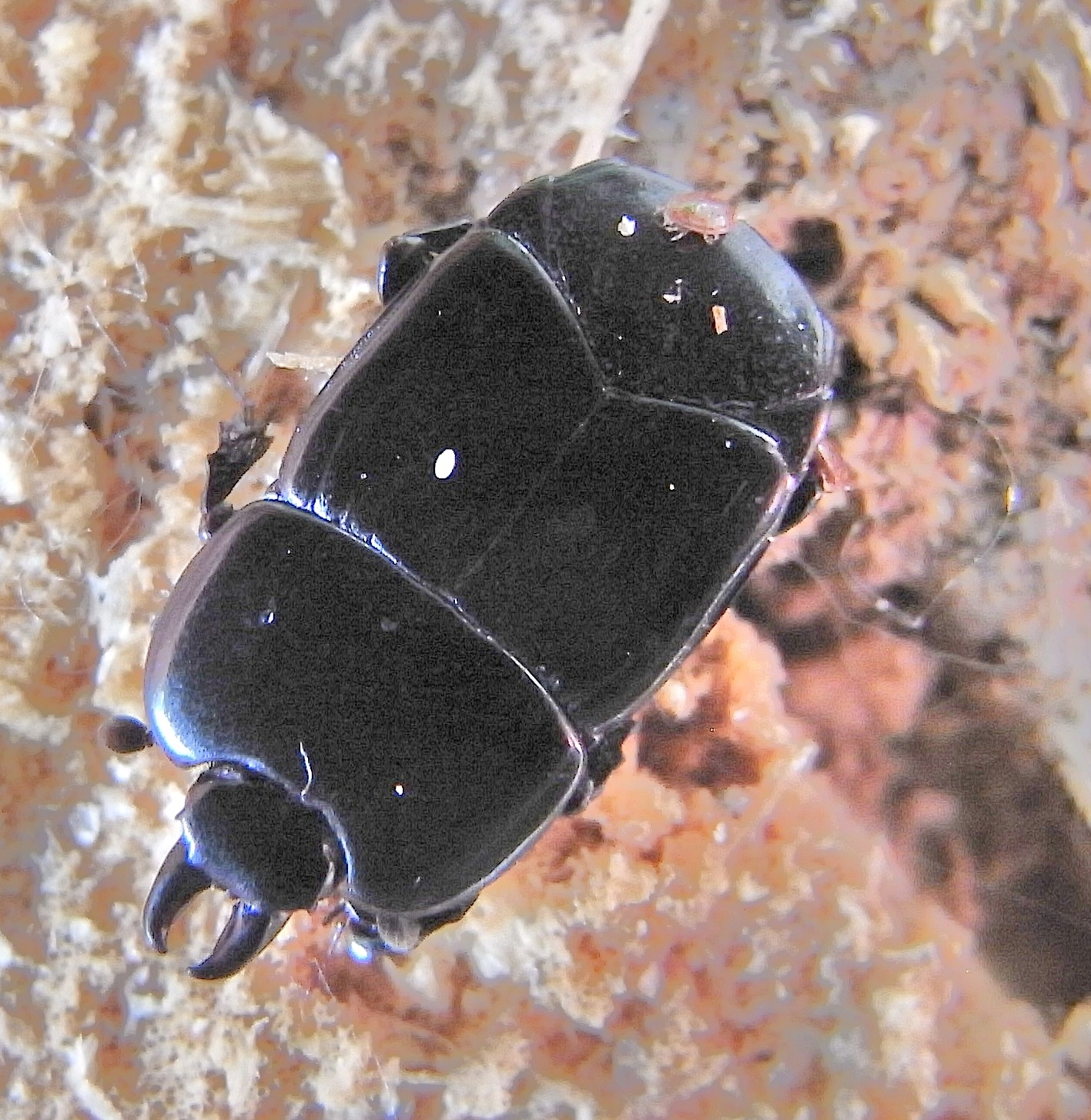
Hololepta plana

== Genera ==
These six genera belong to the tribe Hololeptini:

- Dimalus Marseul, 1870
- Eutidium Lewis, 1903
- Hololepta Paykull, 1811
- Iliotona Carnochan, 1917
- Oxysternus Erichson, 1834
- Petalosoma Lewis, 1903
