= Yarmister =

Scientific classification
- Kingdom: Animalia
- Phylum: Arthropoda
- Class: Insecta
- Order: Coleoptera
- Suborder: Polyphaga
- Infraorder: Staphyliniformia
- Family: Histeridae
- Tribe: Exosternini
- Genus: Yarmister; Wenzel, 1939

Genus of beetles

Yarmister is a genus of clown beetles in the family Histeridae. There are at least two described species in Yarmister.

== Species ==
These two species belong to the genus Yarmister:

- Yarmister barberi Wenzel, 1939
- Yarmister emersoni Wenzel, 1944
