= Philoxenus desertorum =

Scientific classification
- Kingdom: Animalia
- Phylum: Arthropoda
- Class: Insecta
- Order: Coleoptera
- Suborder: Polyphaga
- Infraorder: Staphyliniformia
- Family: Histeridae
- Genus: Philoxenus; Mazur, 1991
- Species: P. desertorum

Binomial name
- Philoxenus desertorum Mazur, 1991

Species of beetle

Philoxenus is a genus of clown beetles in the family Histeridae. There is one described species in Philoxenus, Philoxenus desertorum.
