= Merohister =

Scientific classification
- Kingdom: Animalia
- Phylum: Arthropoda
- Class: Insecta
- Order: Coleoptera
- Suborder: Polyphaga
- Infraorder: Staphyliniformia
- Family: Histeridae
- Tribe: Histerini
- Genus: Merohister; Reitter, 1909

Genus of beetles

Merohister is a genus of clown beetles in the family Histeridae. There are about eight described species in Merohister.

== Species ==
These eight species belong to the genus Merohister:

- Merohister aino (Lewis, 1884)
- Merohister arboricavi Johnson in Johnson, Lundgren, Newton, Thayer, Wenzel & Wenzel, 1991
- Merohister ariasi (Marseul, 1864)
- Merohister asoka (Lewis, 1910)
- Merohister jekekli (Marseul, 1857)
- Merohister jekeli (Marseul, 1857)
- Merohister osculatus (Blatchley, 1910)
- Merohister uenoi Ôhara, 1992
