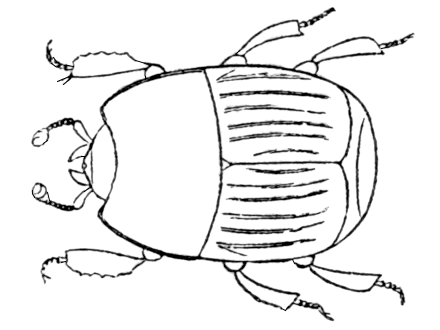
- Phelister

Scientific classification
- Kingdom: Animalia
- Phylum: Arthropoda
- Class: Insecta
- Order: Coleoptera
- Suborder: Polyphaga
- Infraorder: Staphyliniformia
- Family: Histeridae
- Tribe: Exosternini
- Genus: Phelister; Marseul, 1853

= Phelister =

Genus of beetles

Phelister is a genus of clown beetles in the family Histeridae. There are more than 90 described species in Phelister.

== Species ==
These 95 species belong to the genus Phelister:

- Phelister acoposternus Marseul, 1853
- Phelister aduncus Schmidt, 1893
- Phelister affinis J. E. LeConte, 1860
- Phelister alticola Schmidt, 1893
- Phelister amplistrius Schmidt, 1893
- Phelister atrolucens Casey
- Phelister balzanii Schmidt, 1889
- Phelister bipulvinatus Marseul, 1853
- Phelister bistriatus Hinton, 1935
- Phelister blairi Hinton, 1935
- Phelister bolivianus Bickhardt, 1920
- Phelister bovinus Marseul, 1853
- Phelister brevis Bickhardt, 1917
- Phelister brevistriatus Casey, 1916
- Phelister brevistrius Marseul, 1853
- Phelister bruchi Bickhardt, 1920
- Phelister canalis Lewis, 1888
- Phelister carinifrons Schmidt, 1893
- Phelister carinullus Hinton, 1935
- Phelister carnochani Casey
- Phelister chapadae Lewis, 1900
- Phelister chilicola Marseul, 1870
- Phelister colombiae Lewis, 1908
- Phelister completus Schmidt, 1893
- Phelister condor Mazur, 1988
- Phelister contractus Casey
- Phelister daugar Marseul, 1861
- Phelister degallieri Kanaar, 1997
- Phelister desbordesi Bickhardt, 1917
- Phelister egincola Marseul, 1889
- Phelister erraticus Marseul, 1887
- Phelister finitimus Bickhardt, 1918
- Phelister flectohumerale Wenzel & Dybas, 1941
- Phelister foveicollis Lewis, 1902
- Phelister fractistrius Lewis, 1908
- Phelister fulvulus Marseul, 1870
- Phelister gebieni Bickhardt, 1920
- Phelister geijskesi Kanaar, 1997
- Phelister globiformis Marseul, 1853
- Phelister gracilis Schmidt, 1889
- Phelister haemorrhous Marseul, 1853
- Phelister hamistrius Schmidt, 1893
- Phelister interpunctatus Kirsch, 1866
- Phelister interrogans Marseul, 1889
- Phelister interruptus Hinton, 1935
- Phelister latus Wenzel & Dybas, 1941
- Phelister luculentus Bickhardt, 1917
- Phelister miramon Marseul, 1861
- Phelister mobilensis Casey, 1916
- Phelister mobiliensis
- Phelister muscicapa Marseul, 1870
- Phelister nanus Schmidt, 1889
- Phelister nidicola Bickhardt, 1920
- Phelister notandus Schmidt, 1893
- Phelister panamensis J. E. LeConte, 1860
- Phelister parallelisternus Schmidt, 1893
- Phelister petro Bickhardt, 1917
- Phelister praecox (Erichson, 1847)
- Phelister praedatorius Reichensperger, 1939
- Phelister pulvis Marseul, 1861
- Phelister pumilus (Erichson, 1834)
- Phelister puncticollis Hinton, 1935
- Phelister purgamenticolus Wenzel & Dybas, 1941
- Phelister pusillus Hinton, 1935
- Phelister pusio (Erichson, 1847)
- Phelister pusioides Marseul, 1861
- Phelister pygmaeus Bickhardt, 1918
- Phelister rectisternus Lewis, 1908
- Phelister rouzeti (Fairmaire, 1849)
- Phelister rubens Marseul, 1853
- Phelister rubicundus Marseul, 1889
- Phelister rufinotus Marseul, 1861
- Phelister ruptistrius Schmidt, 1893
- Phelister salobrus Marseul, 1887
- Phelister sanguinipennis Marseul, 1853
- Phelister sculpturatus Schmidt, 1893
- Phelister severus Bickhardt, 1917
- Phelister simplex Casey
- Phelister simus Marseul, 1861
- Phelister stercoricola Bickhardt, 1909
- Phelister striatinotus Wenzel & Dybas, 1941
- Phelister subgibbosus Hinton, 1935
- Phelister subrotundus (Say, 1825)
- Phelister testudo Lewis, 1908
- Phelister thiemei Schmidt, 1889
- Phelister tremolerasi Bickhardt, 1920
- Phelister trigonisternus Marseul, 1889
- Phelister tristriatus Hinton, 1935
- Phelister uncistrius Lewis, 1888
- Phelister venustus
- Phelister vernus (Say, 1825)
- Phelister vibius Marseul, 1861
- Phelister weberi Bickhardt, 1917
- Phelister wickhami Casey, 1916
- Phelister williamsi Wenzel & Dybas, 1941
