= Eurylister =

Scientific classification
- Kingdom: Animalia
- Phylum: Arthropoda
- Class: Insecta
- Order: Coleoptera
- Suborder: Polyphaga
- Infraorder: Staphyliniformia
- Family: Histeridae
- Tribe: Platysomatini
- Genus: Eurylister; Bickhardt, 1920

Genus of beetles

Eurylister is a genus of clown beetles in the family Histeridae. There are more than 40 described species in Eurylister.

== Species ==
These 41 species belong to the genus Eurylister:

- Eurylister bakewelli (Marseul, 1864)
- Eurylister brevimargo (Schmidt, 1895)
- Eurylister brevis (Schmidt, 1889)
- Eurylister carolinus (Paykull, 1811)
- Eurylister ceramicola (Marseul, 1864)
- Eurylister convexiusculus (MacLeay, 1871)
- Eurylister crassus (Bickhardt, 1913)
- Eurylister desbordesi (Cooman, 1930)
- Eurylister discrepans (Marseul, 1879)
- Eurylister disparilis (Lewis, 1900)
- Eurylister dispersus Bickhardt, 1920
- Eurylister distinctus (Schmidt, 1892)
- Eurylister dorsalis (Lewis, 1905)
- Eurylister duplicans (Cooman, 1955)
- Eurylister egregius Bickhardt, 1920
- Eurylister elinguus (Lewis, 1885)
- Eurylister glabrifrons (Mazur, 1994)
- Eurylister guinensis (Mazur, 1989)
- Eurylister infans Bickhardt, 1920
- Eurylister integrus (Schmidt, 1889)
- Eurylister laevidorsum (Lewis, 1905)
- Eurylister laevis (Marseul, 1853)
- Eurylister mimicus (Lewis, 1914)
- Eurylister molestus Cooman, 1955
- Eurylister mutilatus (Schmidt, 1893)
- Eurylister niger (Bousquet & Laplante, 2006)
- Eurylister nudus Bickhardt, 1920
- Eurylister oberndorferi (Schmidt, 1889)
- Eurylister pictipennis (Lewis, 1901)
- Eurylister pygidialis (Lewis, 1905)
- Eurylister reinecki Bickhardt, 1920
- Eurylister satzumae (Lewis, 1889)
- Eurylister scalptus (Lewis, 1902)
- Eurylister silvestria (Schmidt, 1897)
- Eurylister silvestris (Schmidt, 1897)
- Eurylister sincerus (Schmidt, 1892)
- Eurylister solitarius (Lewis, 1891)
- Eurylister terminatus (Schmidt, 1895)
- Eurylister tonkinensis (Cooman, 1956)
- Eurylister uniformis (Lewis, 1894)
- Eurylister vitalisi (Desbordes, 1919)
