= Psiloscelis =

Scientific classification
- Kingdom: Animalia
- Phylum: Arthropoda
- Class: Insecta
- Order: Coleoptera
- Suborder: Polyphaga
- Infraorder: Staphyliniformia
- Family: Histeridae
- Tribe: Histerini
- Genus: Psiloscelis; Marseul, 1853

Genus of beetles

Psiloscelis is a genus of clown beetles in the family Histeridae. There are about 8 described species in Psiloscelis.

== Species ==
- Psiloscelis abnormalis Mann, 1924
- Psiloscelis albertensis Bousquet and Laplante, 2006
- Psiloscelis corrosa Casey, 1893
- Psiloscelis millepora Casey, 1916
- Psiloscelis perpunctata (J. L. LeConte, 1880)
- Psiloscelis planipes (J. L. LeConte, 1852)
- Psiloscelis repleta (J. E. LeConte, 1845)
- Psiloscelis subopaca (J. L. LeConte, 1863)
