= Strigister =

Scientific classification
- Kingdom: Animalia
- Phylum: Arthropoda
- Class: Insecta
- Order: Coleoptera
- Suborder: Polyphaga
- Infraorder: Staphyliniformia
- Family: Histeridae
- Tribe: Exosternini
- Genus: Strigister; Caterino, Tishechkin & Proudfoot, 2013

Genus of beetles

Strigister is a genus of clown beetles in the family Histeridae. There are at least two described species in Strigister.

== Species ==
These two species belong to the genus Strigister:

- Strigister simoni (Lewis, 1889)
- Strigister tecolotito Caterino, Tishechkin & Proudfoot, 2013
