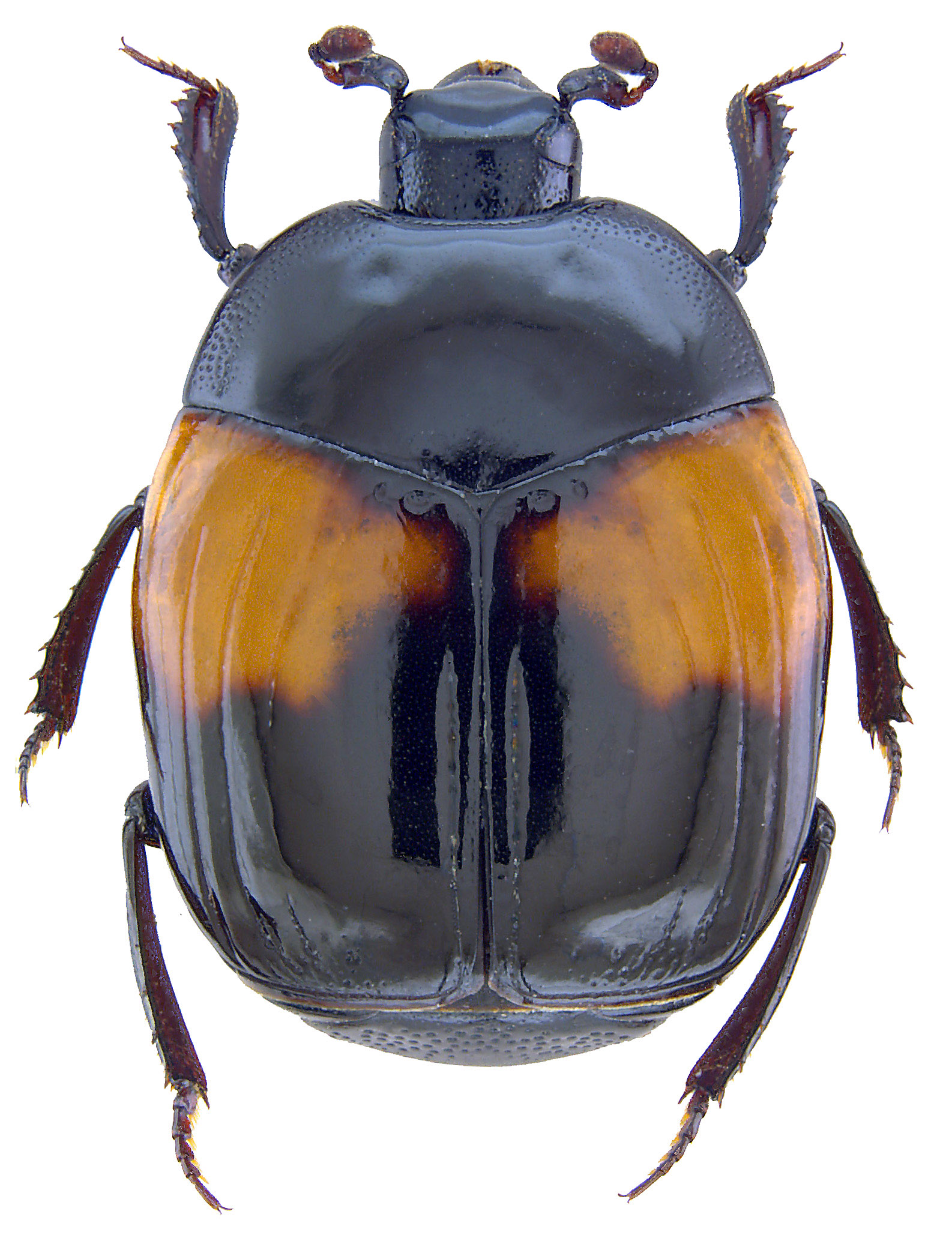
- Asolenus julietteae, Madagascar

Scientific classification
- Kingdom: Animalia
- Phylum: Arthropoda
- Class: Insecta
- Order: Coleoptera
- Suborder: Polyphaga
- Infraorder: Staphyliniformia
- Family: Histeridae
- Subfamily: Histerinae
- Tribe: Omalodini; Kryzhanovskij, 1972

= Omalodini =

Tribe of beetles

Omalodini is a small tribe of clown beetles in the family Histeridae. There are at least 2 genera and more than 60 described species in Omalodini.

== Genera ==
These two genera belong to the tribe Omalodini:

- Ebonius Lewis, 1885
- Omalodes Erichson, 1834
