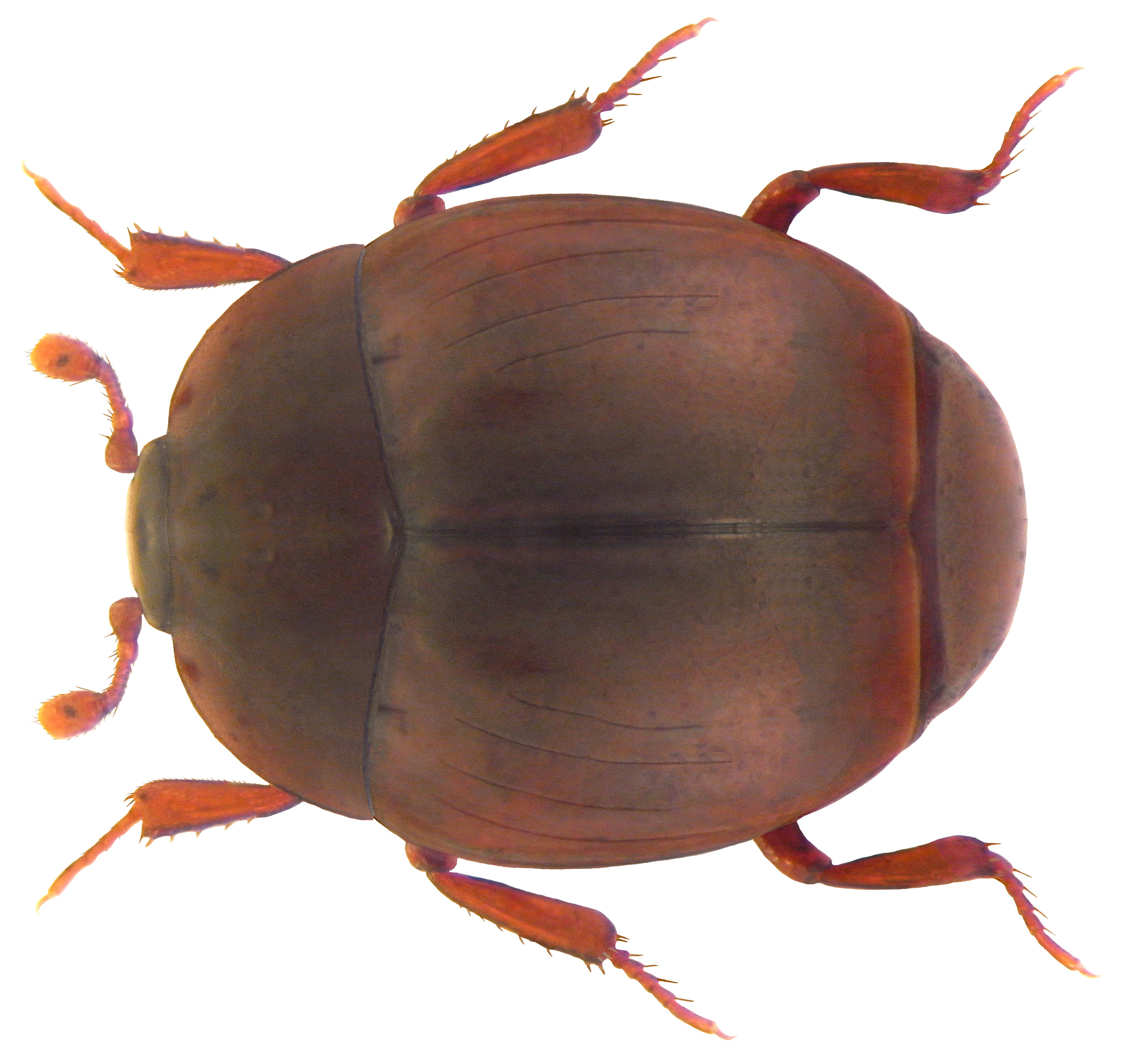
- Myrmetes paykulli

Scientific classification
- Kingdom: Animalia
- Phylum: Arthropoda
- Class: Insecta
- Order: Coleoptera
- Suborder: Polyphaga
- Infraorder: Staphyliniformia
- Family: Histeridae
- Genus: Myrmetes; Marseul, 1862

= Myrmetes =

Genus of beetles

Myrmetes is a genus of beetles belonging to the family Histeridae.

The species of this genus are found in Europe.

Species:

- Myrmetes paykulli Kanaar, 1979
