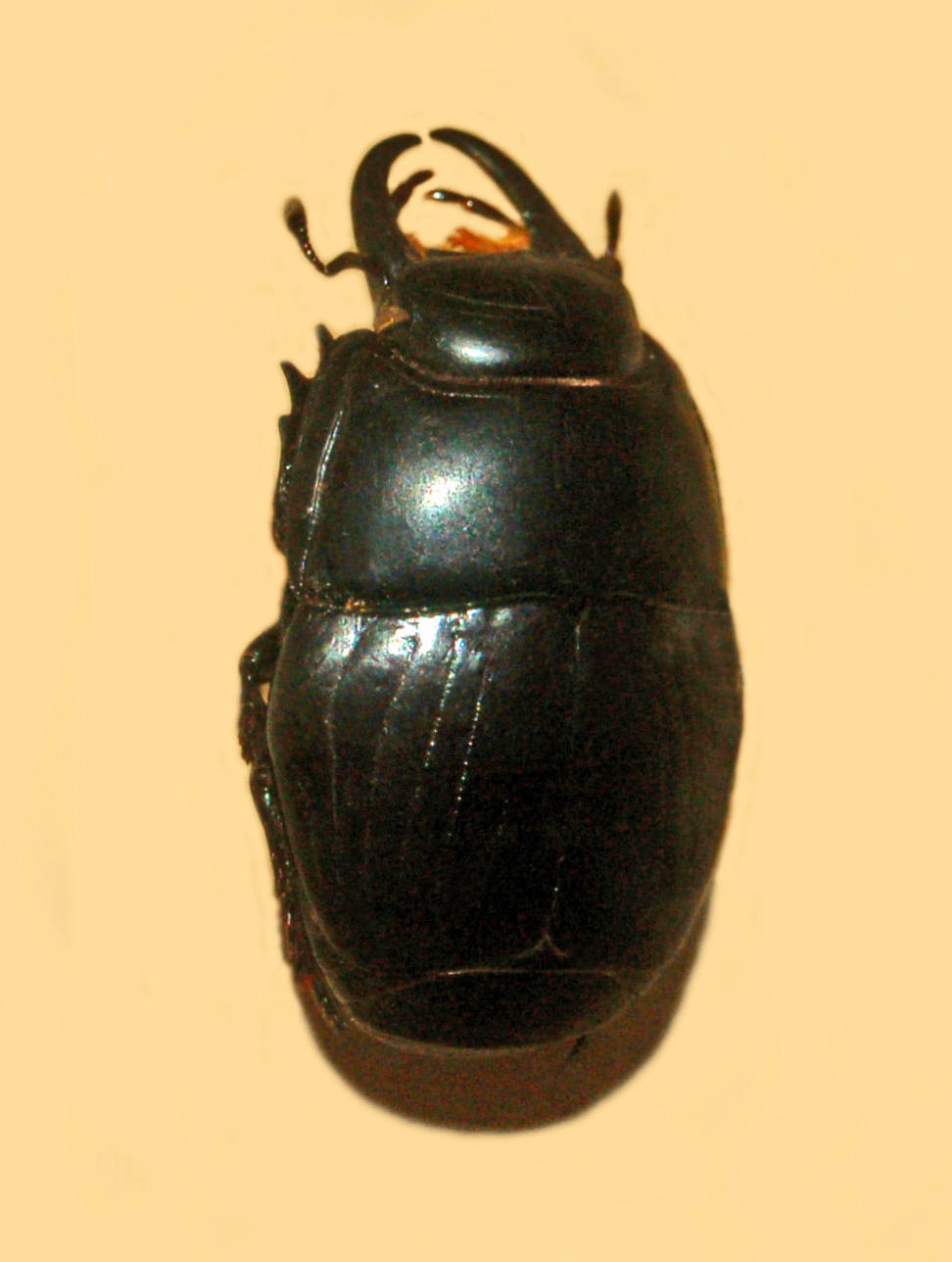
- Pactolinus gigas

Scientific classification
- Kingdom: Animalia
- Phylum: Arthropoda
- Clade: Pancrustacea
- Class: Insecta
- Order: Coleoptera
- Suborder: Polyphaga
- Infraorder: Staphyliniformia
- Family: Histeridae
- Tribe: Histerini
- Genus: Pactolinus; Motschulsky, 1860

Species
- (see text)

Synonyms
- Coptochilus Rey, 1888; Macrolister Lewis, 1904

= Pactolinus =

Genus of beetles

Pactolinus is a genus of the Histeridae family of Beetles

== Species ==
The genus contains the following species:

- Pactolinus arctus (Desbordes, 1914)
- Pactolinus collai Vienna, 2005
- Pactolinus fortis (Schmidt, 1889)
- Pactolinus gigas (Paykull, 1811)
- Pactolinus intrepidus (Lewis, 1897)
- Pactolinus latilabris (Lewis 1911)
- Pactolinus latipes (Palisot de Beauvois, 1805)
- Pactolinus major (Linnaeus 1767)
- Pactolinus maurus (Marseul, 1854)
- Pactolinus robusticeps (Marseul, 1886)
- Pactolinus robusticollis (Lewis, 1892)
- Pactolinus saginatus (Lewis, 1899)
- Pactolinus togoensis (Bickhardt, 1918)
- Pactolinus transvaalensis Gomy, 2001
