= Afrosoma =

Scientific classification
- Kingdom: Animalia
- Phylum: Arthropoda
- Class: Insecta
- Order: Coleoptera
- Suborder: Polyphaga
- Infraorder: Staphyliniformia
- Family: Histeridae
- Genus: Afrosoma; Mazur, 1999

Genus of leaf beetles

Afrosoma is a genus of beetles belonging to the family Histeridae.

The species of this genus are found in Southern Africa.

Species:

- Afrosoma capense (Wiedemann, 1821)
- Afrosoma castanipes (Marseul, 1853)
- Afrosoma servulum (Lewis, 1897)
