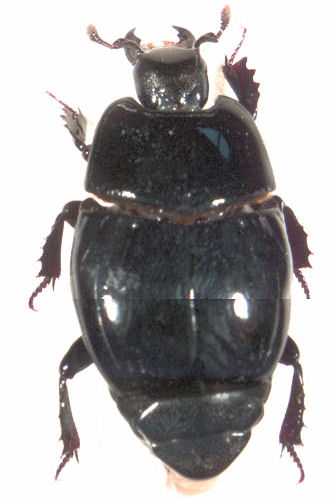
- Aulacosternus zelandicus male.jpg

Scientific classification
- Domain: Eukaryota
- Kingdom: Animalia
- Phylum: Arthropoda
- Class: Insecta
- Order: Coleoptera
- Suborder: Polyphaga
- Infraorder: Staphyliniformia
- Family: Histeridae
- Genus: Aulacosternus; Marseul, 1853

= Aulacosternus =

Genus of beetles

Aulacosternus is a genus of beetles belonging to the family Histeridae.

The species of this genus are found in New Zealand.

Species:

- Aulacosternus caledoniae (Fauvel, 1891)
- Aulacosternus zelandicus Marseul, 1853
- Sternaulax laevis Sharp, 1876
