= Nagelius =

Scientific classification
- Kingdom: Animalia
- Phylum: Arthropoda
- Class: Insecta
- Order: Coleoptera
- Suborder: Polyphaga
- Infraorder: Staphyliniformia
- Family: Histeridae
- Genus: Nagelius; Lewis, 1909

Genus of insects

Nagelius is a genus of beetles belonging to the family Histeridae.

Species:

- Nagelius carinicollis (Lewis, 1893)
- Nagelius castelnaudi (Marseul, 1870)
- Nagelius limatulus (Lewis, 1892)
- Nagelius turgidulus Mazur, 2007
