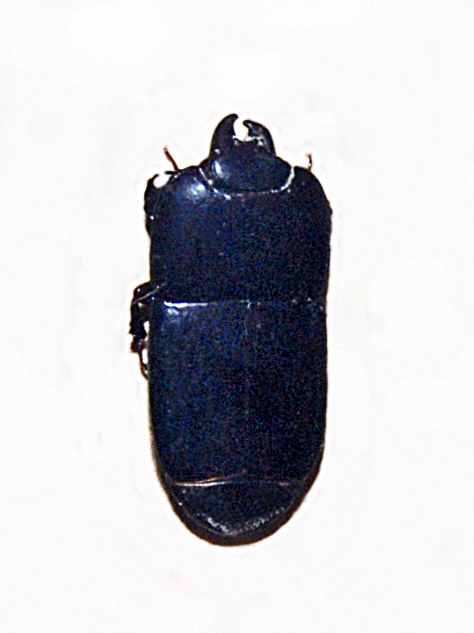
- Platylister foliaceus

Scientific classification
- Kingdom: Animalia
- Phylum: Arthropoda
- Class: Insecta
- Order: Coleoptera
- Suborder: Polyphaga
- Infraorder: Staphyliniformia
- Family: Histeridae
- Genus: Platylister; Lewis, 1892

Synonyms
- Platysoma (Platylister) Lewis, 1892

= Platylister =

Genus of beetles

Platylister is a genus of clown beetles belonging to the family Histeridae.

== Species ==
- Platylister abruptus
- Platylister alexandri
- Platylister algiricus
- Platylister andamanensis
- Platylister angolensis
- Platylister arcuatus
- Platylister atratus
- Platylister bimarginatus
- Platylister birmanus
- Platylister bonvouloiri
- Platylister borneolus
- Platylister cambodjensis
- Platylister canalicollis
- Platylister castetsi
- Platylister cathayi
- Platylister cavicauda
- Platylister charrali
- Platylister comes
- Platylister confucii
- Platylister congoensis
- Platylister contiguus
- Platylister corticinus
- Platylister cribropygus
- Platylister dahdah
- Platylister decipiens
- Platylister densatus
- Platylister desinens
- Platylister diffusus
- Platylister doriae
- Platylister emptus
- Platylister enodis
- Platylister fallaciosus
- Platylister foliaceus
- Platylister foveolatus
- Platylister friederichsi
- Platylister frontosus
- Platylister habitus
- Platylister hatamensis
- Platylister horni
- Platylister humilis
- Platylister insuliculus
- Platylister jobiensis
- Platylister kempi
- Platylister lignarius
- Platylister lucifigus
- Platylister luzonicus
- Platylister maculatus
- Platylister makassariensis
- Platylister malaicus
- Platylister murrayi
- Platylister nemoralis
- Platylister oberthuri
- Platylister odiosus
- Platylister ovatus
- Platylister pacificus
- Platylister palonensis
- Platylister patruus
- Platylister perroudi
- Platylister persimilis
- Platylister pini
- Platylister placitus
- Platylister pluvialis
- Platylister podagrus
- Platylister querulus
- Platylister ramoicola
- Platylister roberstorfi
- Platylister rosselensis
- Platylister sarawakensis
- Platylister sexstriatus
- Platylister simeani
- Platylister soronensis
- Platylister sororius
- Platylister strangulatus
- Platylister strialis
- Platylister striatiderus
- Platylister sulcisternus
- Platylister sumatrensis
- Platylister suturalis
- Platylister tenuimargo
- Platylister timoriensis
- Platylister unicus
- Platylister vanus
