= Sibelia =

Scientific classification
- Kingdom: Animalia
- Phylum: Arthropoda
- Class: Insecta
- Order: Coleoptera
- Suborder: Polyphaga
- Infraorder: Staphyliniformia
- Family: Histeridae
- Genus: Sibelia; Mazur & Ôhara, 2009
- Species: S. coreana

Binomial name
- Sibelia coreana (Ôhara & Jong-Cheol Paik, 1998)

Genus of beetles

Sibelia is a genus of clown beetles in the family Histeridae. GBIF lists just one species in the genus: Sibelia coreana (Ôhara & Jong-Cheol Paik, 1998).

The genus, Sibelia, was first described in 2009 by Slawomir Mazur and Masahiro Ôhara.

The species, Sibelia coreana, a beetle which is endemic to Korea, was first described in 1998 as Eblisia coreana by.Ôhara and Paik.
