= Acrolister =

Scientific classification
- Domain: Eukaryota
- Kingdom: Animalia
- Phylum: Arthropoda
- Class: Insecta
- Order: Coleoptera
- Suborder: Polyphaga
- Infraorder: Staphyliniformia
- Family: Histeridae
- Genus: Acrolister; Bickhardt, 1917

Genus of beetles

Acrolister is a genus of beetles belonging to the family Histeridae.

Species:

- Acrolister congoensis Lundgren, 1991
- Acrolister garambae Thérond, 1959
- Acrolister kleinei Bickhardt, 1918
