= Omalodes =

Scientific classification
- Kingdom: Animalia
- Phylum: Arthropoda
- Class: Insecta
- Order: Coleoptera
- Suborder: Polyphaga
- Infraorder: Staphyliniformia
- Family: Histeridae
- Tribe: Omalodini
- Genus: Omalodes; Erichson, 1834

Genus of beetles

Omalodes is a genus of clown beetles in the family Histeridae. There are more than 60 described species in Omalodes.

== Species ==
These 68 species belong to the genus Omalodes:

- Omalodes amazonius Marseul, 1861
- Omalodes angelo Moura, Leivas & Caneparo, 2016
- Omalodes angulatus (Fabricius, 1801)
- Omalodes anthracinus Marseul, 1853
- Omalodes areolatus Schmidt, 1889
- Omalodes atacamanus Leivas & Degallier, 2015
- Omalodes bifoveolatus Marseul, 1853
- Omalodes binodulus (Lewis, 1910)
- Omalodes bisulcatus Desbordes, 1919
- Omalodes brevisternus Schmidt, 1893
- Omalodes bullatus Lewis, 1905
- Omalodes cerqueirae Desbordes, 1919
- Omalodes chapadae Lewis, 1908
- Omalodes clavulus Lewis, 1888
- Omalodes consanguineus Marseul, 1853
- Omalodes depressisternus Marseul, 1853
- Omalodes ebeninus Erichson, 1834
- Omalodes extorris Marseul, 1853
- Omalodes exul Marseul, 1853
- Omalodes fassli Bickhardt, 1911
- Omalodes faustus Erichson, 1834
- Omalodes felix Lewis, 1900
- Omalodes fortunatus Lewis, 1898
- Omalodes foveola Erichson, 1834
- Omalodes gagatinus Erichson, 1847
- Omalodes grossus Marseul, 1853
- Omalodes haitianus Marseul, 1853
- Omalodes humerosus Schmidt, 1889
- Omalodes intermedius (Lewis, 1907)
- Omalodes kovariki Moura, Leivas & Caneparo, 2016
- Omalodes laceratus Marseul, 1853
- Omalodes laevicollis Bickhardt, 1911
- Omalodes laevigatus (Quensel, 1806)
- Omalodes laevinotus Marseul, 1853
- Omalodes lapsans Marseul, 1861
- Omalodes lubricans Casey
- Omalodes lucidus Erichson, 1834
- Omalodes marquisicus Marseul, 1853
- Omalodes marseuli Schmidt, 1889
- Omalodes mazuri Moura & De Almeida, 2013
- Omalodes mendax Marseul, 1861
- Omalodes mestino Lewis, 1904
- Omalodes monilifer Marseul, 1853
- Omalodes novus Marseul, 1853
- Omalodes obliquistrius Lewis, 1908
- Omalodes omega (Kirby, 1818)
- Omalodes optatus Lewis, 1911
- Omalodes perpolitus Schmidt, 1893
- Omalodes planifrons Marseul, 1853
- Omalodes praevius Marseul, 1861
- Omalodes pulvinatus Erichson, 1834
- Omalodes punctistrius Marseul, 1853
- Omalodes punctulatus Moura & De Almeida, 2013
- Omalodes rivus Moura & De Almeida, 2013
- Omalodes ruficlavis Marseul, 1853
- Omalodes serenus Erichson, 1834
- Omalodes seriatus Schmidt, 1889
- Omalodes simplex Lewis, 1908
- Omalodes sinuaticollis Marseul, 1853
- Omalodes sobrinus Erichson, 1834
- Omalodes soulouquii Marseul, 1861
- Omalodes tuberculatus Lewis, 1905
- Omalodes tuberculifer Desbordes, 1917
- Omalodes tuberculipygus Schmidt, 1889
- Omalodes tuberosus Lewis, 1889
- Omalodes vapulo Marseul, 1861
- Omalodes vitreolucens Casey
- Omalodes wagneri Desbordes, 1919
