= Notodoma =

Scientific classification
- Domain: Eukaryota
- Kingdom: Animalia
- Phylum: Arthropoda
- Class: Insecta
- Order: Coleoptera
- Suborder: Polyphaga
- Infraorder: Staphyliniformia
- Family: Histeridae
- Genus: Notodoma; Lacordaire, 1854

Genus of insects

Notodoma is a genus of beetles belonging to the family Histeridae.

The species of this genus are found in Southeastern Asia, including Japan.

Species:

- Notodoma fungorum Lewis, 1884
- Notodoma globatum Marseul, 1855
- Notodoma lewisi Reitter, 1910
- Notodoma rufulum Lewis, 1892
- Notodoma solstitiale Lewis, 1892
- Notodoma strigosulum Cooman, 1938
