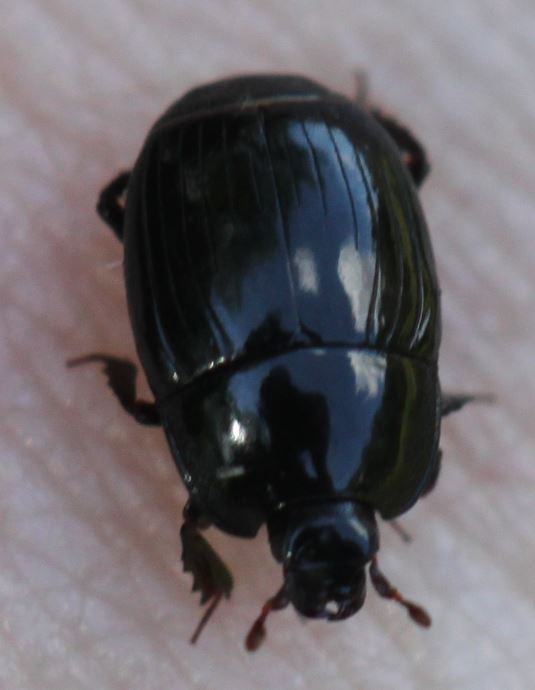
- Eblisia minor

Scientific classification
- Domain: Eukaryota
- Kingdom: Animalia
- Phylum: Arthropoda
- Class: Insecta
- Order: Coleoptera
- Suborder: Polyphaga
- Infraorder: Staphyliniformia
- Family: Histeridae
- Genus: Eblisia; Lewis, 1889

= Eblisia =

Genus of beetles

Eblisia is a genus of beetles belonging to the family Histeridae.

The genus has almost cosmopolitan distribution.

Species:

- Eblisia bennigseni Bickhardt, 1912
- Eblisia bicincta Cooman, 1941
