= Iliotona =

Scientific classification
- Kingdom: Animalia
- Phylum: Arthropoda
- Class: Insecta
- Order: Coleoptera
- Suborder: Polyphaga
- Infraorder: Staphyliniformia
- Family: Histeridae
- Tribe: Hololeptini
- Genus: Iliotona; Carnochan, 1917

Genus of beetles

Iliotona is a genus of clown beetles in the family Histeridae. There are about five described species in Iliotona.

== Species ==
These five species belong to the genus Iliotona:

- Iliotona beyeri (Schaefer, 1907)
- Iliotona cacti (J. L. LeConte, 1851)
- Iliotona dorcoides (Lewis, 1888)
- Iliotona gilli Sokolov & Tishechkin, 2010
- Iliotona markushevae Sokolov, 2005
