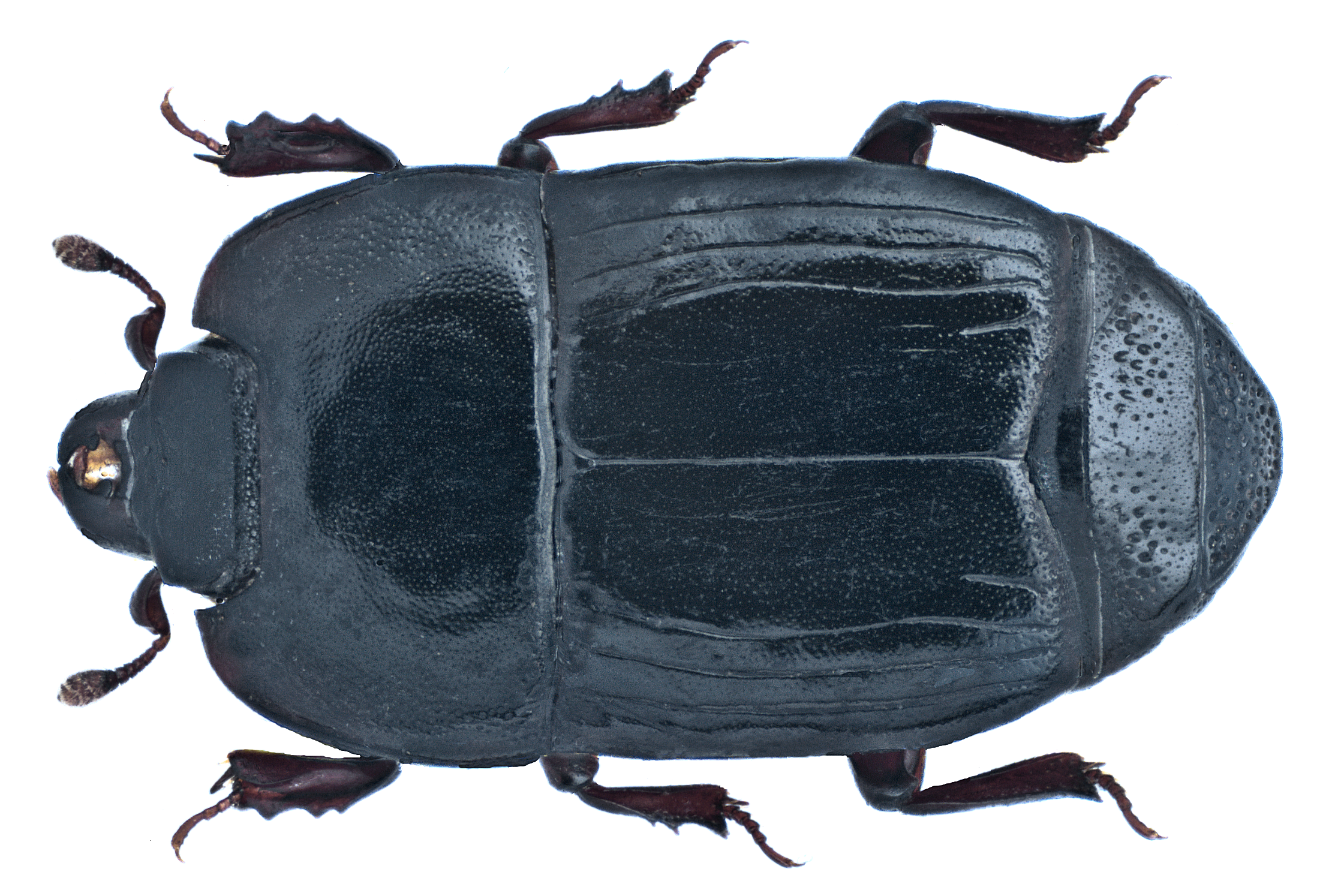
- Apobletes schaumei

Scientific classification
- Kingdom: Animalia
- Phylum: Arthropoda
- Class: Insecta
- Order: Coleoptera
- Suborder: Polyphaga
- Infraorder: Staphyliniformia
- Family: Histeridae
- Subfamily: Histerinae
- Tribe: Platysomatini; Bickhardt, 1914

= Platysomatini =

Tribe of beetles

Platysomatini is a tribe of clown beetles in the family Histeridae. There are at least 30 genera and 380 described species in Platysomatini.

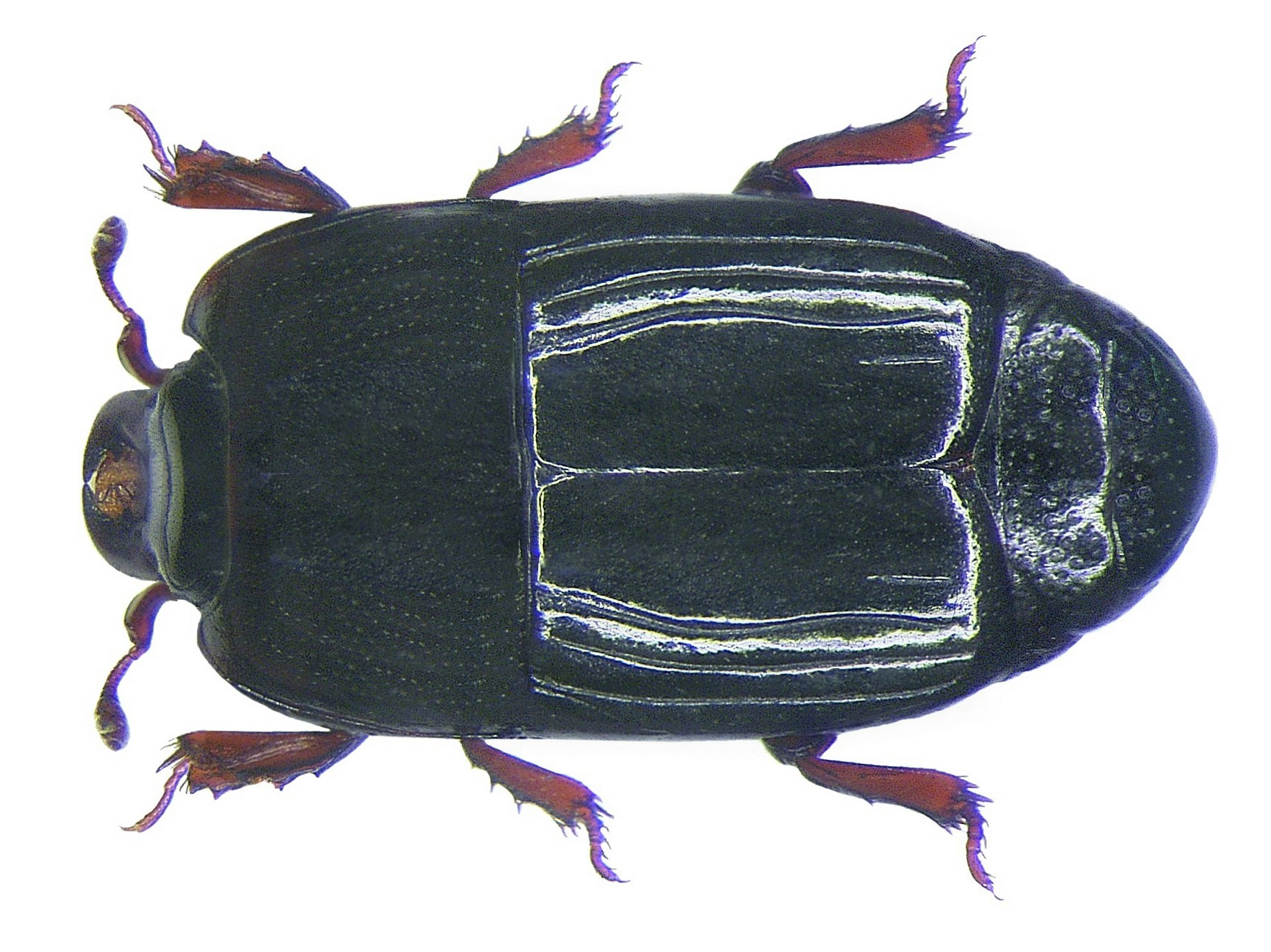
Platysoma moluccanum

== See also ==
For a list of genera in this tribe, see List of Histerinae genera
