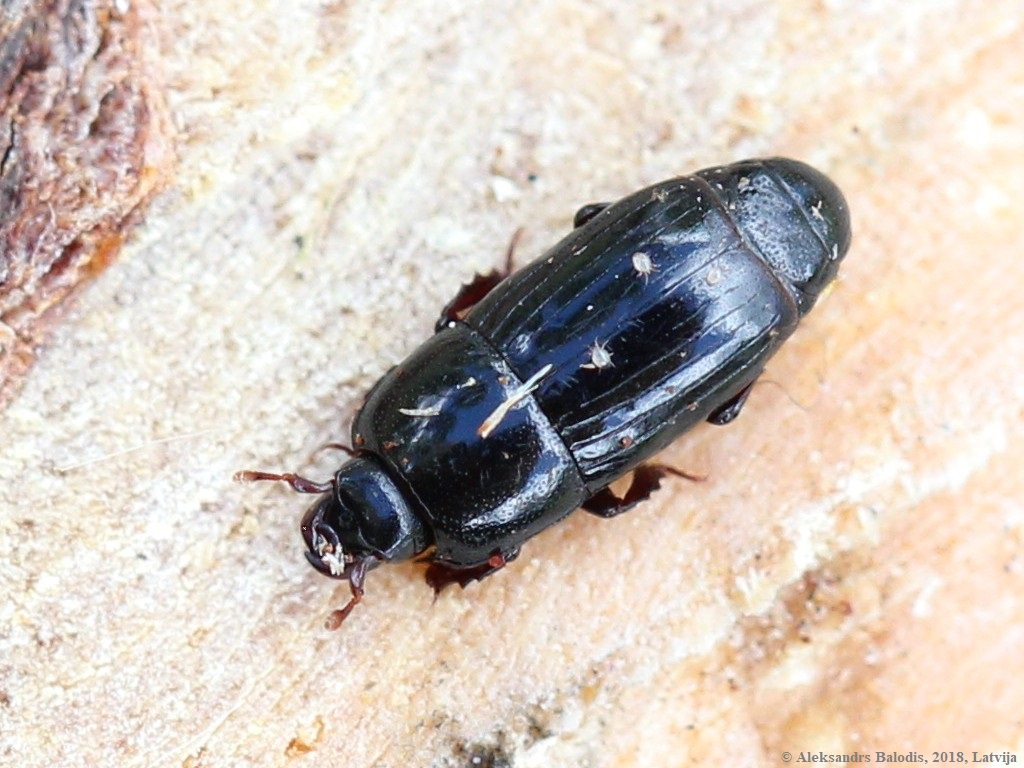
- Platysoma angustatum

Scientific classification
- Kingdom: Animalia
- Phylum: Arthropoda
- Clade: Pancrustacea
- Class: Insecta
- Order: Coleoptera
- Suborder: Polyphaga
- Infraorder: Staphyliniformia
- Family: Histeridae
- Subfamily: Histerinae; Gyllenhal, 1808

Tribes
- Exosternini Bickhardt, 1914; Histerini Gyllenhal, 1808; Hololeptini Hope, 1840; Omalodini Kryzhanovskij, 1972; Platysomatini Bickhardt, 1914

Diversity
- at least 140 genera

= Histerinae =

Subfamily of beetles

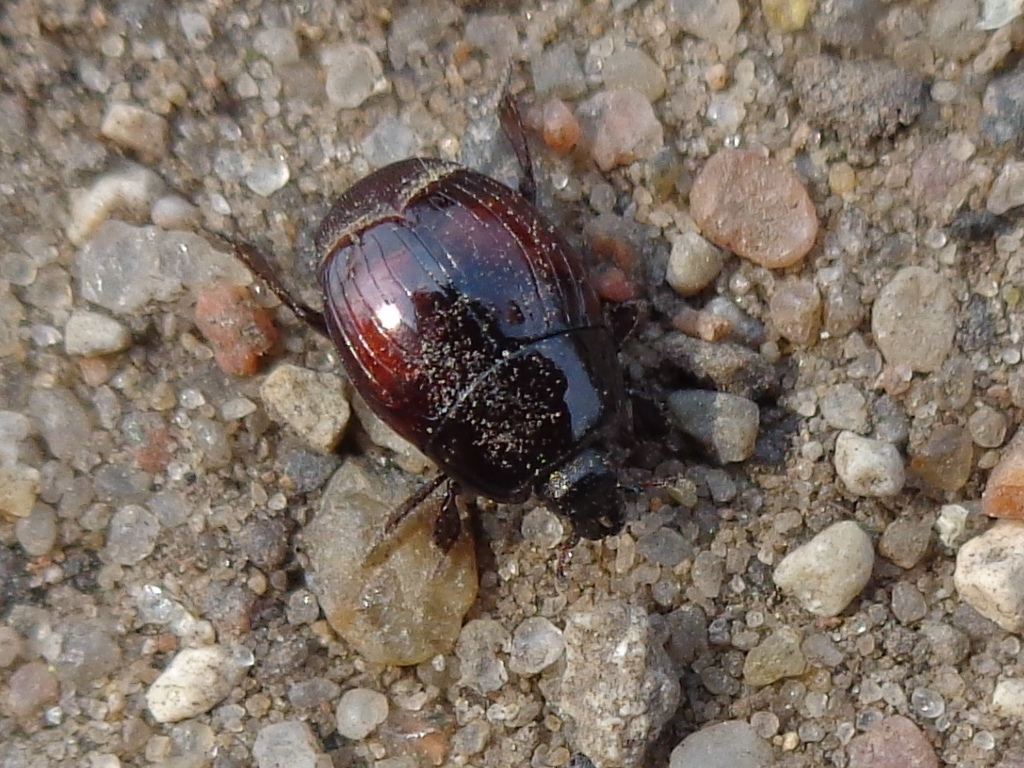
Margarinotus purpurascens

Histerinae is a subfamily of clown beetles in the family Histeridae. There are more than 140 genera and 2,000 described species in Histerinae.

== See also ==
- List of Histerinae genera
