= Operclipygus =

Scientific classification
- Kingdom: Animalia
- Phylum: Arthropoda
- Class: Insecta
- Order: Coleoptera
- Suborder: Polyphaga
- Infraorder: Staphyliniformia
- Family: Histeridae
- Tribe: Exosternini
- Genus: Operclipygus; Marseul, 1870

Synonyms
- Phelisteroides Wenzel & Dybas, 1941; Tribalister Horn, 1873

Genus of beetles

Operclipygus is a genus of hister beetle.

== Species ==
There are 177 species of Operclipygus. Therefore see:

- List of Operclipygus species
