= Baconia (beetle) =

Scientific classification
- Kingdom: Animalia
- Phylum: Arthropoda
- Class: Insecta
- Order: Coleoptera
- Suborder: Polyphaga
- Infraorder: Staphyliniformia
- Family: Histeridae
- Tribe: Exosternini
- Genus: Baconia; Lewis, 1885

Diversity
- at least 110 species

Synonyms
- Baconia (Binhister) Cooman, 1934

Genus of beetles

Baconia is a genus of clown beetles in the family Histeridae. There are at least 110 described species in Baconia.

== See also ==
- List of Baconia species
