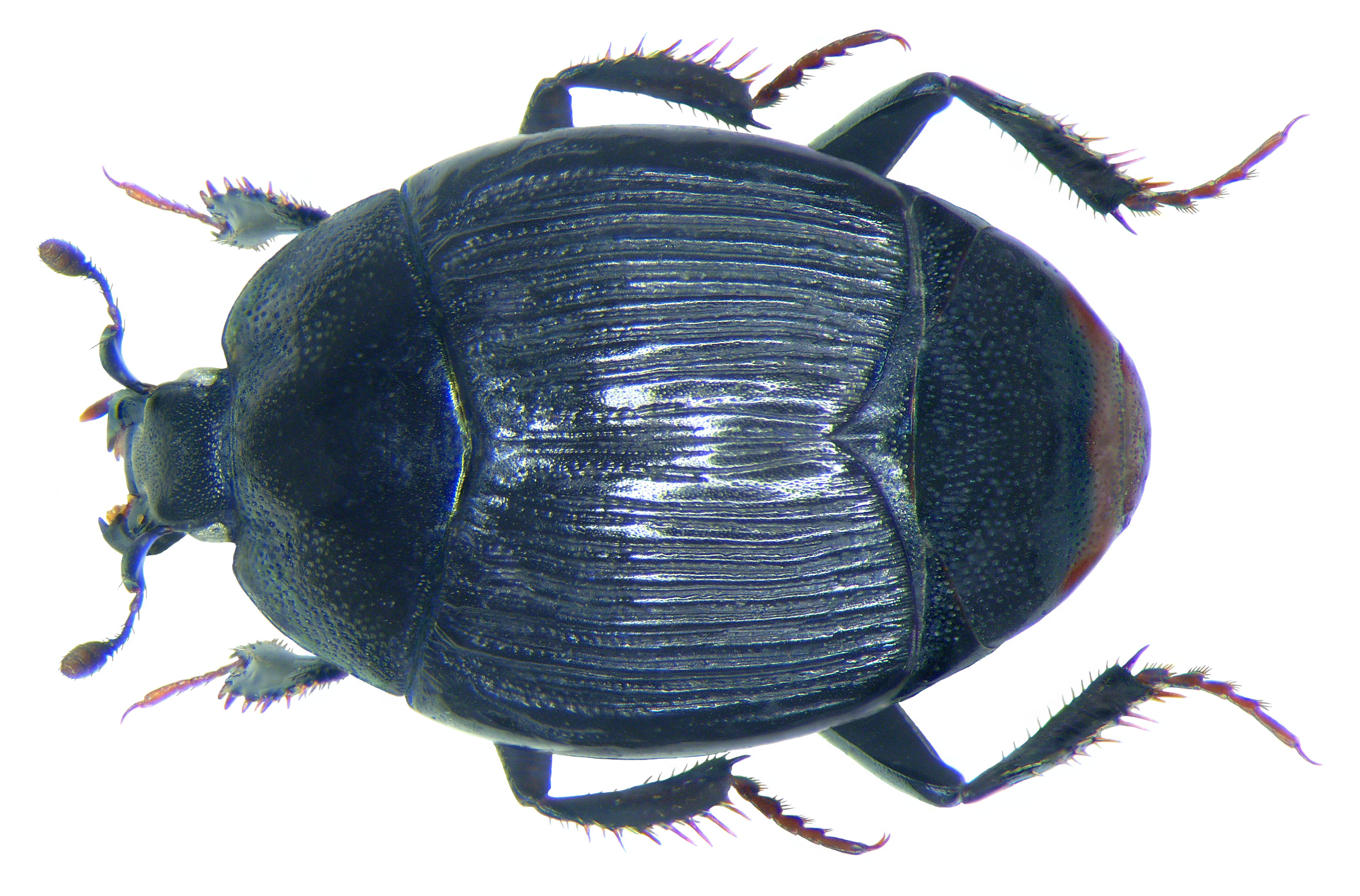
- Pelorurus densistriatus, Namibia

Scientific classification
- Kingdom: Animalia
- Phylum: Arthropoda
- Class: Insecta
- Order: Coleoptera
- Suborder: Polyphaga
- Infraorder: Staphyliniformia
- Family: Histeridae
- Subfamily: Histerinae
- Tribe: Exosternini; Bickhardt, 1914

= Exosternini =

Tribe of beetles

Exosternini is a tribe of clown beetles in the family Histeridae. There are at least 60 genera and 800 described species in Exosternini.

== See also ==
For a list of genera in this tribe, see List of Histerinae genera
