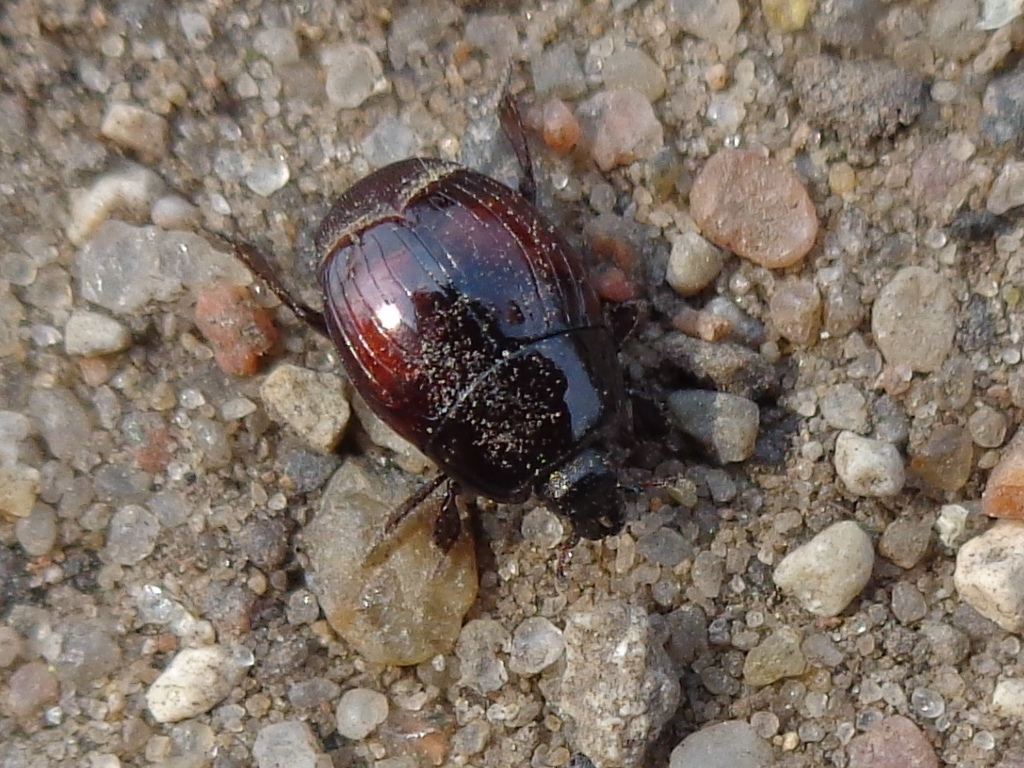
- Margarinotus purpurascens

Scientific classification
- Kingdom: Animalia
- Phylum: Arthropoda
- Class: Insecta
- Order: Coleoptera
- Suborder: Polyphaga
- Infraorder: Staphyliniformia
- Family: Histeridae
- Subfamily: Histerinae
- Tribe: Histerini; Gyllenhal, 1808

= Histerini =

Tribe of beetles

Histerini is a tribe of clown beetles in the family Histeridae. There are at least 540 described species in Histerini.

== See also ==
- List of Histerinae genera
