= List of Margarinotus species =

This is a list of 111 species in the genus Margarinotus.

== Margarinotus species ==
- Margarinotus agnatus (Lewis, 1884)
- Margarinotus aoudicus (Marseul, 1861)
- Margarinotus arrosor (Bickhardt, 1920)
- Margarinotus atamuradovi Kryzhanovskij, 1993
- Margarinotus babai Ôhara, 1999
- Margarinotus bickhardti (Reitter, 1910)
- Margarinotus bicolor Mazur, 1993
- Margarinotus binotatus (Erichson, 1834)
- Margarinotus bipustulatus (Schrank, 1781)
- Margarinotus birmanus Lundgren in Johnson et al., 1991
- Margarinotus boleti (Lewis, 1884)
- Margarinotus brunneus (Fabricius, 1775)
- Margarinotus bueckingi (Bickhardt, 1918)
- Margarinotus cadavericola (Bickhardt, 1920)
- Margarinotus carbonarius (Hoffmann, 1803)
- Margarinotus cognatus (J. E. LeConte, 1844)
- Margarinotus confusus Wenzel, 1944
- Margarinotus curvicollis (Bickhardt, 1913)
- Margarinotus davisi (Schaeffer, 1908)
- Margarinotus distinctus (Erichson, 1834)
- Margarinotus ednae (Carnochan, 1915)
- Margarinotus egregius (Casey, 1916)
- Margarinotus ephemeralis Caterino, 2010
- Margarinotus faedatus (J. E. LeConte, 1845)
- Margarinotus faldermanni (Marseul, 1861)
- Margarinotus felipae (Lewis, 1901)
- Margarinotus fenderi Wenzel, 1960
- Margarinotus formosanus Ôhara, 1999
- Margarinotus fractifrons (Casey, 1893)
- Margarinotus fractistrius (Lewis, 1906)
- Margarinotus fragosus (Lewis, 1892)
- Margarinotus gardneri (Desbordes, 1930)
- Margarinotus graecus (Brullé, 1832)
- Margarinotus gratiosus (Mannerheim, 1852)
- Margarinotus guttifer Horn, 1862
- Margarinotus hailar Wenzel, 1944
- Margarinotus harrisii (Kirby, 1837)
- Margarinotus hudsonicus (Casey, 1893)
- Margarinotus ignobilis (Marseul, 1854)
- Margarinotus immunis (Erichson, 1834)
- Margarinotus impiger (Lewis, 1905)
- Margarinotus incognitus (Marseul, 1854)
- Margarinotus indiicola (Desbordes, 1919)
- Margarinotus integer (C. Brisout, 1866)
- Margarinotus interruptus (Palisot de Beauvois, 1805)
- Margarinotus jenisi Olexa, 1995
- Margarinotus kabakovi Kryzhanovskij, 1980
- Margarinotus kathmandu Mazur, 1984
- Margarinotus koenigi (Schmidt, 1888)
- Margarinotus koltzei (Schmidt, 1889)
- Margarinotus kurbatovi (Tishechkin, 1992)
- Margarinotus kurdistanus (Marseul, 1857)
- Margarinotus laevifossa (Schmidt, 1890)
- Margarinotus lecontei Wenzel, 1944
- Margarinotus longus (Bickhardt, 1910)
- Margarinotus maja Mazur, 2013
- Margarinotus marginatus (Erichson, 1834)
- Margarinotus marginepunctatus (Lewis, 1879)
- Margarinotus marginicollis (J. E. LeConte, 1845)
- Margarinotus maruyamai Ôhara, 1999
- Margarinotus mateui (Thérond, 1964)
- Margarinotus merdarius (Hoffmann, 1803)
- Margarinotus mirabilis (Khnzorian, 1959)
- Margarinotus mormon (Casey, 1893)
- Margarinotus multidens (Schmidt, 1889)
- Margarinotus navus (Marseul, 1854)
- Margarinotus neglectus (Germar, 1813)
- Margarinotus nilgirianus (Desbordes, 1920)
- Margarinotus niponicus (Lewis, 1895)
- Margarinotus oblitus (Casey, 1916)
- Margarinotus oblongulus (Schmidt, 1892)
- Margarinotus obscurus (Kugelann, 1792)
- Margarinotus occidentalis (Lewis, 1885)
- Margarinotus osawai Ôhara, 1999
- Margarinotus periphaerus Mazur, 2003
- Margarinotus planiceps (Lewis, 1888)
- Margarinotus pluto (Casey, 1893)
- Margarinotus prometheus (Kryzhanovskij, 1966)
- Margarinotus pseudomirabilis Kalashian, 1989
- Margarinotus punctiventer (Marseul, 1854)
- Margarinotus purpurascens (Herbst, 1792)
- Margarinotus rectus (Casey, 1916)
- Margarinotus reichardti Kryzhanovskij and Reichardt, 1976
- Margarinotus remotus (J. L. LeConte, 1859)
- Margarinotus ruficornis (Grimm, 1852)
- Margarinotus scaber (Fabricius, 1787)
- Margarinotus schneideri Kapler, 1996
- Margarinotus sexstriatus (J. L. LeConte, 1851)
- Margarinotus silantjevi (Shirjajev, 1903)
- Margarinotus sinuaticollis (Lewis, 1892)
- Margarinotus socius (Lewis, 1907)
- Margarinotus solskyi (Schmidt, 1890)
- Margarinotus stenocephalus (Lewis, 1892)
- Margarinotus stercoriger (Marseul, 1880)
- Margarinotus striola (Sahlberg, 1819)
- Margarinotus stygicus (J. E. LeConte, 1845)
- Margarinotus sutus (Lewis, 1884)
- Margarinotus taiwanus Mazur, 2008
- Margarinotus terricola (Germar, 1824)
- Margarinotus thai Mazur, 2003
- Margarinotus thomomysi Caterino, 2010
- Margarinotus tristriatus Wenzel, 1944
- Margarinotus umbilicatus (Casey, 1893)
- Margarinotus umbrosus (Casey, 1893)
- Margarinotus uncostriatus (Marseul, 1854)
- Margarinotus unus Mazur, 2007
- Margarinotus ventralis (Marseul, 1854)
- Margarinotus wenzelianus Kryzhanovskij and Reichardt, 1976
- Margarinotus weymarni Wenzel, 1944
- Margarinotus yezoensis Ôhara, 1989
