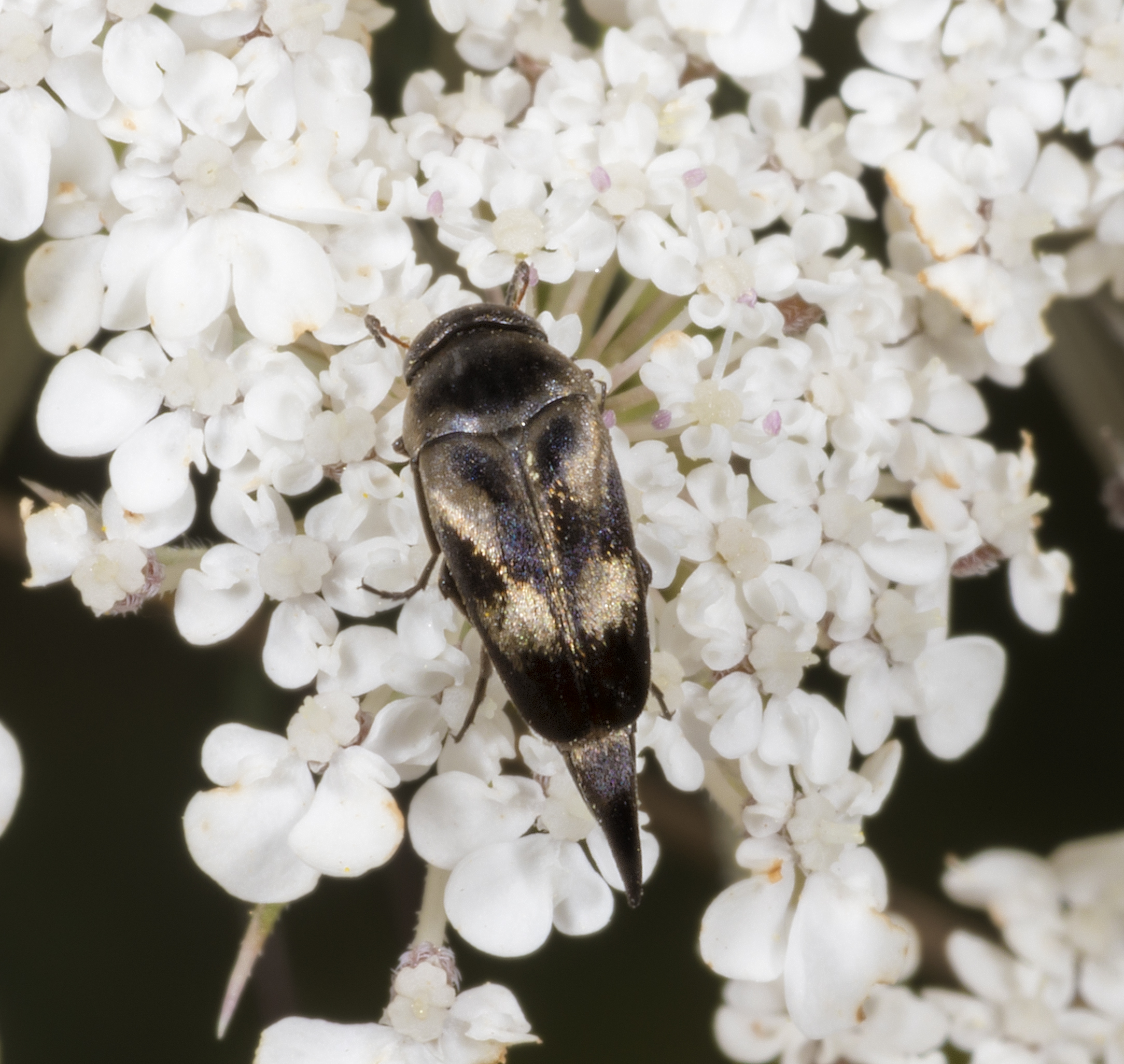
- Variimorda villosa

Scientific classification
- Kingdom: Animalia
- Phylum: Arthropoda
- Clade: Pancrustacea
- Class: Insecta
- Order: Coleoptera
- Suborder: Polyphaga
- Infraorder: Cucujiformia
- Family: Mordellidae
- Genus: Variimorda
- Subgenus: Variimorda; Méquignon, 1946

Type species
- Mordella fasciata Fabricius, 1775

= Variimorda (subgenus) =

Subgenus of beetles

Variimorda is a subgenus of beetles in the family Mordellidae, containing the following species:

== Species ==
- Variimorda argyropleura (Franciscolo, 1942)
- Variimorda basalis (Costa, 1854)
- Variimorda briantea (Comolli, 1837)
- Variimorda flavimana (Marseul, 1876)
- Variimorda holzschuhi Horák, 1985
- Variimorda ihai Chûjô, 1959
- Variimorda inomatai Takakuwa, 1985
- Variimorda ishiharai Kiyoyama, 1994
- Variimorda kurosawai Takakuwa, 2001
- Variimorda mendax Méquignon, 1946
- Variimorda persica Horák, 1985
- Variimorda quomoi (Franciscolo, 1942)
- Variimorda ragusai (Emery, 1876)
- Variimorda shiyakei Horak, 1996
- Variimorda truncatopyga (Pic, 1938)
- Variimorda villosa (Schrank, 1781)
