= Plegaderus barbelini =

Scientific classification
- Kingdom: Animalia
- Phylum: Arthropoda
- Class: Insecta
- Order: Coleoptera
- Suborder: Polyphaga
- Infraorder: Staphyliniformia
- Family: Histeridae
- Genus: Plegaderus
- Species: P. barbelini

Binomial name
- Plegaderus barbelini Marseul, 1862

Species of beetle

Plegaderus barbelini is a species of clown beetle in the family Histeridae. It is found in North America.
