= Plegaderus sayi =

Scientific classification
- Kingdom: Animalia
- Phylum: Arthropoda
- Class: Insecta
- Order: Coleoptera
- Suborder: Polyphaga
- Infraorder: Staphyliniformia
- Family: Histeridae
- Genus: Plegaderus
- Species: P. sayi

Binomial name
- Plegaderus sayi Marseul, 1856

Species of beetle

Plegaderus sayi is a species of clown beetle in the family Histeridae. It is found in North America.
