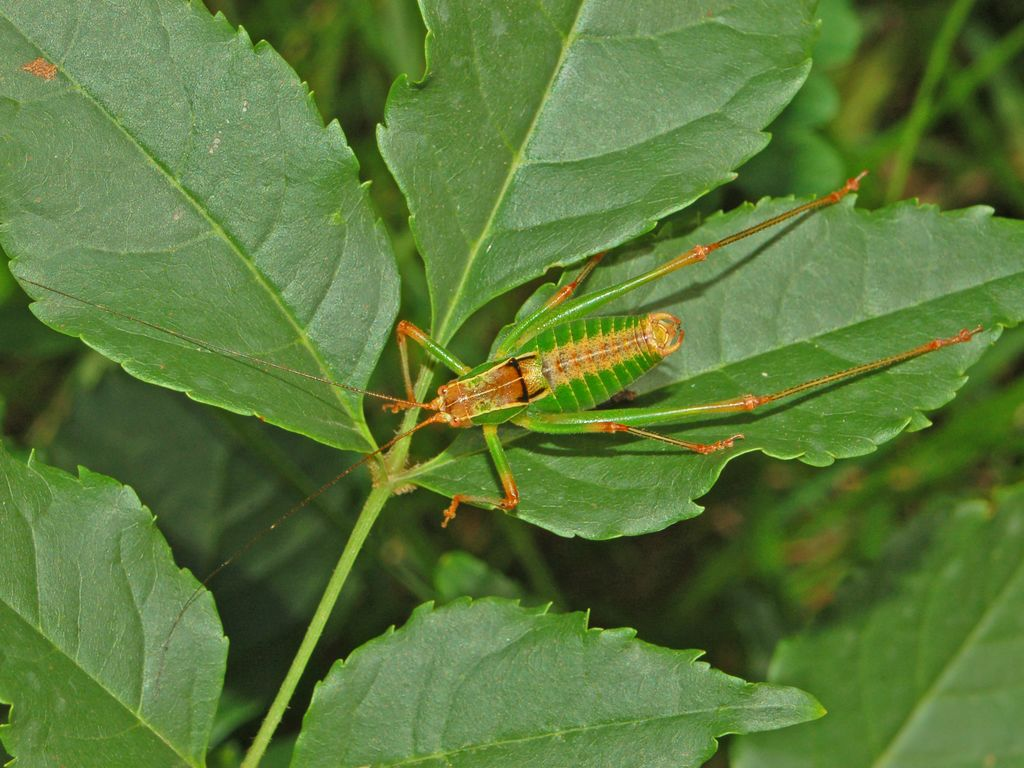
- Metaplastes pulchripennis, dorsal view

Scientific classification
- Kingdom: Animalia
- Phylum: Arthropoda
- Clade: Pancrustacea
- Class: Insecta
- Order: Orthoptera
- Suborder: Ensifera
- Family: Tettigoniidae
- Subfamily: Phaneropterinae
- Genus: Metaplastes
- Species: M. pulchripennis

Binomial name
- Metaplastes pulchripennis (A. Costa, 1863)

Synonyms
- Odontura pulchripennis Costa, A., 1863

= Metaplastes pulchripennis =

Species of cricket-like animal

Metaplastes pulchripennis, common name Italian ornate bush-cricket, is a species of 'katydids crickets' belonging to the family Tettigoniidae subfamily Phaneropterinae.

== Distribution and habitat ==
This species is present in mainland of Italy, in northern Sardinia, in Corsica, in northern Sicily and in northeastern Spain. It mainly inhabits woodlands along rivers, forest edges and flower-rich grasslands.

== Description ==
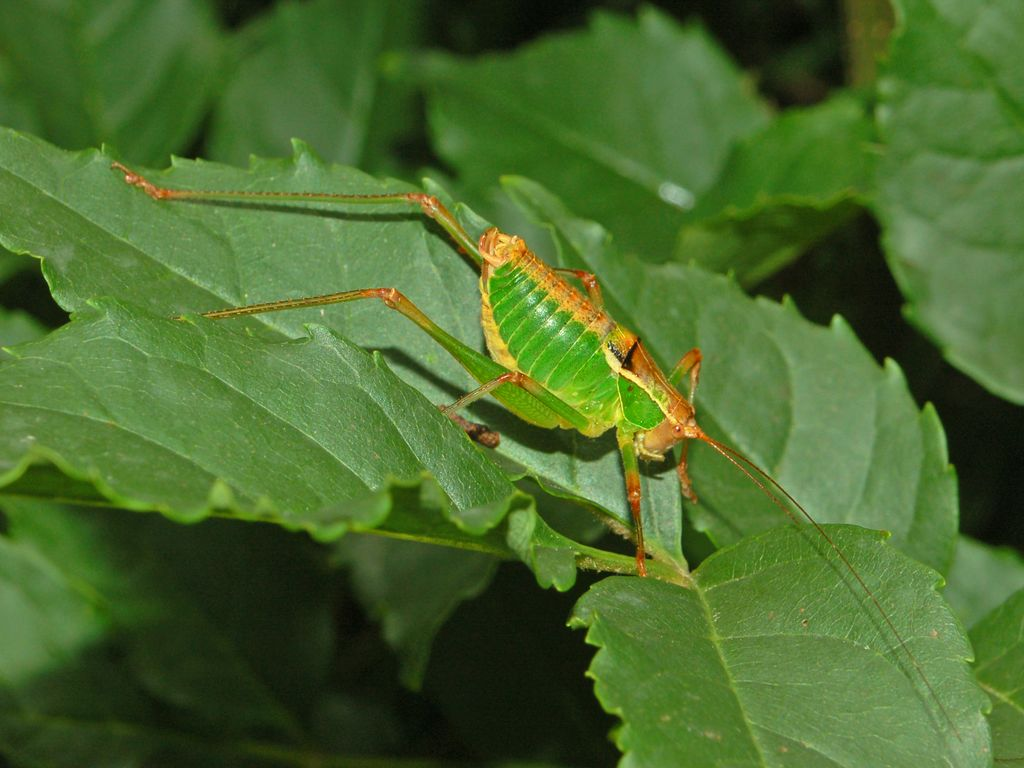
Metaplastes pulchripennis, male

The adults can reach 17–18 millimetres (0.67–0.71 in) of length. The basic coloration of the body is pale green, with a reddish-brown streak on the back. The legs are mainly green, with pale brown knees. The antennae are brown and very long. Ovipositor is quite short (9–10 millimetres (0.35–0.39 in)). Elytra of females are green, while in males they show a white outer edge, with a dark brown band on the edge. Metaplastes pulchripennis is quite similar to Barbistes species, but it can be distinguished by the cerci of the males and the more elongated pronotum.

== Biology ==
It can commonly be encountered from June through July, especially on Cistus and Rubus species.
