= Margarinotus cognatus =

Scientific classification
- Kingdom: Animalia
- Phylum: Arthropoda
- Clade: Pancrustacea
- Class: Insecta
- Order: Coleoptera
- Suborder: Polyphaga
- Infraorder: Staphyliniformia
- Family: Histeridae
- Genus: Margarinotus
- Species: M. cognatus

Binomial name
- Margarinotus cognatus (J. E. LeConte, 1844)

Species of beetle

Margarinotus cognatus is a species of clown beetle in the family Histeridae. It is found in North America.
