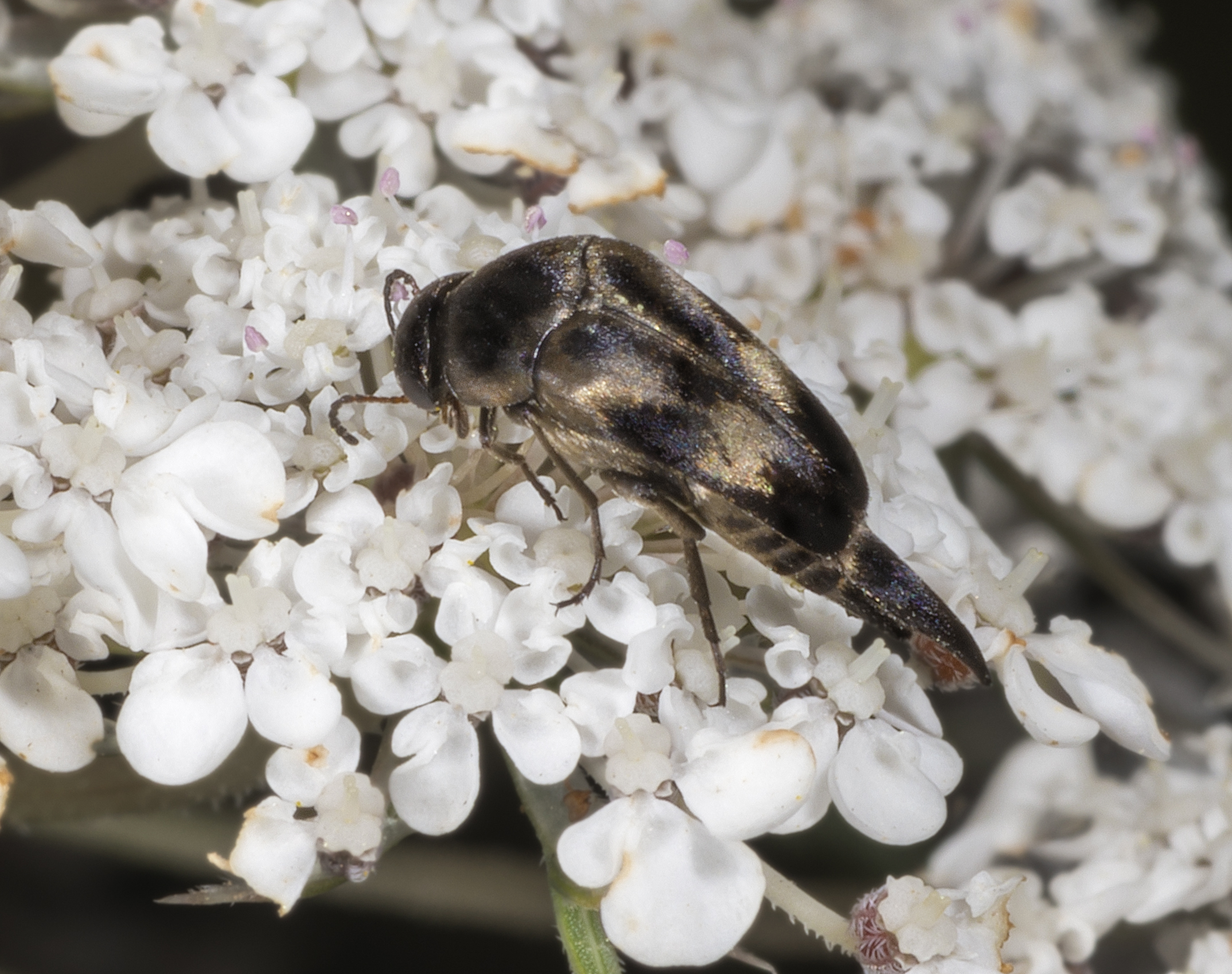
- Variimorda villosa, France

Scientific classification
- Domain: Eukaryota
- Kingdom: Animalia
- Phylum: Arthropoda
- Class: Insecta
- Order: Coleoptera
- Suborder: Polyphaga
- Infraorder: Cucujiformia
- Family: Mordellidae
- Subfamily: Mordellinae
- Tribe: Mordellini
- Genus: Variimorda; Méquignon, 1946

Type species
- Mordella fasciata Fabricius, 1775

Synonyms
- Galeimorda Horak, 1985; Sulcatimorda Mequignon, 1946

= Variimorda =

Genus of beetles

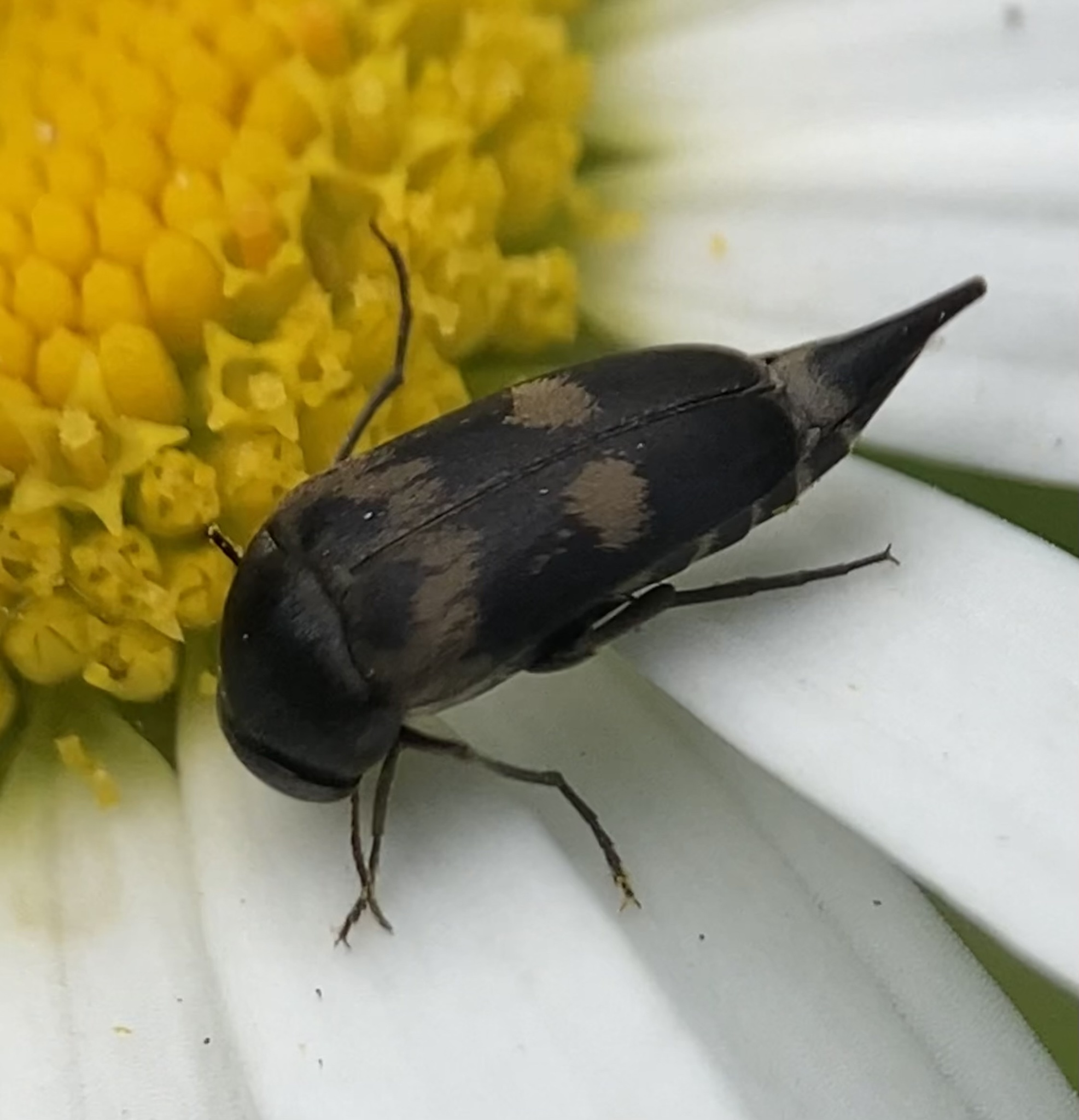
Variimorda villosa, Germany

Variimorda is a genus of tumbling flower beetles in the family Mordellidae. There are about 30 described species in Variimorda.

== Species ==
These 30 species belong to the genus Variimorda:

- Variimorda argyropleura (Franciscolo, 1942)
- Variimorda basalis (Costa, 1854) (Europe)
- Variimorda bistrinotata (Pic, 1928) (south and southeast Asia)
- Variimorda briantea (Comolli, 1837) (Europe)
- Variimorda caprai Franciscolo, 1951
- Variimorda fagniezi (Méquignon, 1946)
- Variimorda fagusai (Méquignon, 1946)
- Variimorda flavimana (Marseul, 1877) (temperate Asia)
- Variimorda girardi Horák, 2009 (India)
- Variimorda hiromiae Takakuwa, 2010 (Japan)
- Variimorda hladili Horak, 1985
- Variimorda holzschuhi Horak, 1985
- Variimorda ihai Chûjô, 1959
- Variimorda inomatai Takakuwa, 1985 (Japan)
- Variimorda ishiharai Kiyoyama, 1994 (temperate Asia)
- Variimorda krikkeni Batten, 1977
- Variimorda kurosawai Takakuwa, 2001
- Variimorda maiae Takakuwa, 2010 (Japan)
- Variimorda mendax Méquignon, 1946
- Variimorda miyarabi Nomura, 1962
- Variimorda persica Horak, 1985
- Variimorda phungi (Pic, 1923)
- Variimorda pustulata (Champion, 1891)
- Variimorda quomoi (Franciscolo, 1942)
- Variimorda ragusai (Emery, 1876)
- Variimorda shiyakei Horak, 1996
- Variimorda takakuwai, Horák 2009 (Vietnam, China, Laos, India)
- Variimorda theryi (Mequignon, 1946)
- Variimorda truncatopyga (Pic, 1938) (temperate Asia)
- Variimorda villosa (Schrank, 1781) (Europe)
