= Metaplastes ornatus =

Conservation status
- Least Concern (IUCN 3.1)

Scientific classification
- Domain: Eukaryota
- Kingdom: Animalia
- Phylum: Arthropoda
- Class: Insecta
- Order: Orthoptera
- Suborder: Ensifera
- Family: Tettigoniidae
- Subfamily: Phaneropterinae
- Genus: Metaplastes
- Species: M. ornatus

Binomial name
- Metaplastes ornatus (Ramme, 1931)

Species of cricket-like animal

Metaplastes ornatus is a species of bush cricket in the family Tettigoniidae.

The male of this bush cricket has a subgenital plate to display sperm removal. This mating behavior has two phases. In the first one the male introduces his subgenital plate into the female's genital chamber and moves it back-and-forth to remove the sperm of previous males. In the second phase the large spermatophore is introduced into the female.
