= Margarinotus guttifer =

Scientific classification
- Kingdom: Animalia
- Phylum: Arthropoda
- Class: Insecta
- Order: Coleoptera
- Suborder: Polyphaga
- Infraorder: Staphyliniformia
- Family: Histeridae
- Genus: Margarinotus
- Species: M. guttifer

Binomial name
- Margarinotus guttifer Horn, 1862

Species of beetle

Margarinotus guttifer is a species of clown beetle in the family Histeridae. It is found in North America.
