= Mediimorda maceki =

Scientific classification
- Kingdom: Animalia
- Phylum: Arthropoda
- Class: Insecta
- Order: Coleoptera
- Suborder: Polyphaga
- Infraorder: Cucujiformia
- Family: Mordellidae
- Subfamily: Mordellinae
- Tribe: Mordellini
- Genus: Mediimorda
- Species: M. maceki

Binomial name
- Mediimorda maceki Horak, 1985

Synonyms
- Mordella maceki (Horak, 1985)

Species of beetles

Mediimorda maceki is a species of tumbling flower beetle in the family Mordellidae, found in Iran and Iraq.
