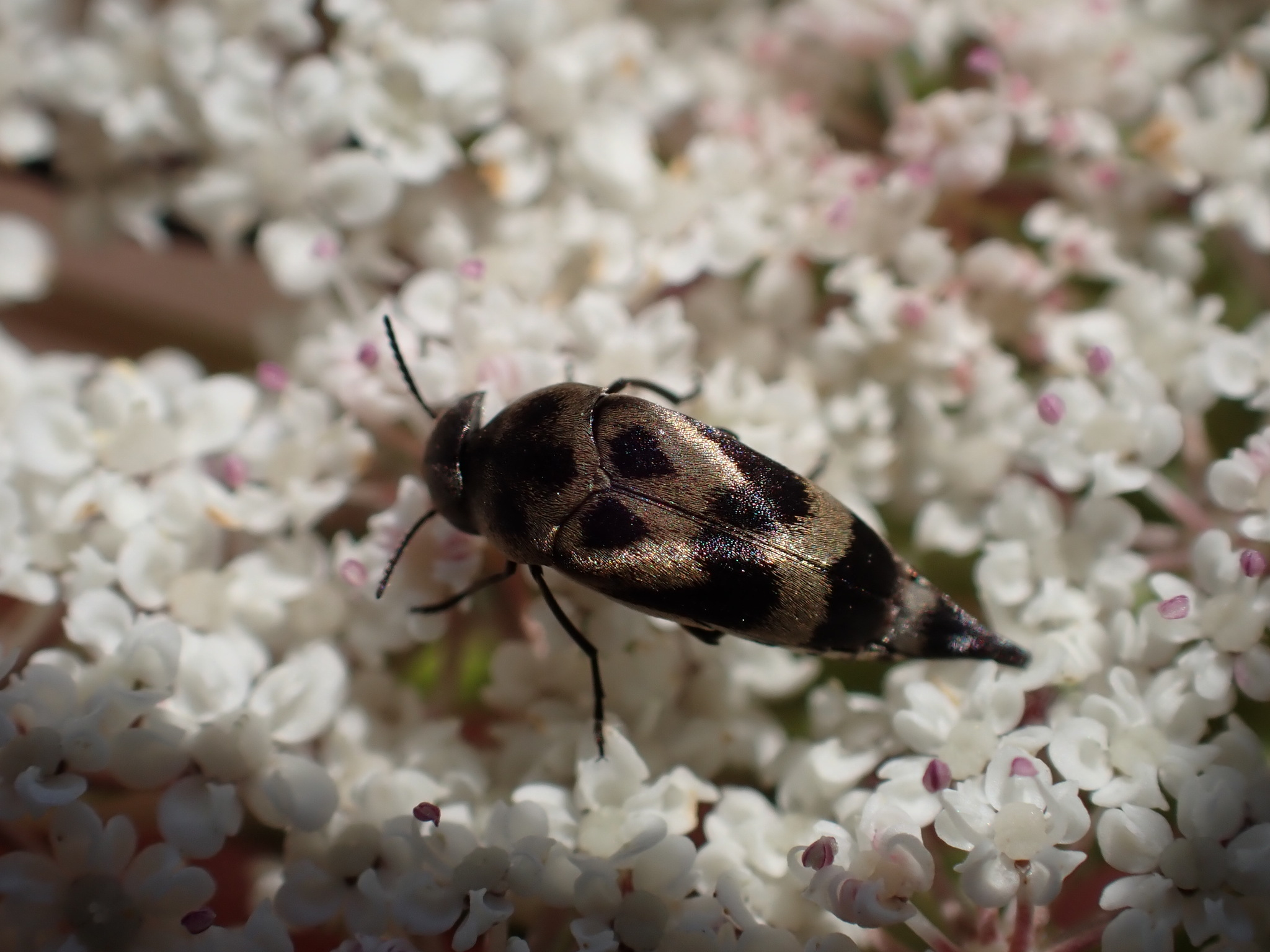
- Mediimorda, France

Scientific classification
- Kingdom: Animalia
- Phylum: Arthropoda
- Class: Insecta
- Order: Coleoptera
- Suborder: Polyphaga
- Infraorder: Cucujiformia
- Family: Mordellidae
- Subfamily: Mordellinae
- Tribe: Mordellini
- Genus: Mediimorda; Méquignon, 1946

= Mediimorda =

Genus of beetles

Mediimorda is a genus of tumbling flower beetles in the family Mordellidae. There are about seven described species in Mediimorda, found mainly in southern Europe and Mediterranean countries.

== Species ==
These seven species belong to the genus Mediimorda:

- Mediimorda angeliquae Leblanc, 2002
- Mediimorda attalica Schilsky, 1895
- Mediimorda batteni Plaza, 1985
- Mediimorda bipunctata (Germar, 1827)
- Mediimorda brusteli Leblanc, 2002
- Mediimorda fallaciosa (Stshegoleva-Barowskaja, 1930)
- Mediimorda maceki Horak, 1985
