= Zoological Museum of Naples =

Coordinates: 40°50′47″N 14°15′23″E

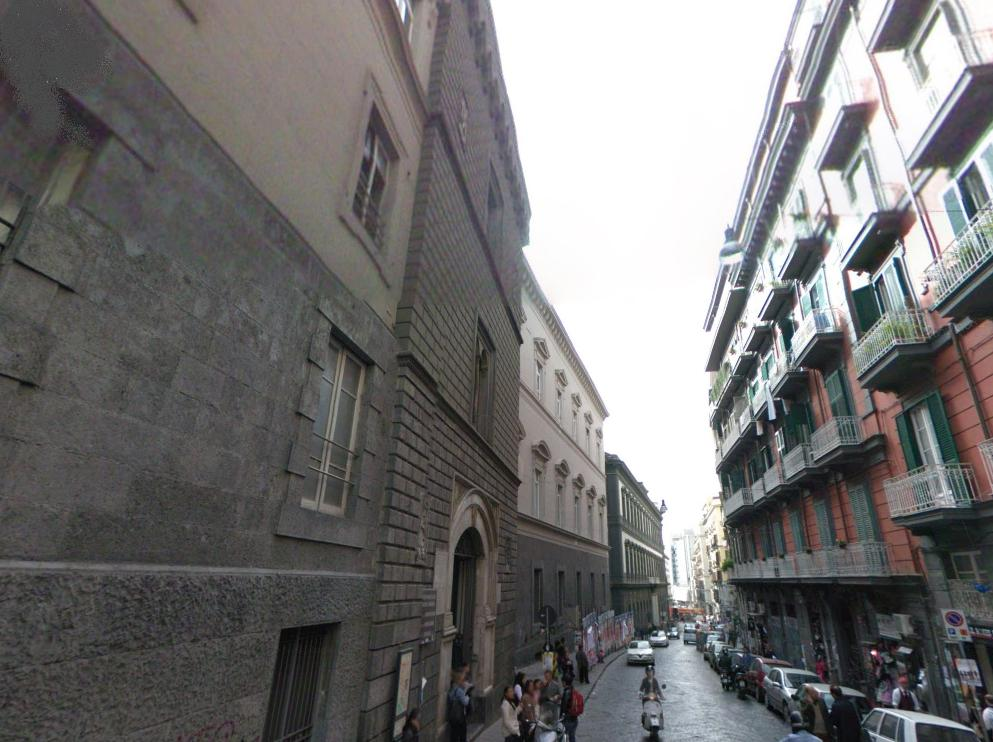
Entrance to Musei di Paleontologia, Mineralogia, Zoologia e Antropologia dell'Università Federico II at Via Mezzocannone, 8

The Zoological Museum of Naples, located in Naples, south Italy, was founded by Gioacchino Murat in 1811. The first curator was Luigi Petagna. The founding collections were those of the Royal Bourbon Museum and the private collection of Giuseppe Saverio Poli.

Later curators were: Giosuè Sangiovanni, Achille Costa (from 1860), Francesco Saverio Monticelli (from 1900). the museum was badly damaged in the Second World War but with Mario Salfi as Curator, it was restored between 1948 and 1970.

The museum is part of the University of Naples Federico II as Centro Musei delle Scienze Naturali. See PDF.
