= Margarinotus felipae =

Scientific classification
- Kingdom: Animalia
- Phylum: Arthropoda
- Class: Insecta
- Order: Coleoptera
- Suborder: Polyphaga
- Infraorder: Staphyliniformia
- Family: Histeridae
- Tribe: Histerini
- Genus: Margarinotus
- Species: M. felipae

Binomial name
- Margarinotus felipae (Lewis, 1901)

Species of beetle

Margarinotus felipae is a species of clown beetle in the family Histeridae.
