= Mediimorda fallaciosa =

Scientific classification
- Domain: Eukaryota
- Kingdom: Animalia
- Phylum: Arthropoda
- Class: Insecta
- Order: Coleoptera
- Suborder: Polyphaga
- Infraorder: Cucujiformia
- Family: Mordellidae
- Subfamily: Mordellinae
- Tribe: Mordellini
- Genus: Mediimorda
- Species: M. fallaciosa

Binomial name
- Mediimorda fallaciosa (Shchegolvera-Barovskaya, 1931)

Synonyms
- Mordella fallaciosa Shchegolvera-Barovskaya, 1931

Species of beetle

Mediimorda fallaciosa is a species of tumbling flower beetle in the family Mordellidae.
