= Mediimorda angeliquae =

Scientific classification
- Domain: Eukaryota
- Kingdom: Animalia
- Phylum: Arthropoda
- Class: Insecta
- Order: Coleoptera
- Suborder: Polyphaga
- Infraorder: Cucujiformia
- Family: Mordellidae
- Genus: Mediimorda
- Species: M. angeliquae

Binomial name
- Mediimorda angeliquae Leblanc, 2002

Species of beetles

Mediimorda angeliquae is a species of tumbling flower beetle in the family Mordellidae, found in southern Europe and Mediterranean countries.
