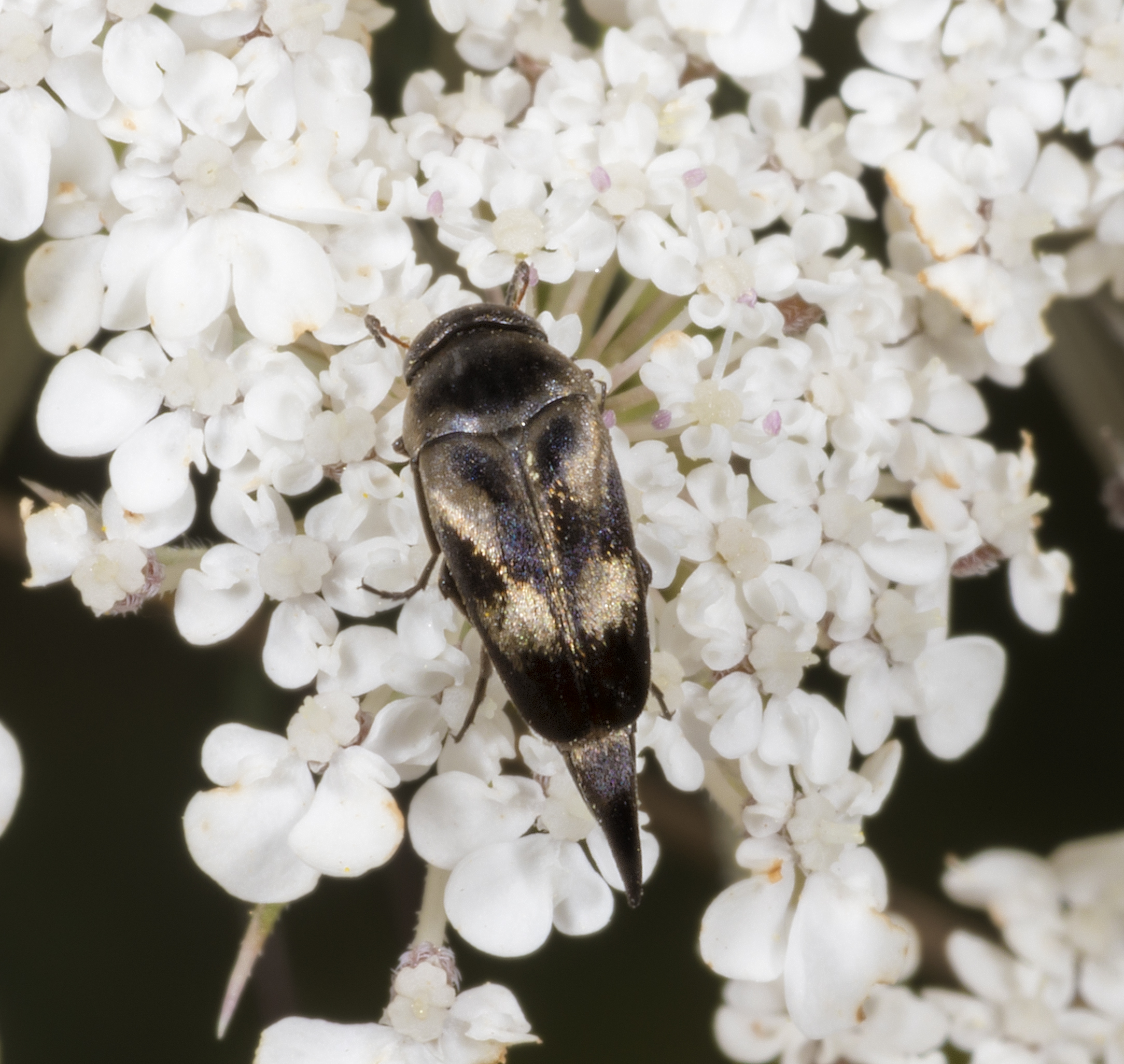

Scientific classification
- Kingdom: Animalia
- Phylum: Arthropoda
- Clade: Pancrustacea
- Class: Insecta
- Order: Coleoptera
- Suborder: Polyphaga
- Infraorder: Cucujiformia
- Family: Mordellidae
- Genus: Variimorda
- Species: V. villosa

Binomial name
- Variimorda villosa (Schrank, 1781)

Synonyms
- Mordella coronata Costa, 1854; Mordella fasciata Fabricius, 1775; Mordella fasciolata Rossi, 1792; Mordella habelmanni Emery, 1876; Mordella interrupta Costa, 1854; Mordella iriformis Fourcr, 1785; Mordella seriatoguttata Mulsant, 1856; Mordella subcoeca Mulsant, 1856; Mordella villosa; Variimorda fasciata (Fabricius nec Forster 1771), 1775)

= Variimorda villosa =

Species of beetle

Variimorda villosa is a species of tumbling flower beetle in the subfamily Mordellinae of the family Mordellidae.

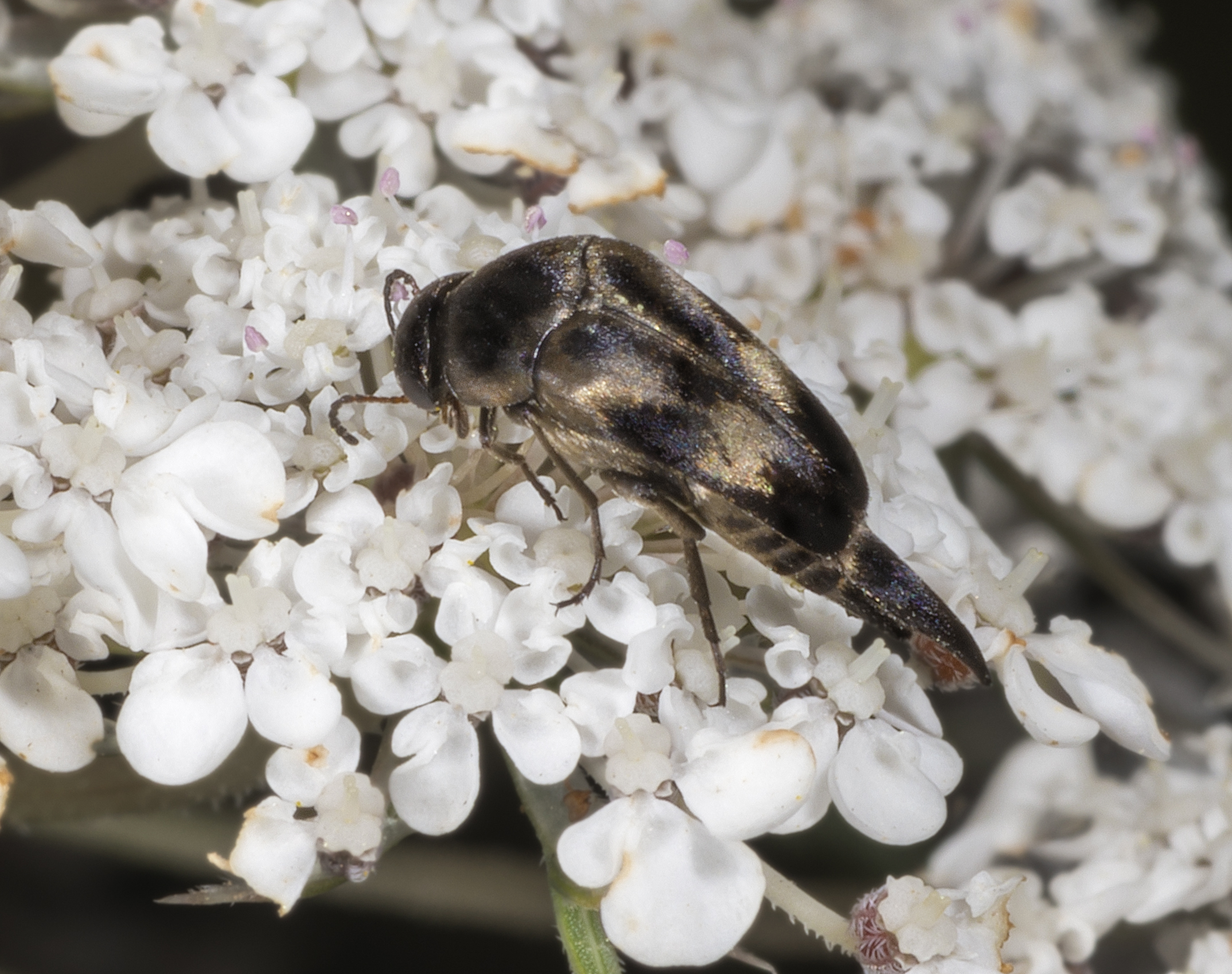
Variimorda villosa - Lateral view

These very small beetles are present in most of Europe. The adults can be encountered from July through August, especially feeding on flowers of Apiaceae species.

Their bodies have a sharp rear ending and a quite variable pattern of colours of lighter spots (yellowish, brownish, silvery, etc.).
