= Plegaderus transversus =

Scientific classification
- Kingdom: Animalia
- Phylum: Arthropoda
- Class: Insecta
- Order: Coleoptera
- Suborder: Polyphaga
- Infraorder: Staphyliniformia
- Family: Histeridae
- Genus: Plegaderus
- Species: P. transversus

Binomial name
- Plegaderus transversus (Say, 1825)

Species of beetle

Plegaderus transversus is a species of clown beetle in the family Histeridae. It is found in Central America and North America.
