= Variimorda flavimana =

Scientific classification
- Domain: Eukaryota
- Kingdom: Animalia
- Phylum: Arthropoda
- Class: Insecta
- Order: Coleoptera
- Suborder: Polyphaga
- Infraorder: Cucujiformia
- Family: Mordellidae
- Genus: Variimorda
- Species: V. flavimana

Binomial name
- Variimorda flavimana (Marseul, 1876)

Synonyms
- Mordella flavimana Marseul, 1876

Species of beetle

Variimorda flavimana is a species of tumbling flower beetles in the subfamily Mordellinae of the family Mordellidae.
