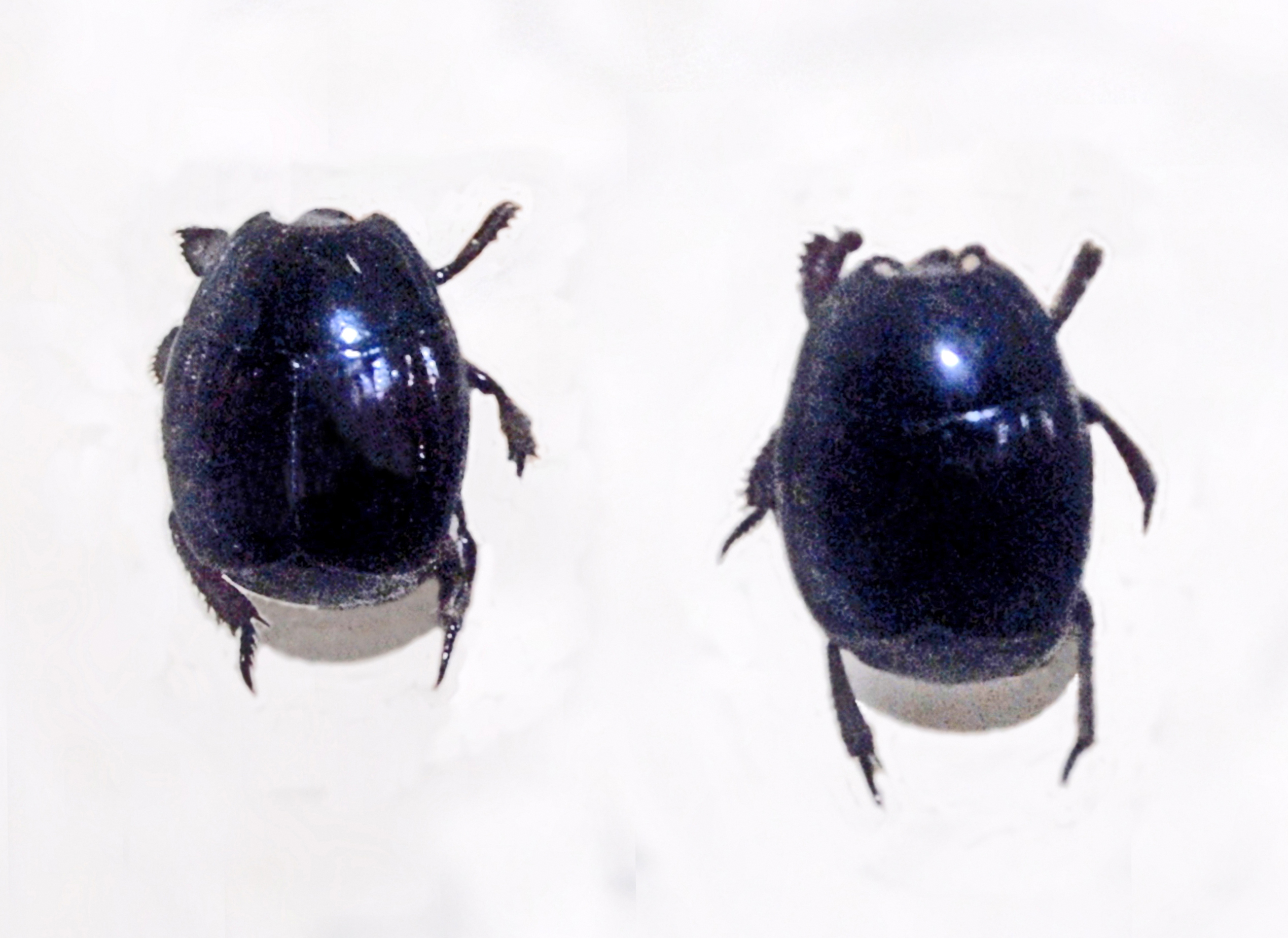
- Museum specimen

Scientific classification
- Domain: Eukaryota
- Kingdom: Animalia
- Phylum: Arthropoda
- Class: Insecta
- Order: Coleoptera
- Suborder: Polyphaga
- Infraorder: Staphyliniformia
- Family: Histeridae
- Genus: Margarinotus
- Species: M. brunneus

Binomial name
- Margarinotus brunneus (Fabricius, 1775)

Synonyms
- Margarinotus cadaverinus (Hoffmann, 1803); Ptomister brunneus; Margarinotus impressus

= Margarinotus brunneus =

Species of beetle

Margarinotus brunneus is a species of beetles belonging to the family Histeridae.

== Description ==
Margarinotus brunneus can reach a length of about 5.5–8.5 millimetres (0.22–0.33 in). Body is shiny black in colour. These beetles are characterized by the presence on the pronotum of complete marginal stria, by two lateral pronotal striae and basal fragments of the 5th dorsal striae.

== Distribution ==
This species is present in most of Europe. It has been introduced into eastern North America.

== Bibliography ==
- Anderson, R., Nash, R. & O'Connor, J.P.. 1997, Irish Coleoptera: a revised and annotated list, Irish Naturalists' Journal Special Entomological Supplement, 1-81
- Anderson, R., Nash, R., O'Connor, J.P. 2005. Checklist of Irish Coleoptera. InvertebrateIreland Online, Ulster Museum, Belfast and National Museum of Ireland, Dublin
- Joy, N.H., 1932, A practical handbook of British beetles, H.F. & G. Witherby, London
- Halstead, D.G.H., 1963, Coleoptera: Histeroidea
- Mazur, Slawomir (1997) A world catalogue of the Histeridae (Coleoptera: Histeroidea), Genus, International Journal of Invertebrate Taxonomy (Supplement)
- Bousquet, Yves, and Serge Laplante (2006) Coleoptera Histeridae, The Insects and Arachnids of Canada, part 2
