= Giuseppe Saverio Poli =

Italian physicist and biologist (1746–1825)

- Born: 26 October 1746; Molfetta, Kingdom of Naples
- Died: 7 April 1825 (aged 78); Naples, Kingdom of Naples
- Known for: Elements of Experimental Physics
- Scientific career
- Fields: physics, biology, malacology
- Author abbrev. (zoology): Poli

Giuseppe Saverio Poli (26 October 1746 – 7 April 1825) was an Italian physicist, biologist and natural historian.

His collections, together with those stored in the Royal Bourbon Museum, were the foundation of the Zoological Museum of Naples. The specimens were from locations all over the world, and included especially, Lepidoptera, Cnidaria and Mollusca.

== Biography ==
Giuseppe Saverio Poli was born in 1746 and was the son of Vito Angelo di Giuseppe and Eleonora Corlè. In 1766 he enrolled at the University of Padua, where he graduated in medicine. He briefly worked as a doctor in Molfetta, but in 1790 he moved to Naples to teach history and geography at the Nunziatella Military School, for which, once he became commander, with the rank of lieutenant colonel, he took care of the department of physics. In 1775 he toured Europe on behalf of the academy, visiting many seats of learning in Germany, France, England and the Netherlands and meeting naturalists and scientists. This enabled him to equip the physics department with the most modern equipment. He became friends with the Scottish physician and collector William Hunter, who encouraged him to study the molluscs of the Mediterranean, which were then very poorly known. He also added to his personal collection of natural history objects and archaeological artifacts. Later he taught physics at the Medical College of the Hospital of the Incurables, a position which he had to give up when he was appointed tutor to the hereditary prince, Francesco, son of Ferdinand I of Bourbon. He later became professor of experimental physics at the University of Naples, of which he was first director of physics.

His best known work is represented by the six volumes of the Elements of Experimental Physics, which had numerous editions and reprints and was modified and integrated on several occasions by Poli himself. The work was used by Alessandro Volta for his university lectures and was even read and studied by Giacomo Leopardi. It has also been criticized by Vincenzo Dandolo, as in the 1790s it still introduced phlogiston in the part relating to chemical reactions (volume III), which had already been widely recognized as non-existent by most scientists (the part relating to chemical reactions was preceded by an introduction by Dandolo himself, which explained the partial defects of the work). The changes made in the editions of the following years were to deny the existence of phlogiston even in his own work.

Thanks to his many travels, which put him in contact and correspondence with authoritative exponents of the international scientific world, he published numerous essays on various topics: not only relating to physics, but also to meteorology, in particular with the treatises on thunder (1772) and on lightning (1773), geology and zoology. Testimony of this last discipline remains the monumental Testacea utriusque Siciliae eorumque historia et antome tabulis aeneis illustrata, a description of the molluscs of the Kingdom of the Two Sicilies, begun with the help of his assistant Stefano Delle Chiaje, who collaborated in its publication. Poli was responsible for the discovery of the interradial vesicles of the water vascular system of echinoderms, which are known as "Polian vesicles".

He also tried his hand at poetry, with hymns and poems, of which the Celestial Journey, composed in two volumes, in 1805 provides a good example. He was a member of numerous scientific and cultural institutions, including the National Academy of Sciences. After a year in which his health deteriorated, Poli died in Naples on 7 April 1825. His personal collection of natural history objects and archaeological artefacts, amassed since the 1770s, was known by his friends as the Museo Poliano. They included minerals, fossils, mollusc shells, corals, sponges, insects (including a fine collection from Surinam), weapons, clothing, indigenous tools, paintings and scientific instruments. The more valuable items in the collection were looted by French troops during the conquest of Naples in 1806, and he later turned to collecting coins, medals and antiquities. After his death, these were curated by Delle Chiaie and acquired by the Royal Bourbon Museum and, along with his natural history collection, formed the foundation of the Zoological Museum of Naples.

== Works ==
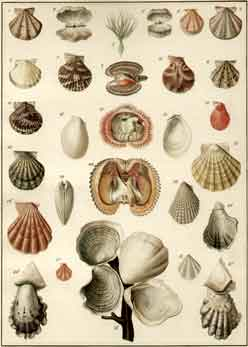
Testacea Utriusque Siciliae eorumque historia et anatome tabulis (plate)

- La formazione del tuono, della folgore, e di varie altre meteore, spiegata giusta le idee del signor Franklin. Naples: Donato Campo. 1772.
- Riflessioni intorno agli effetti di alcuni fulmini, Campo, Napoli 1773.
- Lezioni di geografia e di storia militare. Vol. 1. Naples: Fratelli Di Simone. 1774.
- Lezioni di geografia e di storia militare. Vol. 2. Naples: Fratelli Di Simone. 1776.
- Testacea Utriusque Siciliae Eorumque Istoria et Anatome Tabulis Aeneis. Vol. 1. Parma: Tipografia Regia. 1791.
- Testacea Utriusque Siciliae Eorumque Istoria et Anatome Tabulis Aeneis. Vol. 2. Parma: Tipografia Regia. 1795.
- Testacea Utriusque Siciliae Eorumque Istoria et Anatome Tabulis Aeneis. Vol. 3. Parma: Tipografia Regia. 1791.
- Testacea Utriusque Siciliae Eorumque Istoria et Anatome Tabulis Aeneis. Vol. 4. Parma: Tipografia Regia. 1791.
- Ragionamento intorno allo studio della natura. 1781.
- Elementi di fisica sperimentale. Vol. 1. 1822.
- Elementi di fisica sperimentale. Vol. 2. 1822.
- Elementi di fisica sperimentale. Vol. 3. 1822.
- Elementi di fisica sperimentale. Vol. 4. 1822.
- Elementi di fisica sperimentale. Vol. 5. 1822.
- Viaggio celeste - Poema astronomico del tenente colonnello Giuseppe Saverio Poli. Vol. 1. Naples: Stamperia Reale. 1805.
- Viaggio celeste - Poema astronomico del tenente colonnello Giuseppe Saverio Poli. Vol. 2. Naples: Stamperia Reale. 1805.
- Memoria sul tremuoto de' 26 luglio del corrente anno 1805. Naples: Orsino. 1806.
- Breve saggio sulla calamita e sulla sua virtù medicinale, Stamperia Reale, Palermo 1811.

== Works about Giuseppe Saverio Poli ==
- Alfonso Filipponi (1825). In morte del chiarissimo Giuseppe Saverio Poli.
- Elogio del commendatore Giuseppe-Saverio Poli. Naples: Gabinetto Bibliografico e Tipografico. 1825.
- Serafino Gatti (1825). Elogio del cavaliere Giuseppe-Saverio Poli. Naples: Tipografia di Agnello Nobile.
- Giuseppe Catenacci (1998). Il tenente colonnello Giuseppe Saverio Poli, comandante della Real Accademia Nunziatella (PDF). Associazione Nazionale Ex-Allievi Nunziatella.

== Bibliography ==
- Esposito, Salvatore (2016). "Enlightenment in the Kingdom of Naples: the legacy of Giuseppe Saverio Poli through archive documents". Atti del XXXVI Convegno annuale SISFA: 33–53. doi:10.23739/9788869520709/c02.
