= Margarinotus taiwanus =

Scientific classification
- Kingdom: Animalia
- Phylum: Arthropoda
- Class: Insecta
- Order: Coleoptera
- Suborder: Polyphaga
- Infraorder: Staphyliniformia
- Family: Histeridae
- Genus: Margarinotus
- Subgenus: Grammostethus
- Species: M. taiwanus

Binomial name
- Margarinotus taiwanus Mazur, 2008

Species of beetle

Margarinotus taiwanus is a species of clown beetle in the family Histeridae. It is endemic to Taiwan.

== Distribution ==
The type series was collected from Tatachia in Nantou in central Taiwan. Additional specimens were obtained from Hsinpaiyang (=Xinbaiyang) in Hualien on the east coast of Taiwan.

== Description ==
The body is elongate-oval, convex, black, and shiny. The dorsal side is finely and rarely punctulate, although the elytra are sometimes more coarsely punctate. The legs are paler than the body, pitch-brown and a little expanded. It can be distinguished from all other members of the subgenus Grammostethus by the foretibia not being multidentate.

Total length is 5–6 mm (0.20–0.24 in) and width is 3.2–3.6 mm (0.13–0.14 in).
