= Variimorda bistrinotata =

Scientific classification
- Domain: Eukaryota
- Kingdom: Animalia
- Phylum: Arthropoda
- Class: Insecta
- Order: Coleoptera
- Suborder: Polyphaga
- Infraorder: Cucujiformia
- Family: Mordellidae
- Subfamily: Mordellinae
- Tribe: Mordellini
- Genus: Variimorda
- Species: V. bistrinotata

Binomial name
- Variimorda bistrinotata (Píc, 1928)

Synonyms
- Mordella Píc, 1928

Species of beetle

Variimorda bistrinotata is a species of tumbling flower beetles in the family Mordellidae. It was discovered in 1928.
