= Margarinotus umbrosus =

Scientific classification
- Kingdom: Animalia
- Phylum: Arthropoda
- Class: Insecta
- Order: Coleoptera
- Suborder: Polyphaga
- Infraorder: Staphyliniformia
- Family: Histeridae
- Genus: Margarinotus
- Species: M. umbrosus

Binomial name
- Margarinotus umbrosus (Casey, 1893)

Synonyms
- Hister umbrosus Casey, 1893

Species of beetle

Margarinotus umbrosus is a species of clown beetle in the family Histeridae. It is found in Western North America, from central California to British Columbia in the north and eastward to Montana and Alberta. It has been recorded from dung, carrion, and decaying vegetation.
