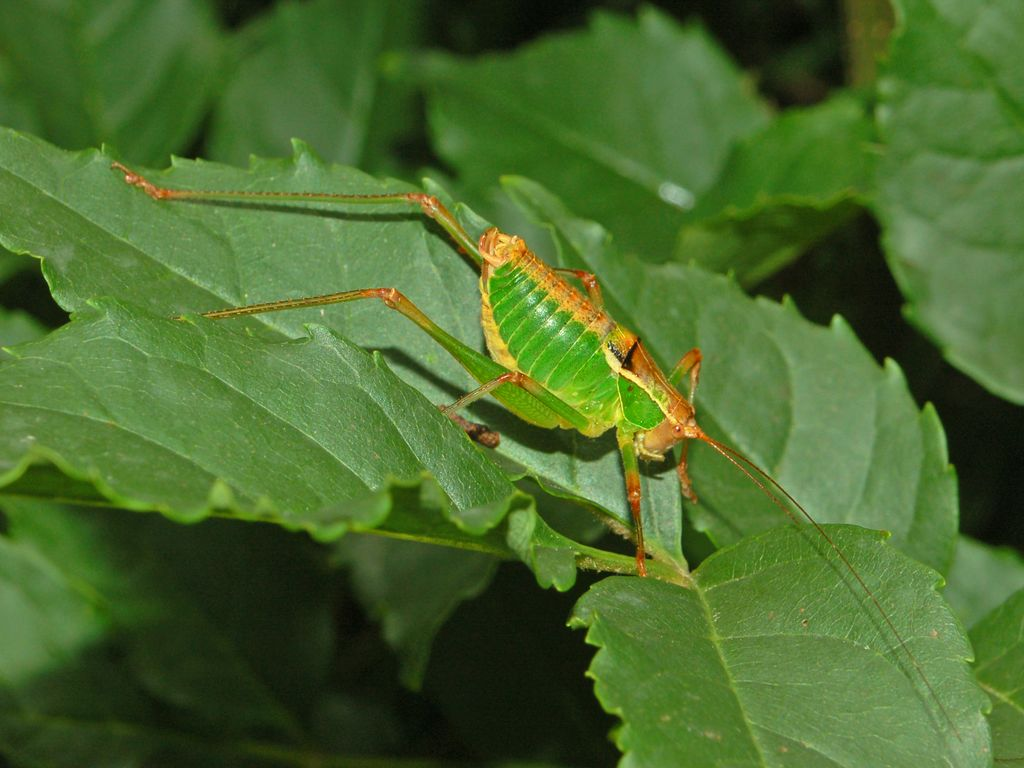
- Adult of Metaplastes pulchripennis

Scientific classification
- Domain: Eukaryota
- Kingdom: Animalia
- Phylum: Arthropoda
- Class: Insecta
- Order: Orthoptera
- Suborder: Ensifera
- Family: Tettigoniidae
- Subfamily: Phaneropterinae
- Tribe: Barbitistini
- Genus: Metaplastes (Ramme, 1939)

= Metaplastes =

Genus of cricket-like animals

Metaplastes is a genus of southern European bush crickets in the subfamily Phaneropterinae and tribe Barbitistini.

== Species ==
The Orthoptera Species File lists:

1. Metaplastes ippolitoi La Greca, 1948
2. Metaplastes oertzeni (Brunner von Wattenwyl, 1891) - type species
3. Metaplastes ornatus (Ramme, 1931)
4. Metaplastes pulchripennis (A. Costa, 1863)
