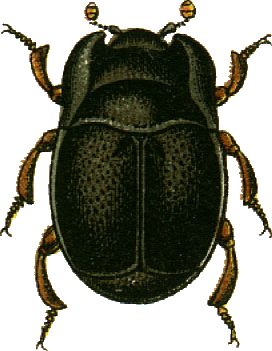
- Plegaderus caesus

Scientific classification
- Kingdom: Animalia
- Phylum: Arthropoda
- Class: Insecta
- Order: Coleoptera
- Suborder: Polyphaga
- Infraorder: Staphyliniformia
- Family: Histeridae
- Tribe: Abraeini
- Genus: Plegaderus; Erichson, 1834

= Plegaderus =

Genus of beetles

Plegaderus is a genus of clown beetles in the family Histeridae. There are more than 30 described species in Plegaderus.

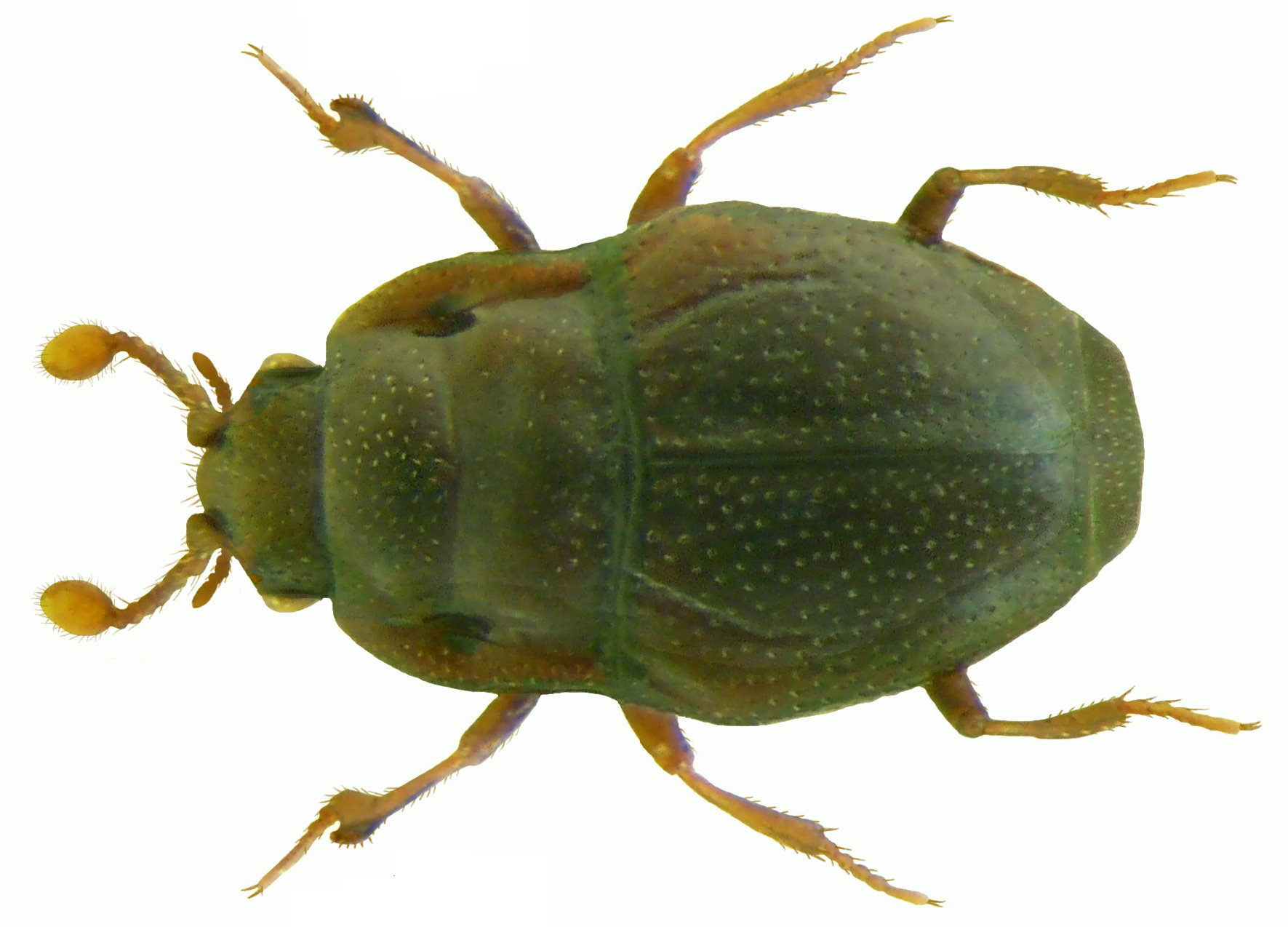
Plegaderus dissectus

== Species ==
These 31 species belong to the genus Plegaderus:

- Plegaderus adonis Marseul, 1876
- Plegaderus barbelini Marseul, 1862
- Plegaderus caesus (Herbst, 1791)
- Plegaderus comonforti Marseul, 1862
- Plegaderus confusus Bousquet & Laplante, 1999
- Plegaderus consors Horn, 1873
- Plegaderus convergens Casey, 1916
- Plegaderus cribratus Casey, 1893
- Plegaderus densus Casey, 1916
- Plegaderus discisus Erichson, 1839
- Plegaderus dissectus Erichson, 1839
- Plegaderus erichsoni LeConte, 1863
- Plegaderus fortesculptus Reitter, 1897
- Plegaderus fraternus Horn, 1870
- Plegaderus marseuli Reitter, 1877
- Plegaderus molestus Casey, 1893
- Plegaderus monachus Marseul, 1870
- Plegaderus nitidus Horn, 1870
- Plegaderus obesus Casey, 1916
- Plegaderus otti Marseul, 1856
- Plegaderus pygidialis Casey, 1916
- Plegaderus rigidus Casey, 1893
- Plegaderus sanatus Truqui, 1852
- Plegaderus saucius Erichson, 1834
- Plegaderus sayi Marseul, 1856
- Plegaderus setulosus Ross, 1938
- Plegaderus shikokensis Hisamatsu, 1985
- Plegaderus sulcatus Casey
- Plegaderus transversus (Say, 1825)
- Plegaderus vegrandis Casey
- Plegaderus vulneratus (Panzer, 1797)
