= Variimorda fagniezi =

Scientific classification
- Domain: Eukaryota
- Kingdom: Animalia
- Phylum: Arthropoda
- Class: Insecta
- Order: Coleoptera
- Suborder: Polyphaga
- Infraorder: Cucujiformia
- Family: Mordellidae
- Genus: Variimorda
- Species: V. fagniezi

Binomial name
- Variimorda fagniezi (Méquignon, 1946)

Synonyms
- Mordella fagniezi Méquignon, 1946

Species of beetle

Variimorda fagniezi is a species of tumbling flower beetles in the subfamily Mordellinae of the family Mordellidae.

== Subspecies ==
- Variimorda fagniezi fagniezi Méquignon, 1946
- Variimorda fagniezi therondi Méquignon, 1946
