= Variimorda basalis =

Scientific classification
- Domain: Eukaryota
- Kingdom: Animalia
- Phylum: Arthropoda
- Class: Insecta
- Order: Coleoptera
- Suborder: Polyphaga
- Infraorder: Cucujiformia
- Family: Mordellidae
- Genus: Variimorda
- Species: V. basalis

Binomial name
- Variimorda basalis (Costa, 1854)

Synonyms
- Mordella basalis Costa, 1854; Mordella pseudobrachyura Franciscolo, 1949

Species of beetle

Variimorda basalis is a species of tumbling flower beetles in the subfamily Mordellinae of the family Mordellidae.
