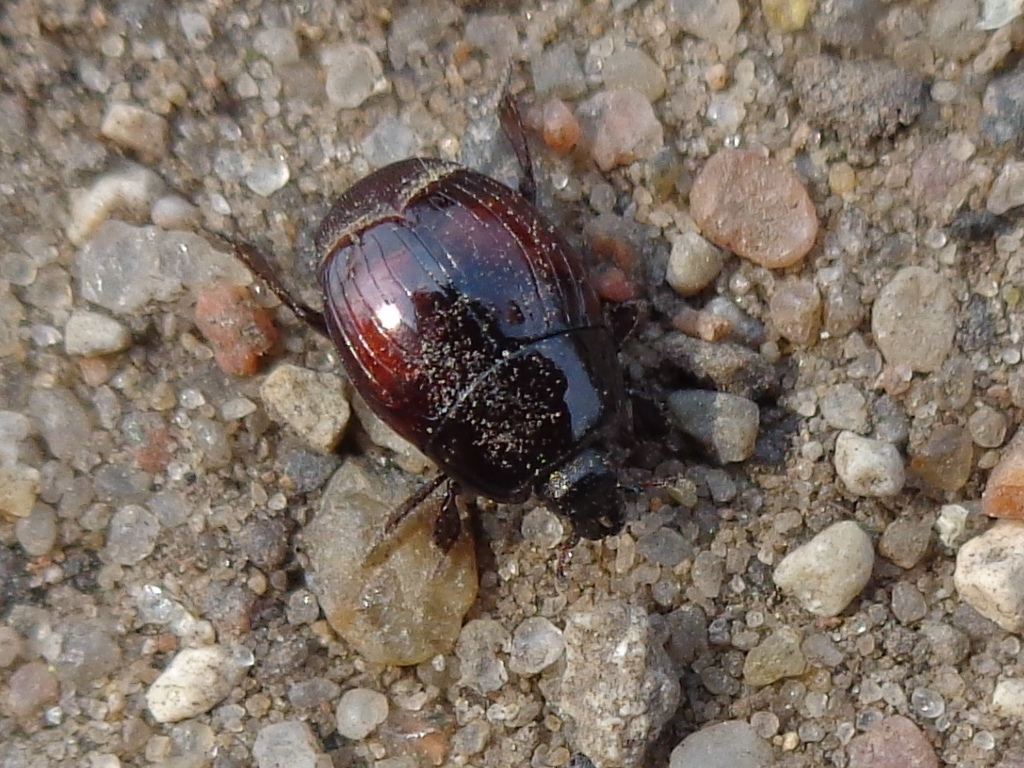

Scientific classification
- Kingdom: Animalia
- Phylum: Arthropoda
- Class: Insecta
- Order: Coleoptera
- Suborder: Polyphaga
- Infraorder: Staphyliniformia
- Family: Histeridae
- Genus: Margarinotus
- Species: M. purpurascens

Binomial name
- Margarinotus purpurascens (Herbst, 1791)

= Margarinotus purpurascens =

Species of beetle

Margarinotus purpurascens is a species of clown beetle in the family Histeridae. It is found in Europe and Northern Asia (excluding China), North America, and Southern Asia.
