= Perisse Frères =

Perisse Frères (established c. 1760) was a publishing firm in Lyon, France, established by Jean-André Perisse-Duluc (born 1738) and his brother Antoine. Around 1825 the business expanded to Paris, becoming "Bourguet-Calas et Cie" in 1874. The business in Lyon continued into the 1880s.

== Published by the firm ==
- Anne-Marie du Boccage (1764), Recueil des oeuvres de Madame Du Bocage, Lyon: Frères Perisse
- Vitet, Louis (1778). Pharmacopée de Lyon, ou exposition méthodique des médicaments simples et composés. Les Freres Perisse.
- André-Marie Ampère (1802), Considerations sur la théorie mathématique du jeu, Lyon: Chez les frères Perisse, OL 23290595M
- Voltaire (1807), La Henriade, Lyon: Chez les frères Perisse
- Jacques Bins (1835), Lettres sur les États-Unis d'Amérique
- Sylvain Auguste de Marseul (1839), Éléments d'arithmétique raisonnée, à l'usage des frères de Saint-Joseph, Paris et Lyon: Périsse frères
- Rituale Romanum, Pauli V jussu editum, inde vero a Benedicto XIV auctum et castigatum, Lyon, Paris: Perisse Frères, 1848, OL 24356966M

== See also ==
- Books in France
