= Margarinotus merdarius =

Scientific classification
- Kingdom: Animalia
- Phylum: Arthropoda
- Class: Insecta
- Order: Coleoptera
- Suborder: Polyphaga
- Infraorder: Staphyliniformia
- Family: Histeridae
- Genus: Margarinotus
- Species: M. merdarius

Binomial name
- Margarinotus merdarius (Hoffmann, 1803)

Species of beetle

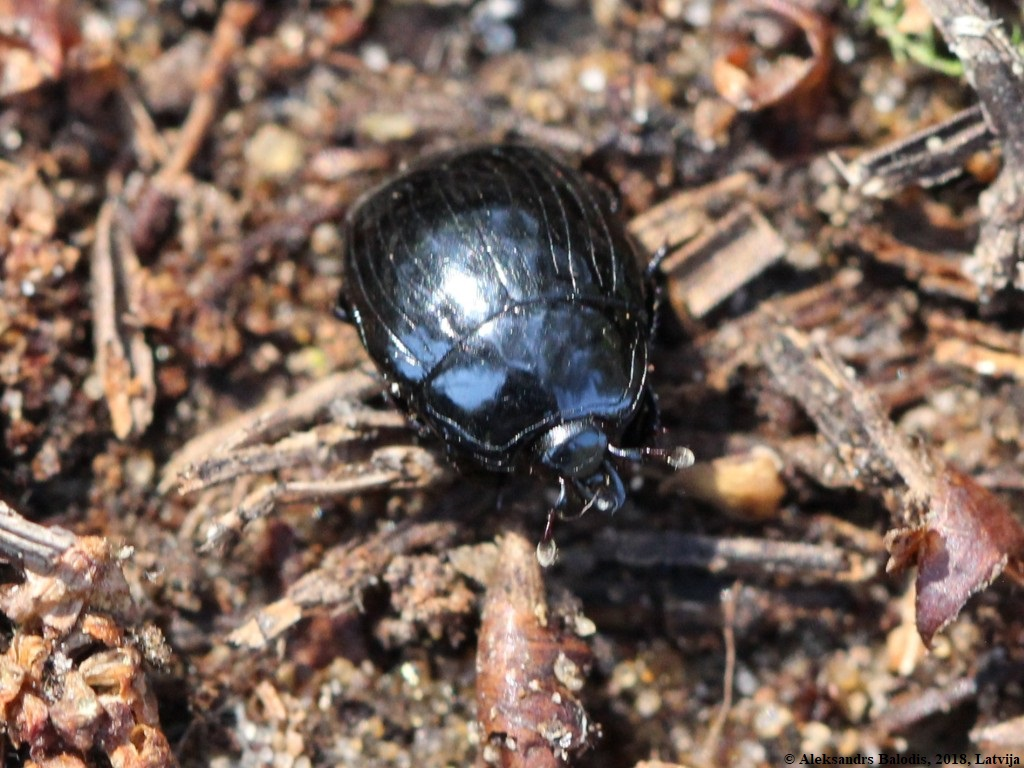

Margarinotus merdarius is a species of clown beetle in the family Histeridae. It is found in Africa, Europe and Northern Asia (excluding China), and North America.
