= Margarinotus ephemeralis =

Scientific classification
- Domain: Eukaryota
- Kingdom: Animalia
- Phylum: Arthropoda
- Class: Insecta
- Order: Coleoptera
- Suborder: Polyphaga
- Infraorder: Staphyliniformia
- Family: Histeridae
- Genus: Margarinotus
- Subgenus: Paralister
- Species: M. ephemeralis

Binomial name
- Margarinotus ephemeralis Caterino, 2010

Species of beetle

Margarinotus ephemeralis is a species of clown beetle in the family Histeridae. It is currently only known from southern California.

== Description ==
The body is oblong oval and measures 3.8–5.2 mm (0.1–0.2 in) in length (from anterior margin of pronotum to posterior margin of elytra) and 2.7–3.2 mm (0.1–0.1 in) in width. The elytra have five striae; the first three are complete, the fourth is complete or slightly abbreviated, and the fifth is present in apical half or less, and may be nearly absent. The prothorax has convergent, arcuate sides; the pronotum has a single lateral stria. Margarinotus ephemeralis is very similar to Margarinotus remotus, but differ in the pronotal punctuation.

== Ecology ==
Some specimens were collected from the burrow entrances of California ground squirrel, and others from temporary pools where they presumably had been flooded out of burrows. This species might be an obligate inquiline of California ground squirrel burrows.
