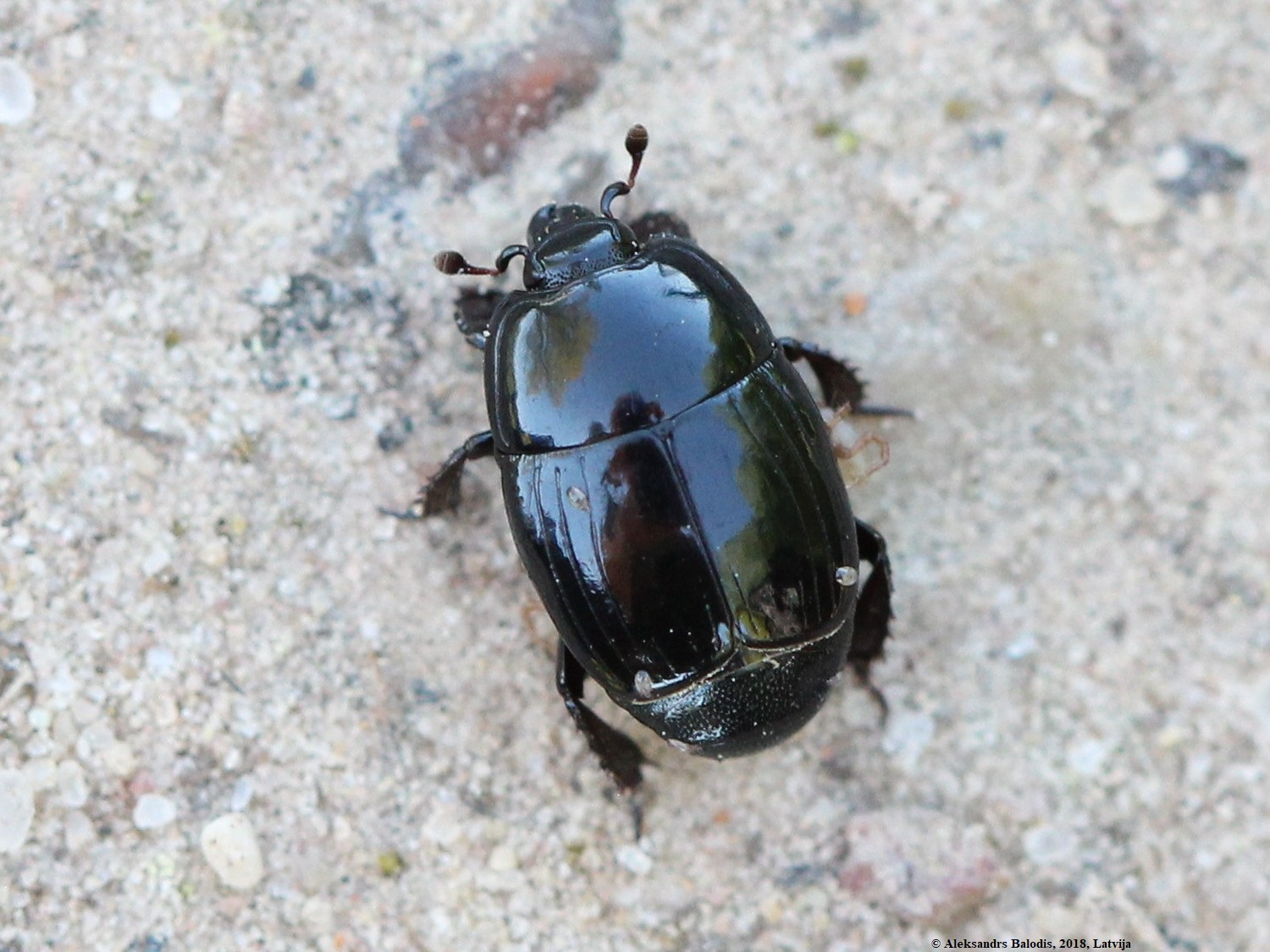

Scientific classification
- Kingdom: Animalia
- Phylum: Arthropoda
- Clade: Pancrustacea
- Class: Insecta
- Order: Coleoptera
- Suborder: Polyphaga
- Infraorder: Staphyliniformia
- Family: Histeridae
- Genus: Margarinotus
- Species: M. obscurus

Binomial name
- Margarinotus obscurus (Kugelann, 1792)

= Margarinotus obscurus =

Species of beetle

Margarinotus obscurus is a species of clown beetle in the family Histeridae. It is found in Africa, Europe and Northern Asia (excluding China), North America, and Southern Asia.
