= Variimorda ragusai =

Scientific classification
- Domain: Eukaryota
- Kingdom: Animalia
- Phylum: Arthropoda
- Class: Insecta
- Order: Coleoptera
- Suborder: Polyphaga
- Infraorder: Cucujiformia
- Family: Mordellidae
- Genus: Variimorda
- Species: V. ragusai

Binomial name
- Variimorda ragusai (Emery, 1876)

Synonyms
- Mordella ragusai Emery, 1876

Species of beetle

Variimorda ragusai is a species of tumbling flower beetles in the subfamily Mordellinae of the family Mordellidae.

== Subspecies ==
- Variimorda ragusai nigrata (Méquignon, 1946)
- Variimorda ragusai ragusai (Emery, 1876)
