= Variimorda briantea =

Scientific classification
- Domain: Eukaryota
- Kingdom: Animalia
- Phylum: Arthropoda
- Class: Insecta
- Order: Coleoptera
- Suborder: Polyphaga
- Infraorder: Cucujiformia
- Family: Mordellidae
- Genus: Variimorda
- Species: V. briantea

Binomial name
- Variimorda briantea (Comolli, 1837)

Synonyms
- Mordella briantea Comolli, 1837

Species of beetle

Variimorda briantea is a species of tumbling flower beetles in the subfamily Mordellinae of the family Mordellidae.
