= Variimorda ihai =

Scientific classification
- Domain: Eukaryota
- Kingdom: Animalia
- Phylum: Arthropoda
- Class: Insecta
- Order: Coleoptera
- Suborder: Polyphaga
- Infraorder: Cucujiformia
- Family: Mordellidae
- Genus: Variimorda
- Species: V. ihai

Binomial name
- Variimorda ihai Chûjô, 1959

Species of beetle

Variimorda ihai is a species of tumbling flower beetles in the subfamily Mordellinae of the family Mordellidae.

== Subspecies ==
- Variimorda ihai boninensis Nomura, 1975
- Variimorda ihai ihai Chûjô, 1959
