= Variimorda quomoi =

Scientific classification
- Domain: Eukaryota
- Kingdom: Animalia
- Phylum: Arthropoda
- Class: Insecta
- Order: Coleoptera
- Suborder: Polyphaga
- Infraorder: Cucujiformia
- Family: Mordellidae
- Subfamily: Mordellinae
- Tribe: Mordellini
- Genus: Variimorda
- Species: V. quomoi

Binomial name
- Variimorda quomoi (Franciscolo, 1942)

Synonyms
- Mordella quomoi Franciscolo, 1942

Species of beetles

Variimorda quomoi is a species of tumbling flower beetle in the family Mordellidae.
