= Mediimorda argyropleura =

Scientific classification
- Kingdom: Animalia
- Phylum: Arthropoda
- Class: Insecta
- Order: Coleoptera
- Suborder: Polyphaga
- Infraorder: Cucujiformia
- Family: Mordellidae
- Genus: Mediimorda
- Species: M. argyropleura

Binomial name
- Mediimorda argyropleura (Franciscolo, 1942)

Synonyms
- Mordella argyropleura Franciscolo, 1942; Variimorda argyropleura (Franciscolo, 1942); Falsopseudotomoxia argyropleura (Franciscolo, 1942)

Species of beetles

Mediimorda argyropleura is a species of tumbling flower beetle in the family Mordellidae.
