= Variimorda truncatopyga =

Scientific classification
- Kingdom: Animalia
- Phylum: Arthropoda
- Class: Insecta
- Order: Coleoptera
- Suborder: Polyphaga
- Infraorder: Cucujiformia
- Family: Mordellidae
- Genus: Variimorda
- Species: V. truncatopyga

Binomial name
- Variimorda truncatopyga (Pic, 1938)

Synonyms
- Mordella truncatopyga Pic, 1938; Mordella taiwana Nakane & Nomura, 1950

Species of beetles

Variimorda truncatopyga is a species of tumbling flower beetle in the family Mordellidae. It is found in temperate Asia, in China and Taiwan.
