= Variimorda kurosawai =

Scientific classification
- Domain: Eukaryota
- Kingdom: Animalia
- Phylum: Arthropoda
- Class: Insecta
- Order: Coleoptera
- Suborder: Polyphaga
- Infraorder: Cucujiformia
- Family: Mordellidae
- Genus: Variimorda
- Species: V. kurosawai

Binomial name
- Variimorda kurosawai Takakuwa, 2001

Species of beetle

Variimorda kurosawai is a species of tumbling flower beetles in the subfamily Mordellinae of the family Mordellidae.
