= Variimorda ishiharai =

Scientific classification
- Kingdom: Animalia
- Phylum: Arthropoda
- Class: Insecta
- Order: Coleoptera
- Suborder: Polyphaga
- Infraorder: Cucujiformia
- Family: Mordellidae
- Genus: Variimorda
- Species: V. ishiharai

Binomial name
- Variimorda ishiharai Kiyoyama, 1994

Species of beetle

Variimorda ishiharai is a species of "tumbling flower beetles" in the family Mordellidae. It is endemic to Taiwan.
