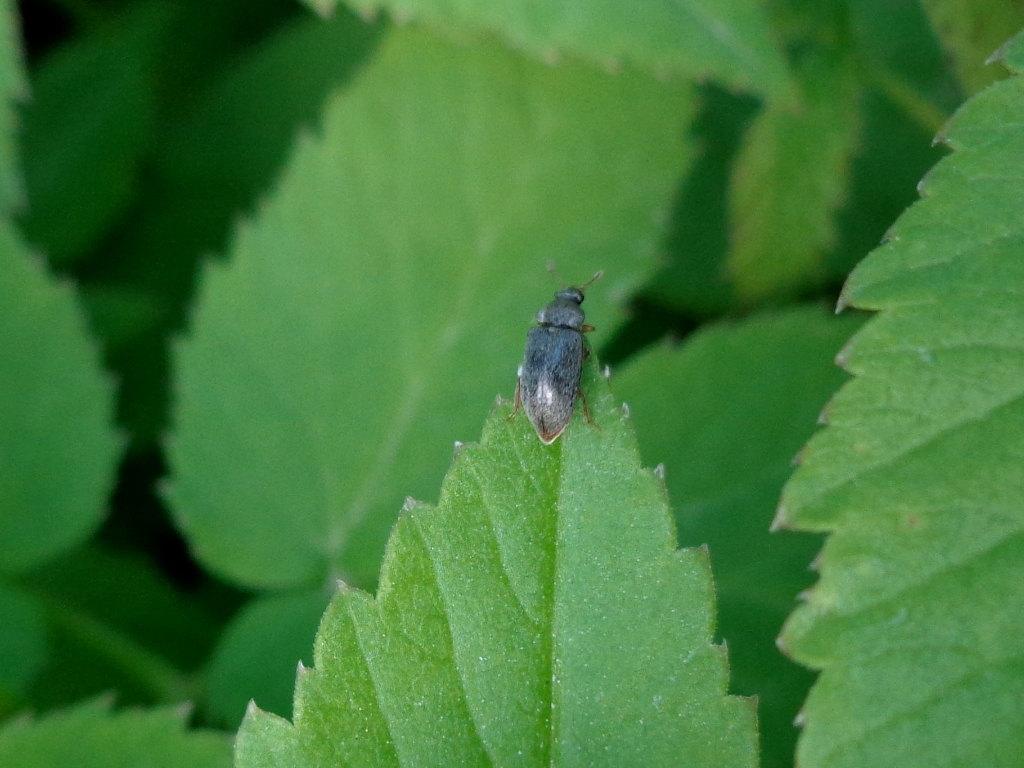

Scientific classification
- Domain: Eukaryota
- Kingdom: Animalia
- Phylum: Arthropoda
- Class: Insecta
- Order: Coleoptera
- Suborder: Polyphaga
- Infraorder: Cucujiformia
- Family: Mordellidae
- Genus: Variimorda
- Species: V. mendax

Binomial name
- Variimorda mendax Méquignon, 1946

= Variimorda mendax =

Species of beetle

Variimorda mendax is a species of tumbling flower beetles in the subfamily Mordellinaeof the family Mordellidae.

== Subspecies ==
- Variimorda mendax chobauti Méquignon, 1946
- Variimorda mendax devillei Méquignon, 1946
- Variimorda mendax mendax Méquignon, 1946
