= Achille Costa =

Italian zoologist

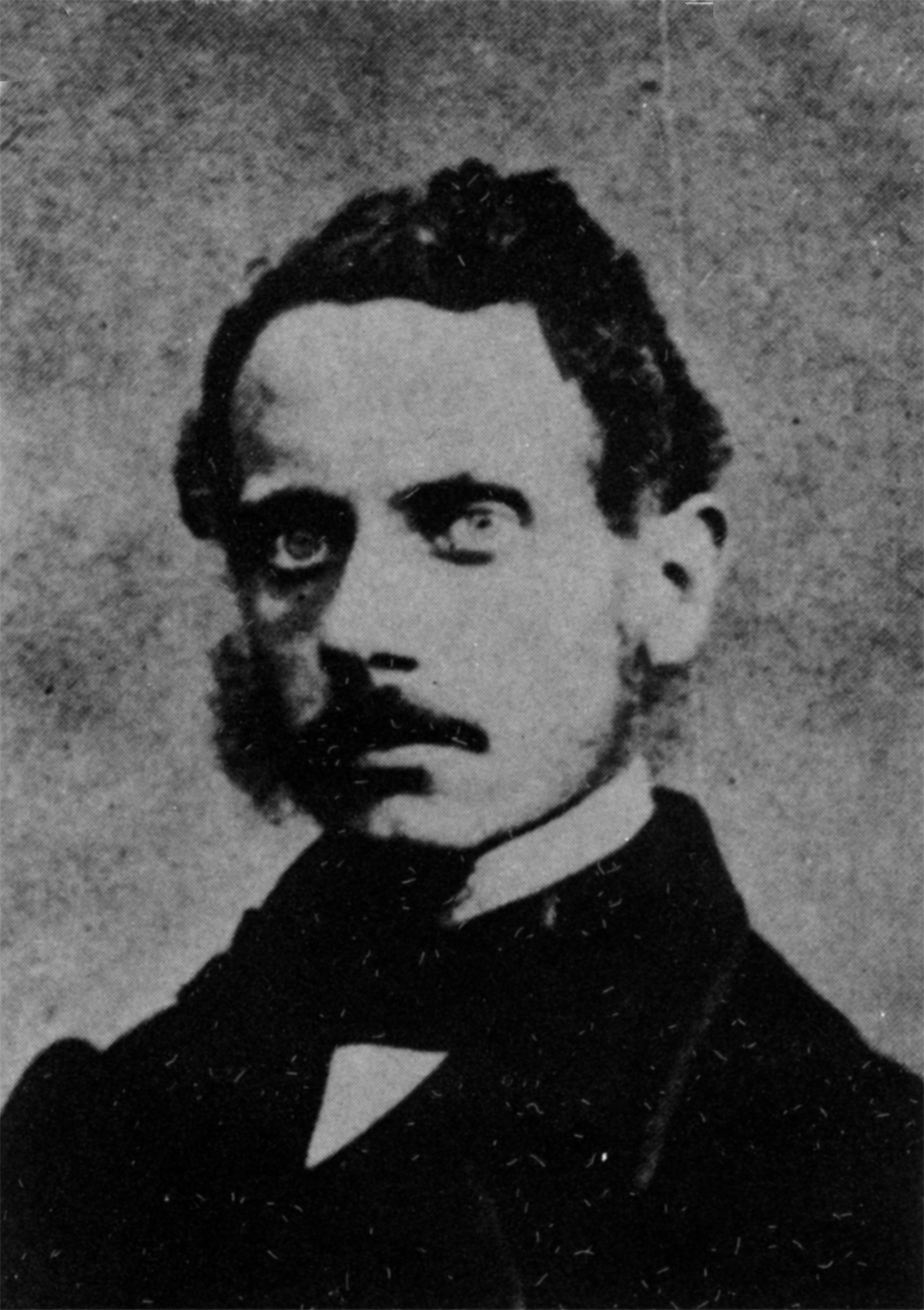
Achille Costa.

Achille Costa (10 August 1823, Lecce – 17 November 1899 Rome) was an Italian zoologist working mainly in entomology who was appointed director of the Zoological Museum of Naples. He founded the entomological collections in Naples and described many new species.

Achille Costa was the son of Oronzio Gabriele Costa. He made the greatest contribution to the entomological exploration of southern Italy and the Italian islands in the second half of the 19th century

== Works ==
Partial List

- 1855 Famiglia degli Ascalafidei – Ascalaphidea,512 pp. In: Costa, A., 1860-70 (see).
- 1855 Famiglia de’ Formicaleonidei – Myrmeleontidea,20 pp. In: Costa, A. 1860-70 (see).
- 1855 Famiglia degli Emerobiidei - Hemerobiidea,22 pp. In: Costa, A. 1860-70 (see).
- 1855 Famiglia de’ Mantispidei - Mantispidea, 2pp. In: Costa, A. 1860-70 (see)..
- Famiglia de’ Rafidiidei - Rhaphidiidea, 8pp. In: Costa, A. 1860-70 (see).
- 1856 Alcune notizie sull’Entomologia dell’Isolad’Ischia.- L’Iride Giornale per tutti, 1 (11): 81-82 [ Napoli].
- 1857 Degl’Insetti che attaccano l’albero ed ilfrutto dell’olivo del ciliegio del pero del melo del castagno e della vite e le semenze del pisello della lenticchia della favae del grano loro descrizione e biologia danni che arrecano e mezzi per distruggerli. Opera coronata dalla Reale Accademia delle Scienze di Napoli.- Stamperia e Calcografia vico Freddo Pignasecca, 15, 16. Napoli. 197 pp., 10 pl.
- 1858 Ricerche entomologiche sopra i Monti Partenii nel Principato Ulteriore.- Stamperia e Calcografia, Napoli. 31 pp., 1 pl.
- 1860-70 Fauna del Regno di Napoli ossia enumerazione di tutti gli animali che abitano le diverse regioni di questo Regno e le acque che le bagnano e descrizione de’nuovi o poco esattamente conosciuti con figure ricavate daoriginali viventi e dipinte al naturale. Nevrotteri.- Stamperia di Antonio Cons, Napoli. 83 pp.,7 pl.
- 1862 Elenco delle specie immesse nel Museo da Novembre 1860 a tutto Dicembre 1861. Nevrotteri.- Annuario del Museo Zoologico della R. Università di Napoli, Anno I 1862: 16.
- 1862 Ragguaglio di una peregrinazione zoologica.Annuario del Museo Zoologico della R. Università di Napoli, Anno I 1862: 57-60.
- 1863.- Nuovi studii sulla entomologia della Calabria ulteriore.- Atti della R. Accademia delle Scienze Fisichee Matematiche Serie 1a Vol. I [fasc. 2], 80 pp., 4 pl.
- 1864.- Acquisti fatti durante l’anno 1862.- Annuario del Museo Zoologico della R. Università di Napoli, Anno II 1862: 8-125.
- 1864 Poche osservazioni zoologiche fatte nella provincia di Terra di Lavoro, pp. 49–54. In: Congresso 91S cientifico Provinciale tenuto in Caserta dall’Accademia degli Aspiranti Naturalisti di Napoli e dalla Reale Società Economica di Terra di Lavoro, Ne’ giorni dal 28 giugno al 5 luglio 1863. Stamperia di Antonio Cons, Napoli. (insert of Annali dell’Accademia degli Aspiranti Naturalisti, Terza serie, volume Terzo, 1863)
- 1864 Poche osservazioni sulla Fauna Salernitana, pp. 57–62. In: Congresso Scientifico Provinciale tenuto in Salerno dall’Accademia degli Aspiranti Naturalisti diNapoli e dalla Reale Società Economica di Principato Citeriore.Dal 29 maggio ai 5 giugno del 1864. Stamperia di Antonio Cons, Napoli. (insert of Annali dell’Accademia degli Aspiranti Naturalisti, Terza serie, volume Quarto)
- 1869 Elenco delle specie immesse nel Museo per acquisti. Nevrotteri. Annuario del Museo Zoologico della R. Università di Napoli, Anno V 1865: 12.
- 1871. Aggiunte alle precedenti Famiglie, 8 pp. In: Costa, A. 1860-70 (see).
- 1871 Elenco delle specie immesse nel Museo per acquisti. Nevrotteri.- Annuario del Museo Zoologico della R.Università di Napoli, Anno VI 1866: 14-16.
- 1874 Una peregrinazione zoologica su’ monti dell’Alburno.- Rendiconto dell’Accademia delle Scienze Fisiche e Matematiche (Sezione della Società Reale di Napoli), Anno XIII fasc. 9°: 129-135.
- 1877 Relazione di un viaggio eseguito nelle Calabrie nella state del 1876, per ricerche zoologiche [Sunto dell’Autore].- Rendiconto dell’ Accademia delle Scienze Fisiche e Matematiche (Sezione della Società Reale di Napoli), Anno XVI fasc. 2°: 40-43.
- 1877.- Degl’Insetti che attaccano l’albero ed il frutto dell’olivo del ciliegio del pero del melo del castagno e della vite e le semenze del pisello della lenticchia della favae del grano loro descrizione e biologia danni che arrecano e mezzi per distruggerli. Edizione seconda riveduta ed accresciuta dallo stesso autore.- Napoli pei tipi del Commendatore G. Nobile. 340 pp., 13 pl.
- 1881 Relazione di un viaggio nelle Calabrie per ricerche zoologiche fatto nella state del 1876. Atti della Reale Accademia delle Scienze Fisiche e Matematiche di Napoli Serie 1a [1882] Vol. IX [fasc. 6], 63 pp.
- 1882 Notizie ed osservazioni sulla Geo-Fauna sarda Memoria Prima Risultamento di ricerche fatte in Sardegna nel Settembre 1881.Atti della Reale Accademia delle Scienze Fisiche e Matematiche di Napoli [1882] Vol. IX(fasc. 11), 41 pp.
- 1882 Rapporto preliminare e sommario sulle ricerche zoologiche fatte in Sardegna durante la primavera del 1882. Rendiconto dell’Accademia delle Scienze Fisiche e Matematiche (Sezione della Società Reale di Napoli), Anno XXI fasc. 10°: 189-201.
- 1883 Notizie ed osservazioni sulla Geo-Fauna sarda Memoria Seconda Risultamento di ricerche fatte in Sardegna nella primavera del 1882.- Atti della Reale Accademia delle Scienze Fisiche e Matematiche di Napoli Serie 2a [1888] Vol. I (fasc. 2), 109 pp.
- 1884 Diagnosi di nuovi Artropodi trovati in Sardegna. Bullettino della Società Entomologica Italiana 15(4): 332-341.
- 1884. Nota intorno i Nevrotteri della Sardegna.Rendiconto dell’Accademia delle Scienze Fisiche e Matematiche(Sezione della Società Reale di Napoli), Anno XXIII fasc. 2°: 20-21. [reprinted in: Rivista scientifico-industriale delle principali scoperte ed invenzioni fatte nelle scienze e nelle industrie, Firenze, Anno Sedicesimo: 122-124]
- 1884 Notizie ed osservazioni sulla Geo-Fauna sarda; memoria terza [Sunto dell’Autore].Rendiconto dell’Accademia delle Scienze Fisiche e Matematiche (Sezione della Società Reale di Napoli), Anno XXIII: 80-81.
- 1884 Notizie ed osservazioni sulla Geo-Fauna sarda Memoria Terza Risultamento di ricerche fatte in Sardegna nella estate del 1883.- Atti della Reale Accademia delle Scienze Fisiche e Matematiche di Napoli Serie 2a[1888] Vol. I (fasc. 9), 64 pp.
- 1884 Notizie ed osservazioni sulla Fauna Sarda.Rivista scientifico-industriale delle principali scoperte ed invenzioni fatte nelle scienze e nelle industrie, Firenze, Anno Sedicesimo: 300-303.
- 1884 Miscellanea entomologica. Memoria prima.Atti della Reale Accademia delle Scienze Fisiche e Matematiche di Napoli Serie 2a [1888] Vol. I (fasc. 10), 11pp., 1 pl.
- 1885 Notizie ed osservazioni sulla Geo-Fauna sarda Memoria Quarta. Atti della Reale Accademia delle Scienze Fisiche e Matematiche di Napoli Serie 2a [1888] Vol. I (fasc. 13), 31 pp.
- 1885 Diagnosi di nuovi Artropodi della Sardegna.Bullettino della Società Entomologica Italiana 17(3/4): 240-255.
- 1886 Notizie ed osservazioni sulla Geo-Fauna sarda Memoria Quinta Risultamento delle ricerche fatte in maggio 1885. Atti della Reale Accademia delle Scienze Fisiche e Matematiche di Napoli Serie 2 a [1888] Vol. II (fasc.7), 24 pp.
- 1886 Notizie ed osservazioni sulla Geo-Fauna sarda Memoria Sesta Risultamento delle ricerche fatte in Sardegna nella State del 1885.Atti della Reale Accademia delle Scienze Fisiche e Matematiche di Napoli Serie 2a [1888] Vol. II (fasc. 8), 40 pp.
- 1874. Fauna Salentina.- Tip. Ed. Salentina, Lecce, Italia. 624 pp.
