= Sylvain Auguste de Marseul =

French entomologist (1812–1890)

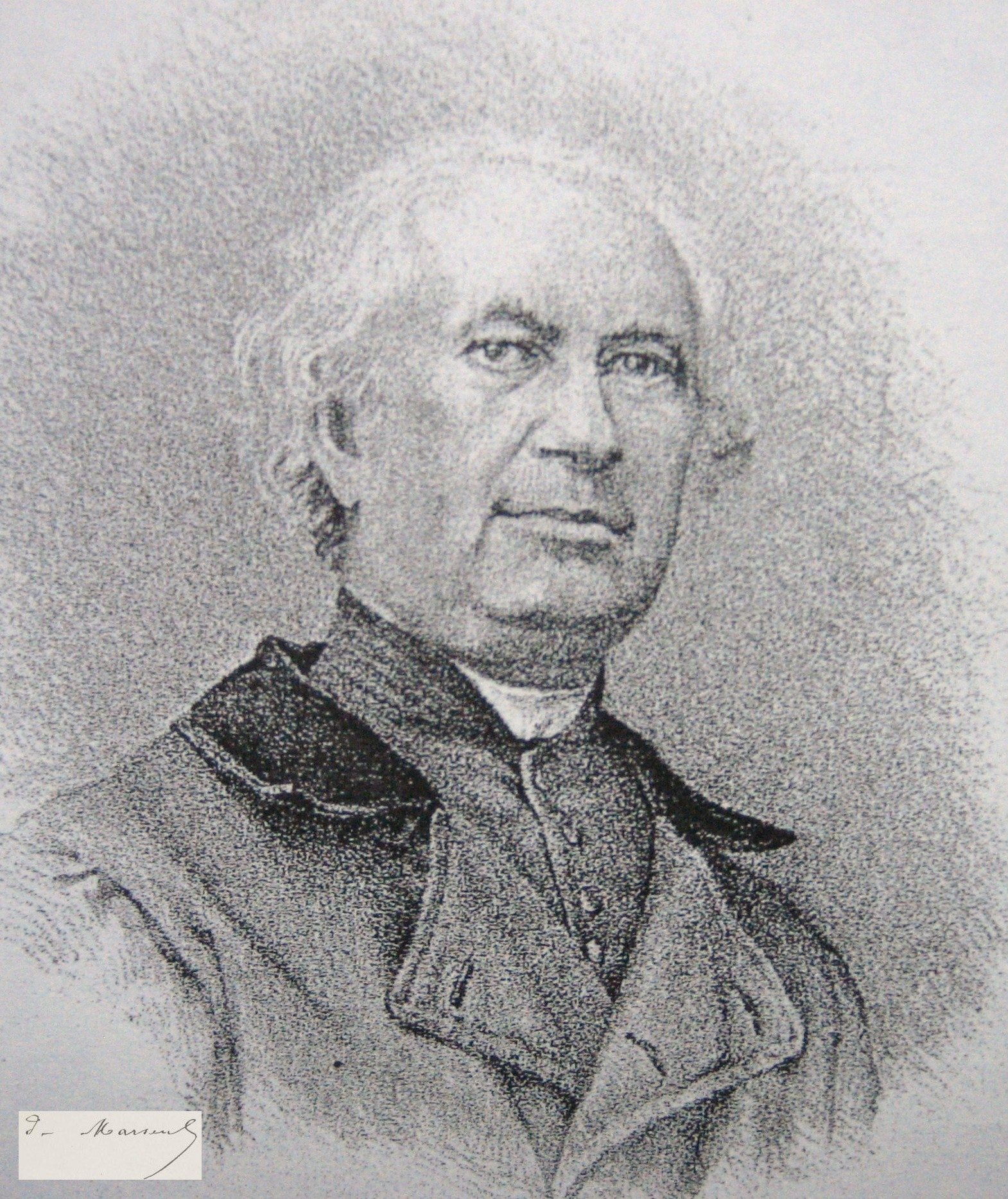
Portrait de Sylvain Auguste de Marseul

Sylvain Auguste de Marseul (January 21, 1812 in Fougerolles-du-Plessis in Normandy – April 16, 1890 in Paris) was a French Roman Catholic priest and entomologist. He taught in the Petit séminaire de Paris from 1833 to 1836. In 1842, founded a college at Laval, then from 1850 to 1853, he taught in Paris. In 1854, he left his college for America where he remained eight months and discovered entomology. The abbot of Marseul was the author of many publications. He founded in 1864 a review devoted to the Coleoptera and named L'Abeille, the Bee. On his death this publication was continued by Ernest Marie Louis Bedel (1849-1922) then by René Gabriel Jeannel (1879-1965). The abbot also studied the history of the beginnings of French entomology in a series of review article in the Bee under the generic title Entomologistes et de leurs écrits, Entomologists and their writings (1882 to 1887). His collection is conserved in the Muséum national d'histoire naturelle and his library in the Société entomologique de France.

== Works ==
- Éléments d'arithmétique raisonnée, à l'usage des frères de Saint-Joseph (Périsse frères, Paris et Lyon, 1839);
- Catalogue des coléoptères d'Europe (Paris, 1857);
- Catalogue des coléoptères d'Europe et du bassin de la Mediterranée en Afrique et en Asie (A. Deyrolle, Paris, 1863);
- Catalogus coleopterorum Europae et confinium (A. Deyrolle, Paris, 1866).

== Sources ==
- Jean Gouillard (2004). Histoire des entomologistes français, 1750-1950. Édition entièrement revue et augmentée. Boubée (Paris) : 287 p.
- Jean Lhoste (1987). Les Entomologistes français. 1750-1950. INRA Éditions : 351 p.

Translated from the French Wikipedia article.
