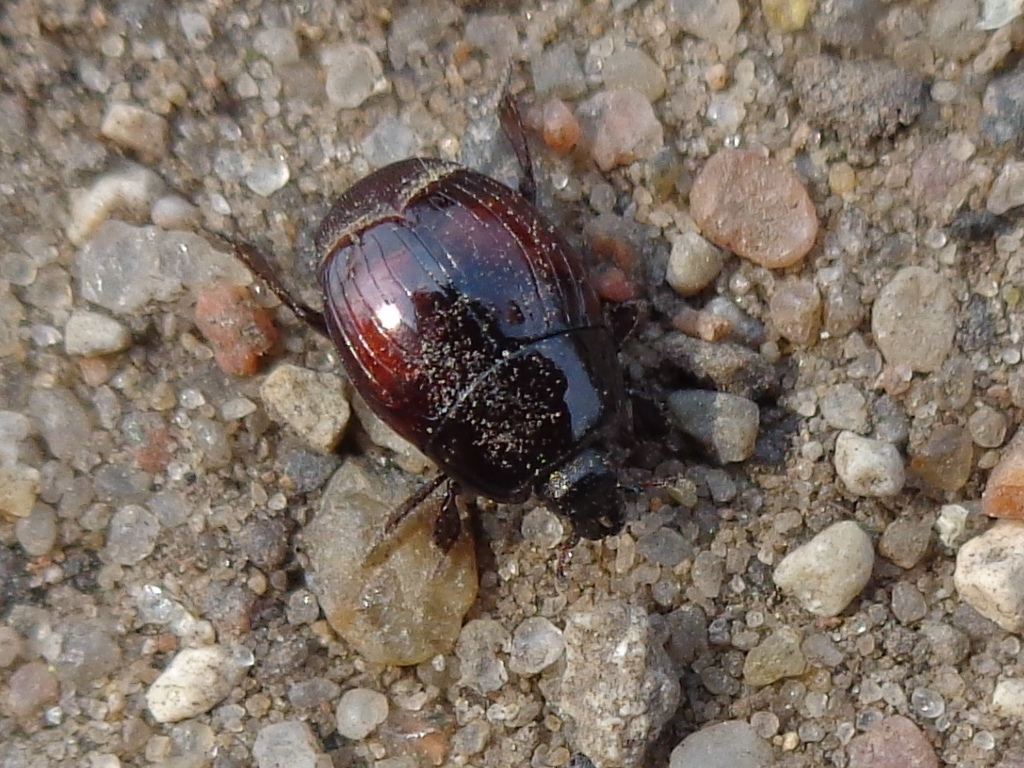
- Margarinotus purpurascens

Scientific classification
- Kingdom: Animalia
- Phylum: Arthropoda
- Class: Insecta
- Order: Coleoptera
- Suborder: Polyphaga
- Infraorder: Staphyliniformia
- Family: Histeridae
- Subfamily: Histerinae
- Tribe: Histerini
- Genus: Margarinotus; Marseul, 1853

= Margarinotus =

Genus of insects

Margarinotus is a genus of clown beetles in the family Histeridae. There are at least 110 described species in Margarinotus.

This genus is mainly characterized by several characters of the male genitalia. Most species may be distinguished by the emarginate outline of the anterior margin of the mesosternum and by the complete inner subhumeral striae on elytra.

== See also ==
- List of Margarinotus species
