= List of Hypocaccus species =

This is a list of 123 species in Hypocaccus, a genus of clown beetles in the family Histeridae.

== Hypocaccus species ==
- Hypocaccus acorni Bousquet and Laplante, 2006^{i c g}
- Hypocaccus acridens (Schmidt, 1890)^{i c g}
- Hypocaccus aequabilis (Reichardt, 1932)^{i c g}
- Hypocaccus ainu Lewis, 1899^{i c g}
- Hypocaccus amabilis (Penati and Vienna, 1995)^{i c g}
- Hypocaccus angulosus (Wollaston, 1864)^{i c g}
- Hypocaccus araneicola (Desbordes, 1930)^{i c g}
- Hypocaccus ascendens (Reichardt, 1932)^{i c g}
- Hypocaccus asiaticus (Mazur, 1975)^{i c g}
- Hypocaccus asticus Lewis, 1911^{i c g}
- Hypocaccus axeli Kryzhanovskij in Kryzhanovskij and Reichardt, 1976^{i c g}
- Hypocaccus balux (Reichardt, 1932)^{i c g}
- Hypocaccus basilewskyi (Thérond, 1955)^{i c g}
- Hypocaccus baudii (Schmidt, 1890)^{i c g}
- Hypocaccus becvari Gomy, 2009^{i c g}
- Hypocaccus beneteaui (Gomy, 1986)^{i c}
- Hypocaccus bigemmeus (J. L. LeConte, 1851)^{i c g b}
- Hypocaccus bigener (J. E. LeConte, 1844)^{i c g b}
- Hypocaccus brahminius (Marseul, 1864)^{i c g}
- Hypocaccus brasiliensis (Paykull, 1811)^{i c g b}
- Hypocaccus callani Thérond, 1958^{i c g}
- Hypocaccus canariensis (Thérond, 1966)^{i c g}
- Hypocaccus consobrinus (Fall, 1901)^{i c g}
- Hypocaccus consputus (Marseul, 1855)^{i c g}
- Hypocaccus controversus (G. Müller, 1937)^{i c g}
- Hypocaccus crassipes (Erichson, 1834)^{i c g}
- Hypocaccus cupreolus (Vienna in Penati and Vienna, 1993)^{i c g}
- Hypocaccus dauricus Reichardt, 1930^{i c g}
- Hypocaccus densus (Casey, 1924)^{i c g}
- Hypocaccus dimidiatipennis (J. E. LeConte, 1824)^{i c g b}
- Hypocaccus dimidiatus (Illiger, 1807)^{i c g}
- Hypocaccus disjunctus (Marseul, 1855)^{i c g}
- Hypocaccus dyolofensis (Gomy, 2004)^{i c g}
- Hypocaccus emendatus (Peyerimhoff, 1917)^{i c g}
- Hypocaccus eremobius (Reichardt, 1932)^{i c g}
- Hypocaccus erosus (Wollaston, 1864)^{i c g}
- Hypocaccus estriatus (J. L. LeConte, 1857)^{i c g b}
- Hypocaccus ferreri (Yélamos, 1992)^{i c g}
- Hypocaccus ferrugineus (Marseul, 1855)^{i c g}
- Hypocaccus fitchi (Marseul, 1862)^{i c g b}
- Hypocaccus fochi (Auzat, 1921)^{i c g}
- Hypocaccus formosus Reichardt, 1941^{i c g}
- Hypocaccus fraternus (Say, 1825)^{i c g b}
- Hypocaccus fugax (Marseul, 1857)^{i c g}
- Hypocaccus fugitivus (Desbordes, 1925)^{i c g}
- Hypocaccus gaudens (J. L. LeConte, 1851)^{i c g b}
- Hypocaccus gemmeus (Lewis, 1888)^{i c g}
- Hypocaccus gienae (Vienna and Kanaar, 1996)^{i c g}
- Hypocaccus grandini (Marseul, 1870)^{i c g}
- Hypocaccus gridellii (G. Müller, 1929)^{i c g}
- Hypocaccus grosclaudei (Normand, 1935)^{i c g}
- Hypocaccus hirsutus Lackner, 2015^{i c g}
- Hypocaccus hosseinius (A. Théry, 1921)^{i c g}
- Hypocaccus interpunctatus (Schmidt, 1885)^{i c g}
- Hypocaccus iris (Fall, 1919)^{i c g b}
- Hypocaccus janatii Gomy in Gomy et al., 2014^{i c g}
- Hypocaccus japhonis (Schmidt, 1890)^{i c g}
- Hypocaccus kidpaddlei Gomy, 2008^{i c g}
- Hypocaccus kincaidi McGrath and Hatch, 1941^{i c g}
- Hypocaccus kiseritzkyi (Reichardt, 1932)^{i c g}
- Hypocaccus kochi (Thérond, 1958)^{i c g}
- Hypocaccus laevis Thérond, 1963^{i c g}
- Hypocaccus lewisii (Schmidt, 1890)^{i c g}
- Hypocaccus lopatini Tishechkin, 2005^{i c g}
- Hypocaccus lucidulus (J. L. LeConte, 1851)^{i c g b}
- Hypocaccus lustrans (Casey, 1926)^{i c g}
- Hypocaccus lyleae Gomy and Vienna, 2011^{i c g}
- Hypocaccus malabaricus (Reichardt, 1932)^{i c g}
- Hypocaccus marginatus (Vienna and Yélamos, 1997)^{i c g}
- Hypocaccus metallicus (Herbst, 1791)^{i c g}
- Hypocaccus minor Dahlgren, 1985^{i c g}
- Hypocaccus mongolicus (Reichardt, 1932)^{i c g}
- Hypocaccus mundus (Wollaston, 1864)^{i c g}
- Hypocaccus nigrocaeruleus (Thérond, 1960)^{i c g}
- Hypocaccus occator (Reichardt, 1932)^{i c g}
- Hypocaccus occidentalis Thérond, 1963^{i c g}
- Hypocaccus omissus (Casey, 1916)^{i c g}
- Hypocaccus orbus (Reichardt, 1932)^{i c g}
- Hypocaccus oxytropis (Reichardt, 1932)^{i c g}
- Hypocaccus paivae (Wollaston, 1867)^{i c g}
- Hypocaccus patruelis (J. E. LeConte, 1845)^{i c g b}
- Hypocaccus pavianus (Bickhardt, 1921)^{i c g}
- Hypocaccus pelleti (Marseul, 1862)^{i c g}
- Hypocaccus penatii Gomy, 2009^{i c g}
- Hypocaccus perparvulus (Desbordes, 1916)^{i c g}
- Hypocaccus persanus (Marseul, 1876)^{i c g}
- Hypocaccus phasanicus (Peyerimhoff, 1946)^{i c g}
- Hypocaccus propensus (Casey, 1893)^{i c g}
- Hypocaccus puncticollis (Küster, 1849)^{i c g}
- Hypocaccus roeri Vienna, 1979^{i c g}
- Hypocaccus rubiciliae Lewis, 1899^{i c g}
- Hypocaccus rubripes (Erichson, 1834)^{i c g}
- Hypocaccus rufipes (Kugelann, 1792)^{i c g}
- Hypocaccus rugiceps (Duftschmid, 1805)^{i c g}
- Hypocaccus rugifrons (Paykull, 1798)^{i c g}
- Hypocaccus schmidti (Théry, 1897)^{i c g}
- Hypocaccus schulzei (Schmidt, 1887)^{i c g}
- Hypocaccus seminitens (J. L. LeConte, 1863)^{i c g b}
- Hypocaccus serrulatus (J. L. LeConte, 1851)^{i c g}
- Hypocaccus servilis (Casey, 1893)^{i c g}
- Hypocaccus simplicisternus (Vienna, 1985)^{i c g}
- Hypocaccus sinae (Marseul, 1862)^{i c g}
- Hypocaccus snizeki Gomy, 2009^{i c g}
- Hypocaccus somaliensis (Vienna, 1990)^{i c g}
- Hypocaccus sparsus (Casey, 1916)^{i c g b}
- Hypocaccus specillum (Marseul, 1855)^{i c g}
- Hypocaccus specularis (Marseul, 1855)^{i c g}
- Hypocaccus speculifer (Vienna, 1994)^{i c g}
- Hypocaccus speculum (Schmidt, 1884)^{i c g}
- Hypocaccus strigithorax Hinton, 1935^{i c g}
- Hypocaccus subaeneus (Schmidt, 1890)^{i c g}
- Hypocaccus teretrioides (Schmidt, 1889)^{i c g}
- Hypocaccus texaco Mazur, 1991^{i c g}
- Hypocaccus tigris (Marseul, 1862)^{i c g}
- Hypocaccus transbaicalicus (Reichardt, 1932)^{i c g}
- Hypocaccus varians (Schmidt, 1890)^{i c g}
- Hypocaccus vernulus (Blackburn, 1903)^{i c g}
- Hypocaccus vethi (Bickhardt, 1912)^{i c g}
- Hypocaccus virescens (Thérond, 1963)^{i c g}
- Hypocaccus vlasovi (Kryzhanovskij, 1966)^{i c g}
- Hypocaccus vulturnus (Reichardt, 1932)^{i c g}
- Hypocaccus wittei (Thérond, 1952)^{i c g}
- Hypocaccus zanzibaricus (Reichardt, 1932)^{i c g}

Data sources: i = ITIS, c = Catalogue of Life, g = GBIF, b = Bugguide.net
