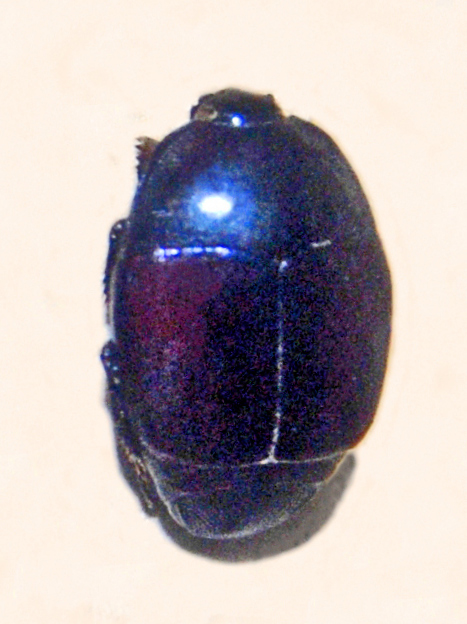
- Saprinus splendens from Somalia. Museum specimen

Scientific classification
- Kingdom: Animalia
- Phylum: Arthropoda
- Clade: Pancrustacea
- Class: Insecta
- Order: Coleoptera
- Suborder: Polyphaga
- Infraorder: Staphyliniformia
- Family: Histeridae
- Subfamily: Saprininae
- Genus: Saprinus
- Species: S. splendens

Binomial name
- Saprinus splendens (Paykull, 1811)

Synonyms
- Saprinus rasselas Marseul, 1855; Hister splendens Paykull, 1811; Hister elegans Paykull, 1811; Saprinus speciosus Erichson, 1834; Hister cyaneus Boisduval, 1835; Saprinus viridicupreus Blanchard, 1853; Saprinus advena Marseul, 1855; Saprinus ovalis Marseul, 1855; Saprinus ater MacLeay, 1864; Saprinus splendens elegans (Paykull, 1811): G. Müller, 1938

= Saprinus splendens =

Species of beetle

Saprinus splendens is a species of clown beetles belonging to the family Histeridae.

== Description ==
This beetle can reach a length of about 3.7–7 millimetres (0.15–0.28 in). Females are longer than males. They are very variable in size, punctation and color. Body is oval, weakly convex and shiny. Pronotum is yellowish-green, while elytra may be shiny dark blue or bottle green or reddish. Elytra show three to four external dorsal striae and a punctation quite variable in density, area and size.

== Distribution ==
This species is widely distributed. It is present from the Republic of South Africa through tropical Africa, Arabia, Kashmir, Afghanistan, Pakistan, most of the Oriental Region and Japan. It has been introduced in Australia from South Africa. It is present in the Northern Territory, Queensland, South and Western Australia.
