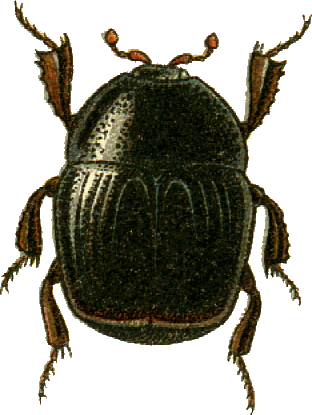
- Gnathoncus rotundatus

Scientific classification
- Kingdom: Animalia
- Phylum: Arthropoda
- Class: Insecta
- Order: Coleoptera
- Suborder: Polyphaga
- Infraorder: Staphyliniformia
- Family: Histeridae
- Subfamily: Saprininae
- Genus: Gnathoncus; Jacquelin-Duval, 1858

= Gnathoncus =

Genus of beetles

Gnathoncus is a genus of clown beetles in the family Histeridae. There are more than 20 described species in Gnathoncus.

== Species ==
These 28 species belong to the genus Gnathoncus:

- Gnathoncus baeckmanni Reichardt, 1941
- Gnathoncus barbatus Bousquet & Laplante, 1999
- Gnathoncus brevisetosus Bousquet & Laplante, 2006
- Gnathoncus brevisternus Lewis, 1907
- Gnathoncus buyssoni Auzat, 1917
- Gnathoncus cavicola Normand, 1949
- Gnathoncus cerberus Auzat, 1923
- Gnathoncus communis (Marseul, 1862)
- Gnathoncus disjunctus Solskiy, 1876
- Gnathoncus ibericus Yélamos, 1992
- Gnathoncus interceptus (J. L. LeConte, 1851)
- Gnathoncus kiritshenkoi Reichardt, 1930
- Gnathoncus moradii Vienna & Ratto, 2013
- Gnathoncus nannetensis (Marseul, 1862)
- Gnathoncus nidorum Stockmann, 1957
- Gnathoncus ovulatus Casey
- Gnathoncus potanini Reitter, 1896
- Gnathoncus procerulus (Erichson, 1834)
- Gnathoncus punctator Reitter, 1896
- Gnathoncus pygmaeus Kryzhanovskij in Kryzhanovskij & Reichardt, 1976
- Gnathoncus rhodiorum (Marseul, 1862)
- Gnathoncus rossi Hatch, 1962
- Gnathoncus rotundatus (Kugelann, 1792)
- Gnathoncus semimarginatus Bickhardt, 1920
- Gnathoncus turkmenicus Olexa, 1992
- Gnathoncus umbrettarum Thérond, 1952
- Gnathoncus vietnamicus Kryzhanovskij, 1972
- Gnathoncus wassilieffi Normand, 1935
