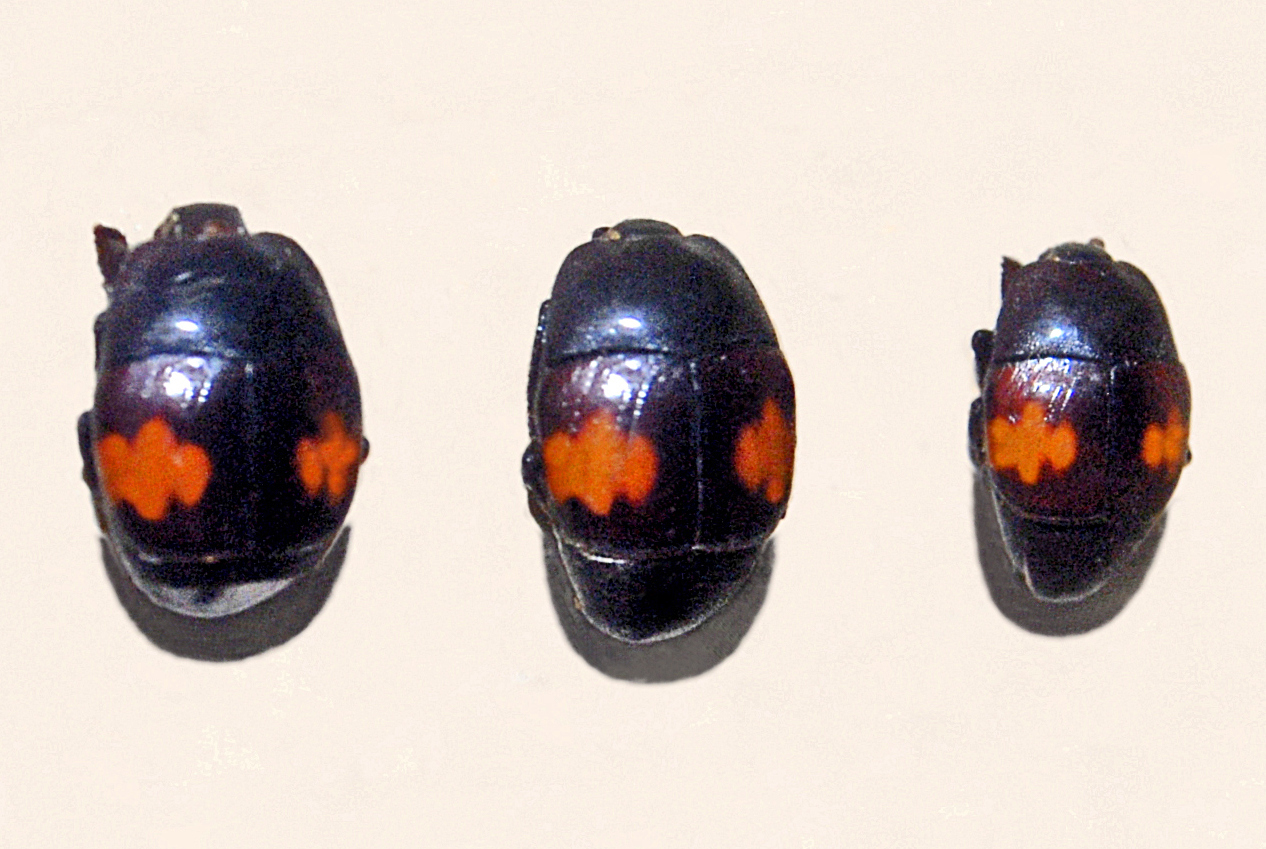
- Saprinus ornatus from Tunisia. Museum specimen

Scientific classification
- Kingdom: Animalia
- Phylum: Arthropoda
- Class: Insecta
- Order: Coleoptera
- Suborder: Polyphaga
- Infraorder: Staphyliniformia
- Family: Histeridae
- Subfamily: Saprininae
- Genus: Saprinus
- Species: S. ornatus

Binomial name
- Saprinus ornatus Erichson, 1834

Synonyms
- Saprinus osiris Marseul, 1862; Hister fasciolatus Gebler, 1845; Saprinus equestris Erichson, 1843

= Saprinus ornatus =

Species of beetle

Saprinus ornatus is a species of clown beetles belonging to the family Histeridae.

== Description ==
These scavenger beetles can reach a length of about 7 millimetres (0.28 in). Elytra are black, with two orange markings.

== Distribution ==
This species is present in the European Turkey, in North Africa, Northern Asia (excluding China) and Southern Asia.
