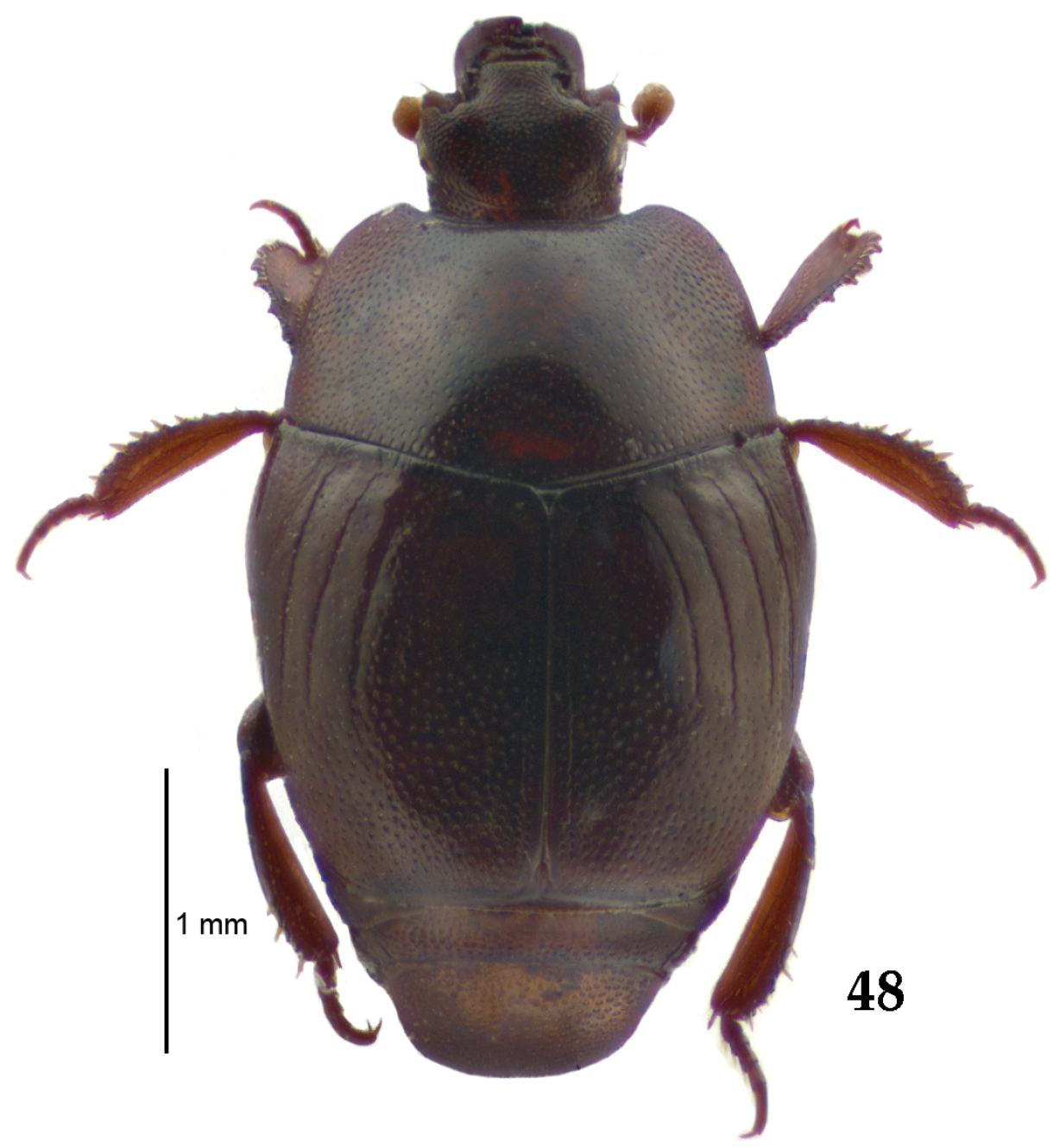
- Euspilotus rubriculus

Scientific classification
- Kingdom: Animalia
- Phylum: Arthropoda
- Class: Insecta
- Order: Coleoptera
- Suborder: Polyphaga
- Infraorder: Staphyliniformia
- Family: Histeridae
- Subfamily: Saprininae
- Genus: Euspilotus; Lewis, 1907

= Euspilotus =

Genus of beetles

Euspilotus is a genus of clown beetles in the family Histeridae. There are more than 80 described species in Euspilotus.

== Species ==
These 87 species belong to the genus Euspilotus:

- Euspilotus aequipunctatus (Horn, 1870)
- Euspilotus alcyonis Bousquet & Laplante, 2006
- Euspilotus alvarengai Arriagada, 2012
- Euspilotus amazonius (Desbordes, 1923)
- Euspilotus arcipygus (Schmidt, 1890)
- Euspilotus argentinus (Marseul, 1870)
- Euspilotus arrogans (Marseul, 1855)
- Euspilotus assimilis (Paykull, 1811)
- Euspilotus aterrimus (Erichson, 1834)
- Euspilotus auctus (Schmidt, 1890)
- Euspilotus azurescens (Marseul, 1855)
- Euspilotus azureus (C.R.Sahlberg, 1823)
- Euspilotus batesoni (Blair, 1933)
- Euspilotus bisignatus (Erichson, 1834)
- Euspilotus blandus (Erichson, 1834)
- Euspilotus bohemanni (Marseul, 1862)
- Euspilotus burgeoisi (Desbordes, 1920)
- Euspilotus caesopygus (Marseul, 1862)
- Euspilotus campechianus (Marseul, 1855)
- Euspilotus canalisticus (Marseul, 1855)
- Euspilotus carinipennis (Desbordes, 1924)
- Euspilotus colombicus (Kirsch, 1889)
- Euspilotus conformis (J. E. LeConte, 1845)
- Euspilotus connectens (Paykull, 1811)
- Euspilotus convexiusculus (Marseul, 1855)
- Euspilotus crenatipes (Solier, 1849)
- Euspilotus cribrum (Casey, 1893)
- Euspilotus cubaecola (Marseul, 1855)
- Euspilotus decoratus (Erichson, 1834)
- Euspilotus detractus (Casey, 1893)
- Euspilotus devius Lewis, 1909
- Euspilotus disnexus (Schmidt, 1890)
- Euspilotus dolatus (Marseul, 1862)
- Euspilotus emys (Marseul, 1870)
- Euspilotus eremita (Marseul, 1870)
- Euspilotus erythropleurus (Marseul, 1855)
- Euspilotus excavata Arriagada, 2012
- Euspilotus flaviclava (Marseul, 1870)
- Euspilotus innubus (Erichson, 1834)
- Euspilotus insertus (J.L.LeConte, 1851)
- Euspilotus insularis (Marseul, 1855)
- Euspilotus inversus (Lewis, 1899)
- Euspilotus jenseni (Bickhardt, 1911)
- Euspilotus lacordairei (Marseul, 1855)
- Euspilotus laesus (Lewis, 1900)
- Euspilotus laridus (J.L.LeConte, 1851)
- Euspilotus latimanus (Schmidt, 1890)
- Euspilotus lentus (Casey, 1893)
- Euspilotus lepidus (Erichson, 1847)
- Euspilotus limatus (Marseul, 1870)
- Euspilotus loebli Mazur, 1974
- Euspilotus malkini (Wenzel, 1960)
- Euspilotus micropunctatus (Hatch, 1962)
- Euspilotus milium (Marseul, 1855)
- Euspilotus minutus (J.E.LeConte, 1844)
- Euspilotus modestus (Erichson, 1834)
- Euspilotus mormonellus (Casey, 1924)
- Euspilotus myrmecophilus (Bickhardt, 1910)
- Euspilotus obductus (J.L.LeConte, 1851)
- Euspilotus ornatus (Blanchard, 1843)
- Euspilotus parenthesis (Schmidt, 1890)
- Euspilotus patagonicus (Blanchard, 1843)
- Euspilotus pavidus (Erichson, 1834)
- Euspilotus perrisi (Marseul, 1872)
- Euspilotus pipitzi (Marseul, 1887)
- Euspilotus placidus (Erichson, 1834)
- Euspilotus prosternalis (Hinton, 1935)
- Euspilotus pusio (Hinton, 1935)
- Euspilotus pygidialis (Lewis, 1903)
- Euspilotus richteri Lewis, 1909
- Euspilotus rossi (Wenzel, 1939)
- Euspilotus rubriculus (Marseul, 1855)
- Euspilotus russatus (Marseul, 1855)
- Euspilotus scissus (J. L. LeConte, 1851)
- Euspilotus scrupularis (J. E. LeConte, 1860)
- Euspilotus simulatus (Blatchley, 1910)
- Euspilotus socius (Casey, 1893)
- Euspilotus spinolae (Solier, 1849)
- Euspilotus sterquilinus (J.E.LeConte, 1860)
- Euspilotus strobeli (Steinheil, 1869)
- Euspilotus subvicinus (Marseul, 1855)
- Euspilotus sydovi (Bickhardt, 1911)
- Euspilotus turikensis Kanaar, 1993
- Euspilotus vinctus (J. L. LeConte, 1851)
- Euspilotus wacoensis (Horn, 1873)
- Euspilotus wenzeli (Mazur, 1984)
- Euspilotus zonalis Lewis, 1907
