= Eremosaprinus minimus =

Scientific classification
- Kingdom: Animalia
- Phylum: Arthropoda
- Class: Insecta
- Order: Coleoptera
- Suborder: Polyphaga
- Infraorder: Staphyliniformia
- Family: Histeridae
- Genus: Eremosaprinus
- Species: E. minimus

Binomial name
- Eremosaprinus minimus Tishechkin & Lackner, 2012

Species of beetle

Eremosaprinus minimus is a species of clown beetle in the family Histeridae. It is found in North America.
