= Hypocaccus patruelis =

Scientific classification
- Kingdom: Animalia
- Phylum: Arthropoda
- Clade: Pancrustacea
- Class: Insecta
- Order: Coleoptera
- Suborder: Polyphaga
- Infraorder: Staphyliniformia
- Family: Histeridae
- Genus: Hypocaccus
- Species: H. patruelis

Binomial name
- Hypocaccus patruelis (J. E. LeConte, 1845)

Species of beetle

Hypocaccus patruelis is a species of clown beetle in the family Histeridae. It is found in North America.
