= Hypocacculus =

Scientific classification
- Kingdom: Animalia
- Phylum: Arthropoda
- Class: Insecta
- Order: Coleoptera
- Suborder: Polyphaga
- Infraorder: Staphyliniformia
- Family: Histeridae
- Subfamily: Saprininae
- Genus: Hypocacculus; Bickhardt, 1914

Genus of beetles

Hypocacculus is a genus of clown beetles in the family Histeridae. There are more than 20 described species in Hypocacculus.

== Species ==
These 22 species belong to the genus Hypocacculus:

- Hypocacculus atrocyaneus (Schmidt, 1888)
- Hypocacculus australis Vienna, 1993
- Hypocacculus biskrensis (Marseul, 1876)
- Hypocacculus caeruleoniger (Desbordes, 1917)
- Hypocacculus congocola Desbordes, 1924
- Hypocacculus curtus (Rosenhauer, 1847)
- Hypocacculus deuvei Gomy & Vienna, 1998
- Hypocacculus elongatulus (Rosenhauer, 1856)
- Hypocacculus gambiensis Dahlgren, 1981
- Hypocacculus harmonicus (Marseul, 1869)
- Hypocacculus hyla (Marseul, 1864)
- Hypocacculus infensus G.Müller, 1937
- Hypocacculus metallescens (Erichson, 1834)
- Hypocacculus praecox (Erichson, 1834)
- Hypocacculus pseudorubricatus Vienna, 1993
- Hypocacculus rubricatus (Lewis, 1899)
- Hypocacculus simillimus Vienna, 1993
- Hypocacculus simulans Vienna, 1993
- Hypocacculus simulator G.Müller, 1944
- Hypocacculus solieri (Marseul, 1862)
- Hypocacculus spretulus (Erichson, 1834)
- Hypocacculus virens Dahlgren, 1973
