= Euspilotus azurescens =

Scientific classification
- Kingdom: Animalia
- Phylum: Arthropoda
- Class: Insecta
- Order: Coleoptera
- Suborder: Polyphaga
- Infraorder: Staphyliniformia
- Family: Histeridae
- Genus: Euspilotus
- Species: E. azurescens

Binomial name
- Euspilotus azurescens (Marseul, 1855)

Species of beetle

Euspilotus azurescens is a species of clown beetle in the family Histeridae. It is found in Central America, North America, and South America.
