= Xerosaprinus psyche =

Scientific classification
- Kingdom: Animalia
- Phylum: Arthropoda
- Class: Insecta
- Order: Coleoptera
- Suborder: Polyphaga
- Infraorder: Staphyliniformia
- Family: Histeridae
- Genus: Xerosaprinus
- Species: X. psyche

Binomial name
- Xerosaprinus psyche (Casey, 1916)

Species of beetle

Xerosaprinus psyche is a species of clown beetle in the family Histeridae. It is found in Central America and North America.
