= Geomysaprinus moniliatus =

Scientific classification
- Kingdom: Animalia
- Phylum: Arthropoda
- Class: Insecta
- Order: Coleoptera
- Suborder: Polyphaga
- Infraorder: Staphyliniformia
- Family: Histeridae
- Genus: Geomysaprinus
- Species: G. moniliatus

Binomial name
- Geomysaprinus moniliatus (Casey, 1916)

Species of beetle

Geomysaprinus moniliatus is a species of clown beetle in the family Histeridae. It is found in North America.
