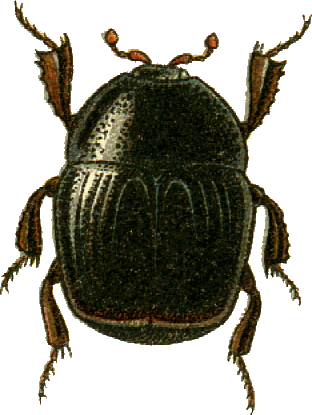

Scientific classification
- Kingdom: Animalia
- Phylum: Arthropoda
- Clade: Pancrustacea
- Class: Insecta
- Order: Coleoptera
- Suborder: Polyphaga
- Infraorder: Staphyliniformia
- Family: Histeridae
- Genus: Gnathoncus
- Species: G. rotundatus

Binomial name
- Gnathoncus rotundatus (Kugelann, 1792)

Synonyms
- Gnathoncus nanus (Scriba 1790); Gnathoncus ovatulus Casey 1916

= Gnathoncus rotundatus =

Species of beetle

Gnathoncus rotundatus is a species of clown beetle in the family Histeridae. It is found in Europe and Northern Asia (excluding China), North America, South America, and Southern Asia.
