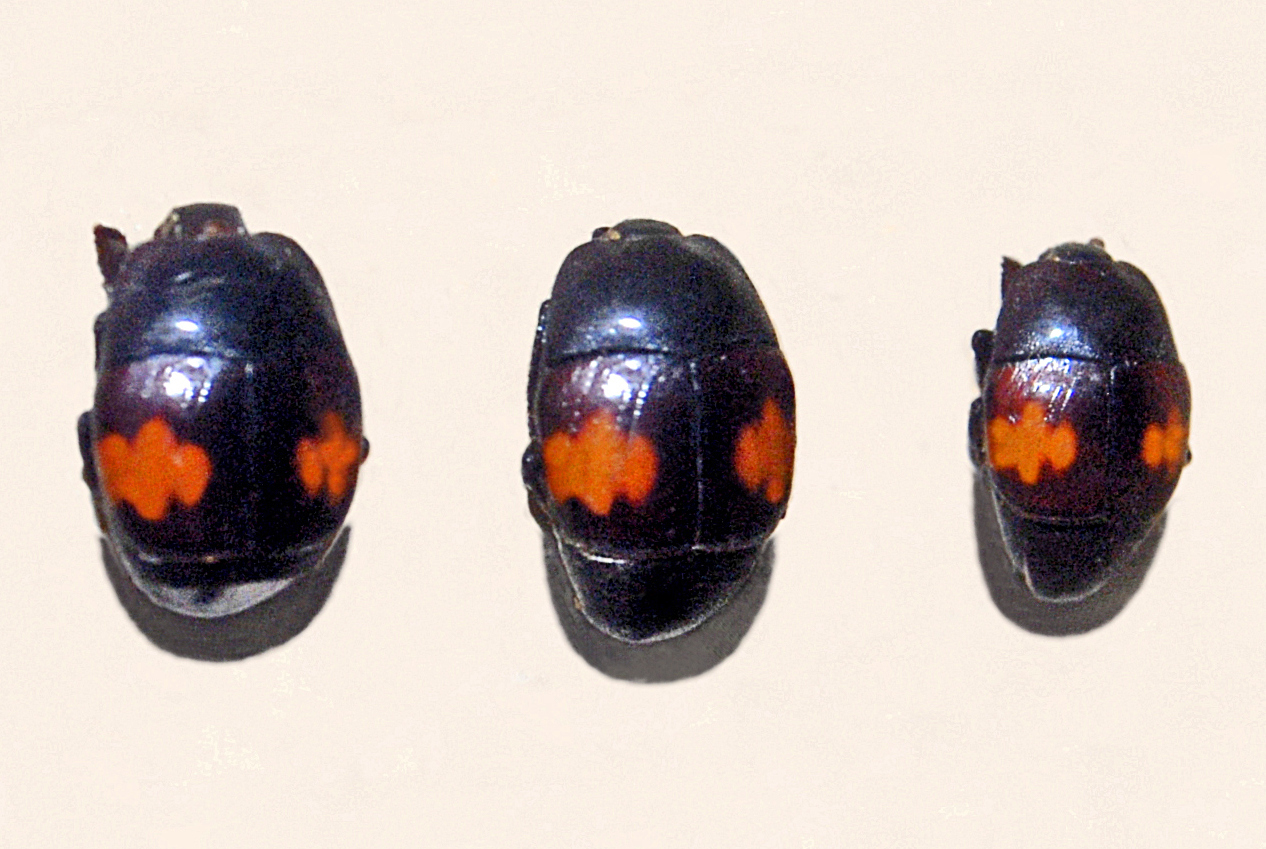
- Saprinus ornatus

Scientific classification
- Kingdom: Animalia
- Phylum: Arthropoda
- Class: Insecta
- Order: Coleoptera
- Suborder: Polyphaga
- Infraorder: Staphyliniformia
- Family: Histeridae
- Subfamily: Saprininae
- Genus: Saprinus; Erichson, 1834

Synonyms
- Phaonius Reichardt, 1941

= Saprinus =

Genus of beetles

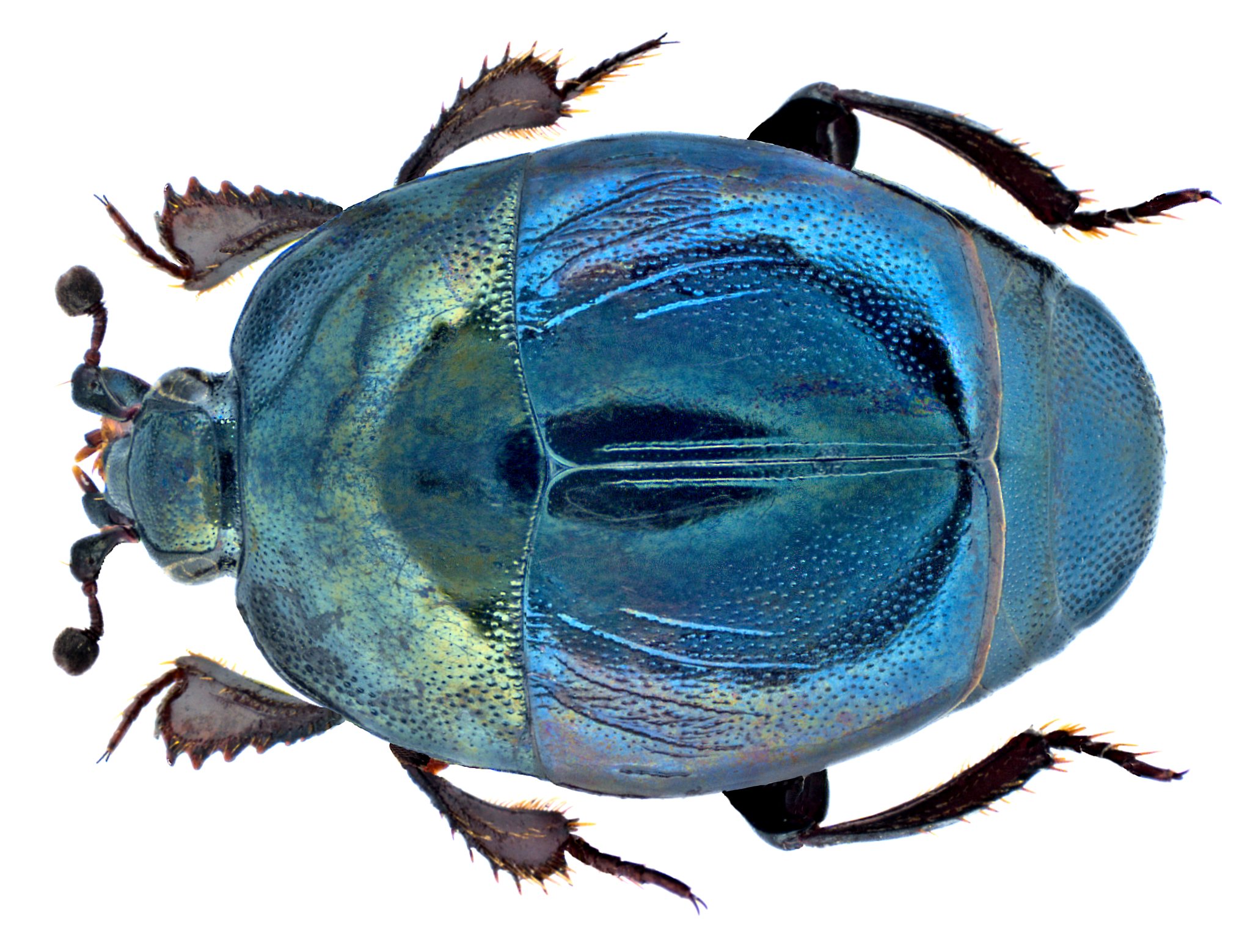
Saprinus splendens

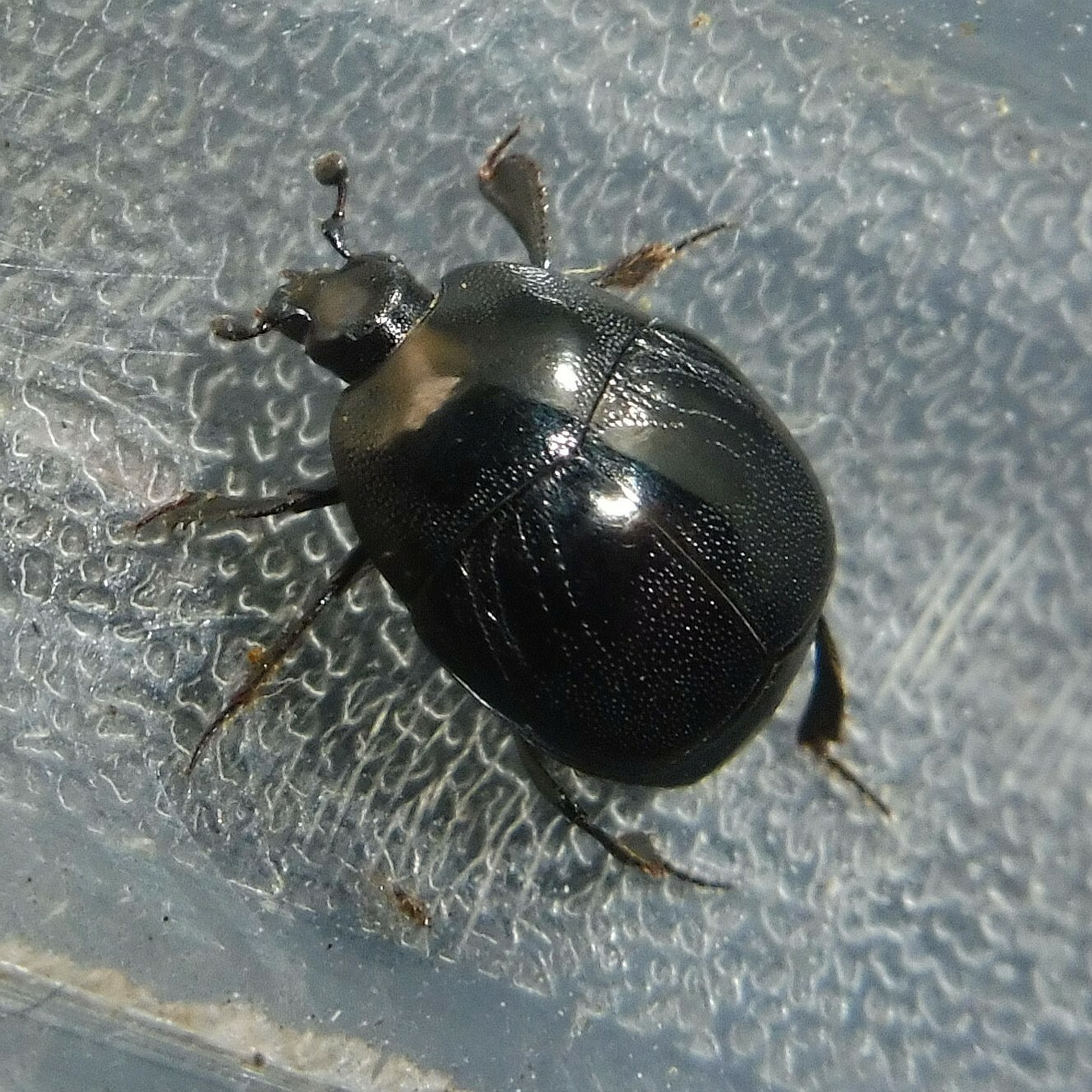
Saprinus semistriatus, UK

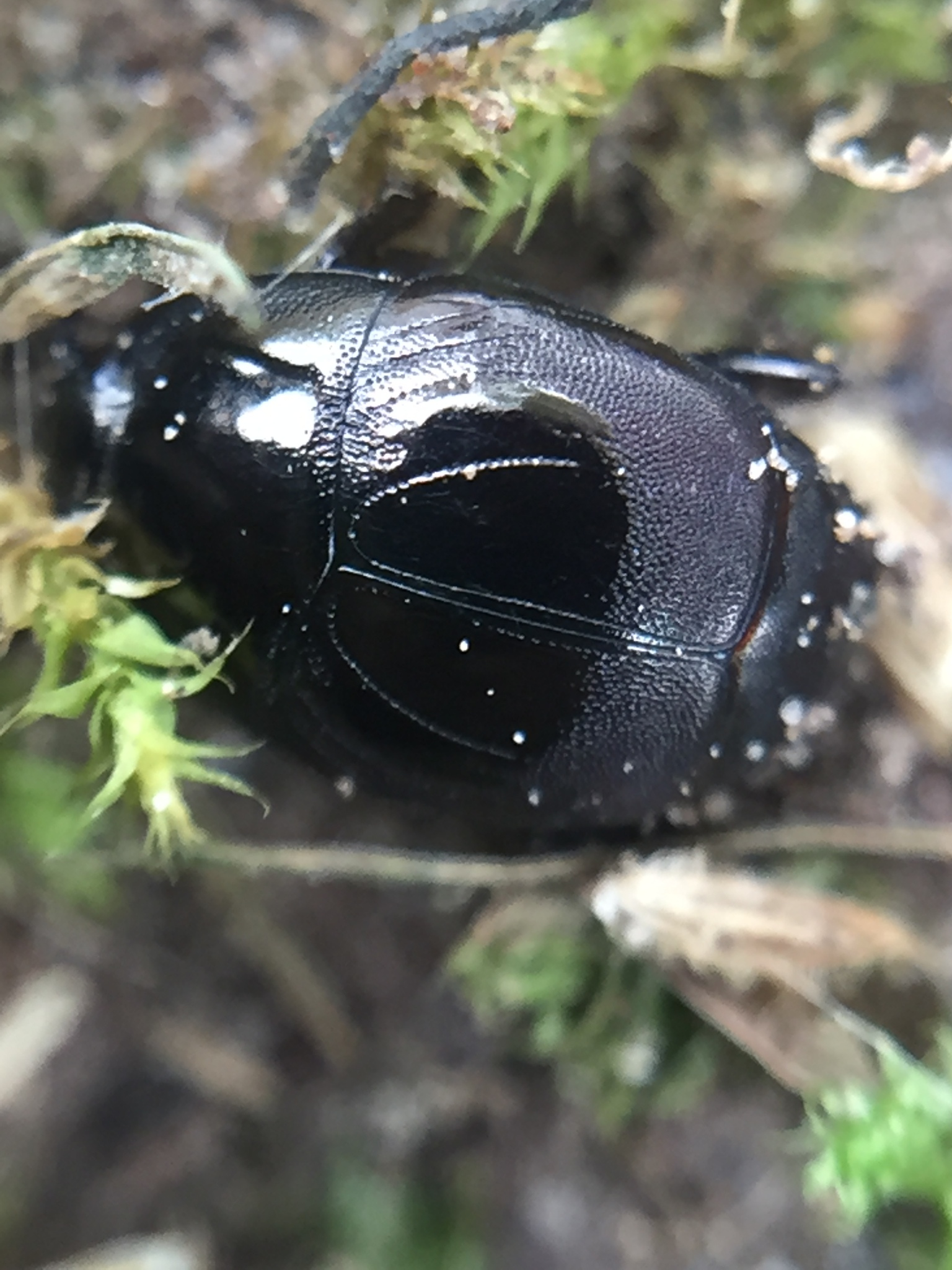
Saprinus detritus, New Zealand

Saprinus is a genus of clown beetles belonging to the family Histeridae. There are more than 200 described species in Saprinus. They are found on every continent except Antarctica.

== Species ==
These 208 species belong to Saprinus.

- Saprinus aberlenci Gomy & Vienna, 1994
- Saprinus acilinea Marseul, 1862
- Saprinus acuminatus (Fabricius, 1798)
- Saprinus addendus Dahlgren, 1964
- Saprinus aegialius Reitter, 1884
- Saprinus aegyptiacus Marseul, 1855
- Saprinus aeneolus Marseul, 1870
- Saprinus aeneus (Fabricius, 1775)
- Saprinus aequalis Walker, 1871
- Saprinus aeratus Erichson, 1834
- Saprinus africanus Dahlgren, 1969
- Saprinus algericus (Paykull, 1811)
- Saprinus alienus LeConte, J. L., 1851
- Saprinus amethystinus Lewis, 1900
- Saprinus apteli Chobaut, 1922
- Saprinus artensis Marseul, 1862
- Saprinus auricollis Marseul, 1855
- Saprinus austerus Reichardt, 1930
- Saprinus australis (Boisduval, 1835)
- Saprinus basalis Fairmaire, 1898
- Saprinus beduinus Marseul, 1862
- Saprinus bicolor (Olivier, A. G., 1789)
- Saprinus bicoloroides Dahlgren, 1964
- Saprinus biguttatus (Steven, 1806)
- Saprinus bimaculatus Dahlgren, 1964
- Saprinus biplagiatus Ballion, 1871
- Saprinus bispeculatus Casey, 1916
- Saprinus blissonii Marseul, 1855
- Saprinus bousaadensis Dahlgren, 1974
- Saprinus brenskei Reitter, 1884
- Saprinus brunnivestis Marseul, 1855
- Saprinus buqueti Marseul, 1855
- Saprinus caerulescens (Hoffmann, 1803)
- Saprinus calatravensis Fuente, 1899
- Saprinus cariniceps Müller, G., 1944
- Saprinus cavalieri Marseul, 1855
- Saprinus centralis Dahlgren, 1971
- Saprinus chalcites (Illiger, 1807)
- Saprinus chathamensis Lackner & Leschen, 2017
- Saprinus chiliensis Marseul, 1855
- Saprinus ciliatoides Fall, 1917
- Saprinus ciliatus LeConte, J. L., 1851
- Saprinus coerulescens LeConte, J. L., 1851
- Saprinus concinnus (Gebler, 1830)
- Saprinus confalonierii Müller, G., 1933
- Saprinus corpulentus (Motschulsky, 1845)
- Saprinus cribellatus Marseul, 1855
- Saprinus cruciatus (Fabricius, 1792)
- Saprinus crypticus Dahlgren, 1967
- Saprinus cupratus Kolenati, 1846
- Saprinus cupreus Erichson, 1834
- Saprinus cyaneus (Fabricius, 1775)
- Saprinus cyprius Dahlgren, 1981
- Saprinus dahlgreni Vienna, 1996
- Saprinus delta Marseul, 1862
- Saprinus desertoides McGrath & Hatch, 1941
- Saprinus detersus (Illiger, 1807)
- Saprinus detritus (Fabricius, 1775)
- Saprinus diptychus Marseul, 1855
- Saprinus discoidalis LeConte, J. L., 1851
- Saprinus distinctus (Dégallier, 1993)
- Saprinus distinguendus Marseul, 1855
- Saprinus divergens Dahlgren, 1967
- Saprinus diversegenitalis Olexa, 1992
- Saprinus dussaulti Marseul, 1870
- Saprinus effusus Casey, 1916
- Saprinus erbilensis Abdulla, Ahmmed, Mawlood & Omar., 2021
- Saprinus erichsonii Marseul, 1855
- Saprinus exiguus Vienna, 1993
- Saprinus externus (Fischer de Waldheim, 1824)
- Saprinus falcifer (Lewis, 1891)
- Saprinus fallaciosus Müller, G., 1937
- Saprinus felipae Lewis, 1913
- Saprinus figuratus Marseul, 1855
- Saprinus fimbriatus LeConte, J. L., 1851
- Saprinus flavipennis Péringuey, 1885
- Saprinus fraterculus Müller, G., 1944
- Saprinus fraudulentus Müller, G., 1944
- Saprinus frontistrius Marseul, 1855
- Saprinus fulgidicollis Marseul, 1855
- Saprinus fulgidus LeConte, J. E., 1860
- Saprinus funebris Vienna, 1996
- Saprinus furvus Erichson, 1834
- Saprinus gageti Peyerimhoff, 1943
- Saprinus gambiensis Dahlgren, 1972
- Saprinus georgicus Marseul, 1862
- Saprinus gilvicornis Erichson, 1834
- Saprinus godet (Brullé, 1832)
- Saprinus goergeni Gomy, 2000
- Saprinus graculus Reichardt, 1929
- Saprinus grandiclava Kanaar, 1989
- Saprinus guyanensis Marseul, 1855
- Saprinus hansmuhlei Gomy & Vienna, 2012
- Saprinus havajirii Kapler, 2000
- Saprinus hidalgo (Mazur, 1990)
- Saprinus himalajicus Dahlgren, 1971
- Saprinus ignotus Marseul, 1855
- Saprinus immundus (Gyllenhal, 1827)
- Saprinus imperfectus LeConte, J. E., 1844
- Saprinus impressus LeConte, J. E., 1844
- Saprinus inausus Marseul, 1862
- Saprinus infimus Vienna, 1997
- Saprinus inflatus Vienna, 1981
- Saprinus interruptus (Paykull, 1811)
- Saprinus intractabilis Reichardt, 1929
- Saprinus intricatus Erichson, 1843
- Saprinus intritus Casey, 1893
- Saprinus jacobsoni Reichardt, 1923
- Saprinus kaszabianus Dahlgren, 1971
- Saprinus labordei Lackner & Gomy, 2016
- Saprinus laciniatus Casey, 1916
- Saprinus laetus Erichson, 1834
- Saprinus lateralis Motschulsky, 1849
- Saprinus lautus Erichson, 1839
- Saprinus lepidulus Broun, 1881
- Saprinus lopatini Kryzhanovskij & Tishechkin, 1994
- Saprinus lubricus LeConte, J. L., 1851
- Saprinus lucemseductus Kanaar, 2008
- Saprinus lugens Erichson, 1834 (Clown beetle)
- Saprinus lutshniki Kryzhanovskij, 1976
- Saprinus maculatus (Rossi, P., 1792)
- Saprinus magnoguttatus Müller, G., 1937
- Saprinus martini Fall, 1917
- Saprinus melas Küster, 1849
- Saprinus mirabilis (Vienna, 1994)
- Saprinus moyses Marseul, 1862
- Saprinus multistriatus Roth, 1851
- Saprinus namibiensis Thérond & Vienna, 1983
- Saprinus neglectus Marseul, 1855
- Saprinus niger Motschulsky, 1849
- Saprinus niponicus Dahlgren, 1962
- Saprinus nitiduloides Fairmaire, 1883
- Saprinus nitidus (Wiedemann, 1825)
- Saprinus nobilis Wollaston, 1864
- Saprinus optabilis Marseul, 1855
- Saprinus orbiculatus Marseul, 1855
- Saprinus oregonensis LeConte, J. E., 1844
- Saprinus ornatus Erichson, 1834
- Saprinus pacificus Lackner & Leschen, 2017
- Saprinus pamiricus Reichardt, 1930
- Saprinus pecuinus Marseul, 1855
- Saprinus pedator Sharp, 1876
- Saprinus pensylvanicus (Paykull, 1811)
- Saprinus perinterruptus Marseul, 1855
- Saprinus pharao Marseul, 1855
- Saprinus planisternus Marseul, 1862
- Saprinus planiusculus Motschulsky, 1849
- Saprinus plenus LeConte, J. L., 1851
- Saprinus politus (Brahm, 1790)
- Saprinus prasinus Erichson, 1834
- Saprinus profusus Casey, 1893
- Saprinus proximus Wollaston, 1864
- Saprinus pseudobicolor Marseul, 1855
- Saprinus pseudodetritus Lackner & Leschen, 2017
- Saprinus psyche Casey, 1916
- Saprinus pulcher Bickhardt, 1911
- Saprinus punctatissimus Erichson, 1834
- Saprinus punctulatus (Olivier, A. G., 1789)
- Saprinus purpuricollis Schmidt, J. E. F., 1890
- Saprinus quadriguttatus (Fabricius, 1798)
- Saprinus rarus Lackner & Leschen, 2017
- Saprinus rhodesiae Reichardt, 1933
- Saprinus rhytipterus Marseul, 1862
- Saprinus robustus Krása, 1944
- Saprinus ruber Marseul, 1855
- Saprinus rufulus (Faldermann, 1838)
- Saprinus rugifer (Paykull, 1809)
- Saprinus rugipennis Marseul, 1855
- Saprinus russatus Marseul, 1855
- Saprinus scabriceps Casey, 1916
- Saprinus secchii Théry, T., 2009
- Saprinus sedakovii Motschulsky, 1860
- Saprinus semiopacus Schmidt, J. E. F., 1894
- Saprinus semirosus Marseul, 1870
- Saprinus semistriatus (Scriba, L. G., 1790)
- Saprinus simplicifrons Müller, G., 1944
- Saprinus simplicipennis Dahlgren, 1969
- Saprinus sinaiticus Crotch, 1872
- Saprinus spernax Marseul, 1862
- Saprinus splendens (Paykull, 1811)
- Saprinus steppensis Marseul, 1862
- Saprinus sternifossa Müller, G., 1937
- Saprinus strigil Marseul, 1855
- Saprinus stussineri Reitter, 1909
- Saprinus subcoerulus Thérond, 1978
- Saprinus subdiptychus Marseul, 1870
- Saprinus submarginatus Sahlberg, J., 1913
- Saprinus subnitescens Bickhardt, 1909
- Saprinus subustus Marseul, 1855
- Saprinus subvirescens (Ménétriés, 1832)
- Saprinus suturalis Marseul, 1862
- Saprinus tenuistrius Marseul, 1855
- Saprinus testudo Casey, 1916
- Saprinus turcomanicus Ménétriés, 1847
- Saprinus tyrrhenus Blackburn, 1903
- Saprinus uvarovi Müller, G., 1954
- Saprinus vafer Marseul, 1855
- Saprinus vatovai Müller, G., 1944
- Saprinus versicolor Marseul, 1855
- Saprinus vestitus LeConte, J. L., 1851
- Saprinus viator Marseul, 1855
- Saprinus virescens (Paykull, 1798)
- Saprinus viridanus Lewis, 1899
- Saprinus viridicatus Schmidt, J. E. F., 1894
- Saprinus viridipennis Lewis, 1901
- Saprinus vitiosus LeConte, J. L., 1851
- Saprinus walkeri Bickhardt, 1910
- Saprinus wenzeli (Bousquet & Laplante, 2006)
