= Euspilotus cribrum =

Scientific classification
- Kingdom: Animalia
- Phylum: Arthropoda
- Class: Insecta
- Order: Coleoptera
- Suborder: Polyphaga
- Infraorder: Staphyliniformia
- Family: Histeridae
- Genus: Euspilotus
- Species: E. cribrum

Binomial name
- Euspilotus cribrum (Casey, 1893)

Species of beetle

Euspilotus cribrum is a species of clown beetle in the family Histeridae. It is found in North America.
