= Euspilotus scissus =

Scientific classification
- Kingdom: Animalia
- Phylum: Arthropoda
- Clade: Pancrustacea
- Class: Insecta
- Order: Coleoptera
- Suborder: Polyphaga
- Infraorder: Staphyliniformia
- Family: Histeridae
- Genus: Euspilotus
- Species: E. scissus

Binomial name
- Euspilotus scissus (J. L. LeConte, 1851)

Species of beetle

Euspilotus scissus is a species of clown beetle in the family Histeridae. It is found in North America.
