= Neopachylopus sulcifrons =

Scientific classification
- Kingdom: Animalia
- Phylum: Arthropoda
- Class: Insecta
- Order: Coleoptera
- Suborder: Polyphaga
- Infraorder: Staphyliniformia
- Family: Histeridae
- Genus: Neopachylopus
- Species: N. sulcifrons

Binomial name
- Neopachylopus sulcifrons (Mannerheim, 1843)

Species of beetle

Neopachylopus Sulcifrons is a species of Clown beetle in the family Histeridae. It is found in Central and North America.
