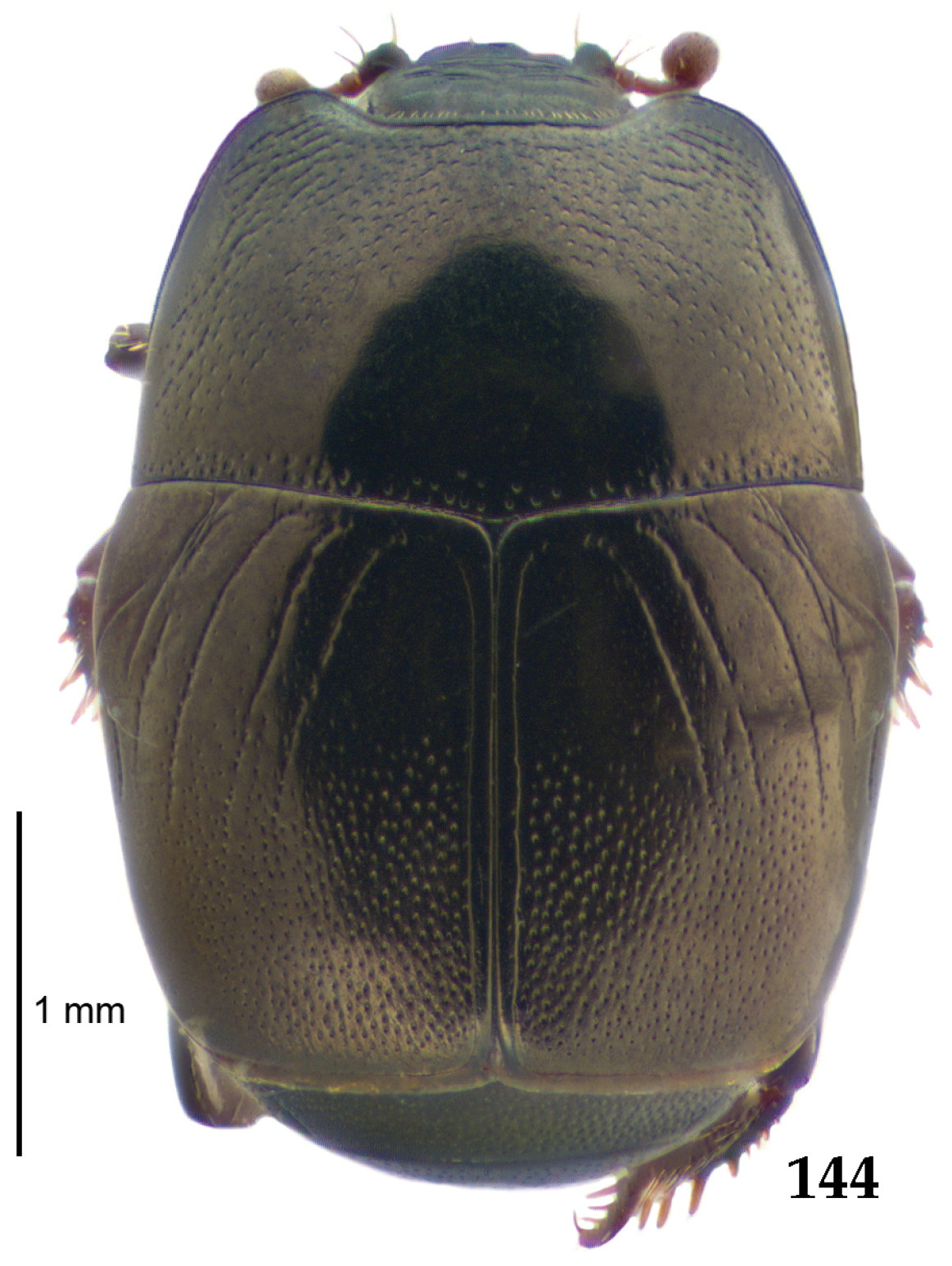

Scientific classification
- Kingdom: Animalia
- Phylum: Arthropoda
- Class: Insecta
- Order: Coleoptera
- Suborder: Polyphaga
- Infraorder: Staphyliniformia
- Family: Histeridae
- Genus: Hypocaccus
- Species: H. brasiliensis

Binomial name
- Hypocaccus brasiliensis (Paykull, 1811)

= Hypocaccus brasiliensis =

Species of beetle

Hypocaccus brasiliensis is a species of clown beetle in the family Histeridae. It is found in Africa, Europe and Northern Asia (excluding China), Central America, South America, and Southern Asia.
