= Xerosaprinus ignotus =

Scientific classification
- Kingdom: Animalia
- Phylum: Arthropoda
- Class: Insecta
- Order: Coleoptera
- Suborder: Polyphaga
- Infraorder: Staphyliniformia
- Family: Histeridae
- Genus: Xerosaprinus
- Species: X. ignotus

Binomial name
- Xerosaprinus ignotus (Marseul, 1855)

Species of beetle

Xerosaprinus ignotus is a species of clown beetle in the family Histeridae. It is found in Central America and South America.
