= Saprinus felipae =

Scientific classification
- Kingdom: Animalia
- Phylum: Arthropoda
- Class: Insecta
- Order: Coleoptera
- Suborder: Polyphaga
- Infraorder: Staphyliniformia
- Family: Histeridae
- Genus: Saprinus
- Species: S. felipae

Binomial name
- Saprinus felipae Lewis, 1913

Species of beetle

Saprinus felipae is a species of clown beetle in the family Histeridae. It is found in North America.
