= Eremosaprinus =

Scientific classification
- Kingdom: Animalia
- Phylum: Arthropoda
- Class: Insecta
- Order: Coleoptera
- Suborder: Polyphaga
- Infraorder: Staphyliniformia
- Family: Histeridae
- Subfamily: Saprininae
- Genus: Eremosaprinus; Ross, 1939

Genus of beetles

Eremosaprinus is a genus of clown beetles in the family Histeridae. There are about 10 described species in Eremosaprinus.

== Species ==
These 10 species belong to the genus Eremosaprinus:

- Eremosaprinus baja Tishechkin & Lackner, 2012
- Eremosaprinus distinctus Lundgren in Johnson et al., 1992
- Eremosaprinus falli (Ross, 1939)
- Eremosaprinus hubbardi (Wenzel, 1939)
- Eremosaprinus minimus Tishechkin & Lackner, 2012
- Eremosaprinus opacus (Horn, 1894)
- Eremosaprinus rossi Tishechkin & Lackner, 2012
- Eremosaprinus unguiculatus (Ross, 1939)
- Eremosaprinus verityi Tishechkin & Lackner, 2012
- Eremosaprinus warneri Lackner & Tishechkin, 2014
