= Hypocacculus metallescens =

Scientific classification
- Kingdom: Animalia
- Phylum: Arthropoda
- Class: Insecta
- Order: Coleoptera
- Suborder: Polyphaga
- Infraorder: Staphyliniformia
- Family: Histeridae
- Genus: Hypocacculus
- Species: H. metallescens

Binomial name
- Hypocacculus metallescens (Erichson, 1834)

Species of beetle

Hypocacculus metallescens is a species of clown beetle in the family Histeridae. It is found in Africa, Europe and Northern Asia (excluding China), and North America.
