= Chelyoxenus =

Scientific classification
- Kingdom: Animalia
- Phylum: Arthropoda
- Class: Insecta
- Order: Coleoptera
- Suborder: Polyphaga
- Infraorder: Staphyliniformia
- Family: Histeridae
- Subfamily: Saprininae
- Genus: Chelyoxenus; Hubbard, 1894

Genus of beetles

Chelyoxenus is a genus of clown beetles in the family Histeridae. There are at least three described species in Chelyoxenus.

== Species ==
These three species belong to the genus Chelyoxenus:

- Chelyoxenus insolitus Casey
- Chelyoxenus repens Casey
- Chelyoxenus xerobatis Hubbard, 1894 (gopher tortoise hister beetle)
