= Geomysaprinus posthumus =

Scientific classification
- Kingdom: Animalia
- Phylum: Arthropoda
- Class: Insecta
- Order: Coleoptera
- Suborder: Polyphaga
- Infraorder: Staphyliniformia
- Family: Histeridae
- Genus: Geomysaprinus
- Species: G. posthumus

Binomial name
- Geomysaprinus posthumus (Marseul, 1855)

Species of beetle

Geomysaprinus posthumus is a species of clown beetle in the family Histeridae. It is found in Central America and North America.
