= Euspilotus rossi =

Scientific classification
- Kingdom: Animalia
- Phylum: Arthropoda
- Class: Insecta
- Order: Coleoptera
- Suborder: Polyphaga
- Infraorder: Staphyliniformia
- Family: Histeridae
- Genus: Euspilotus
- Species: E. rossi

Binomial name
- Euspilotus rossi (Wenzel, 1939)

Species of beetle

Euspilotus rossi is a species of clown beetle in the family Histeridae. It is found in North America.
