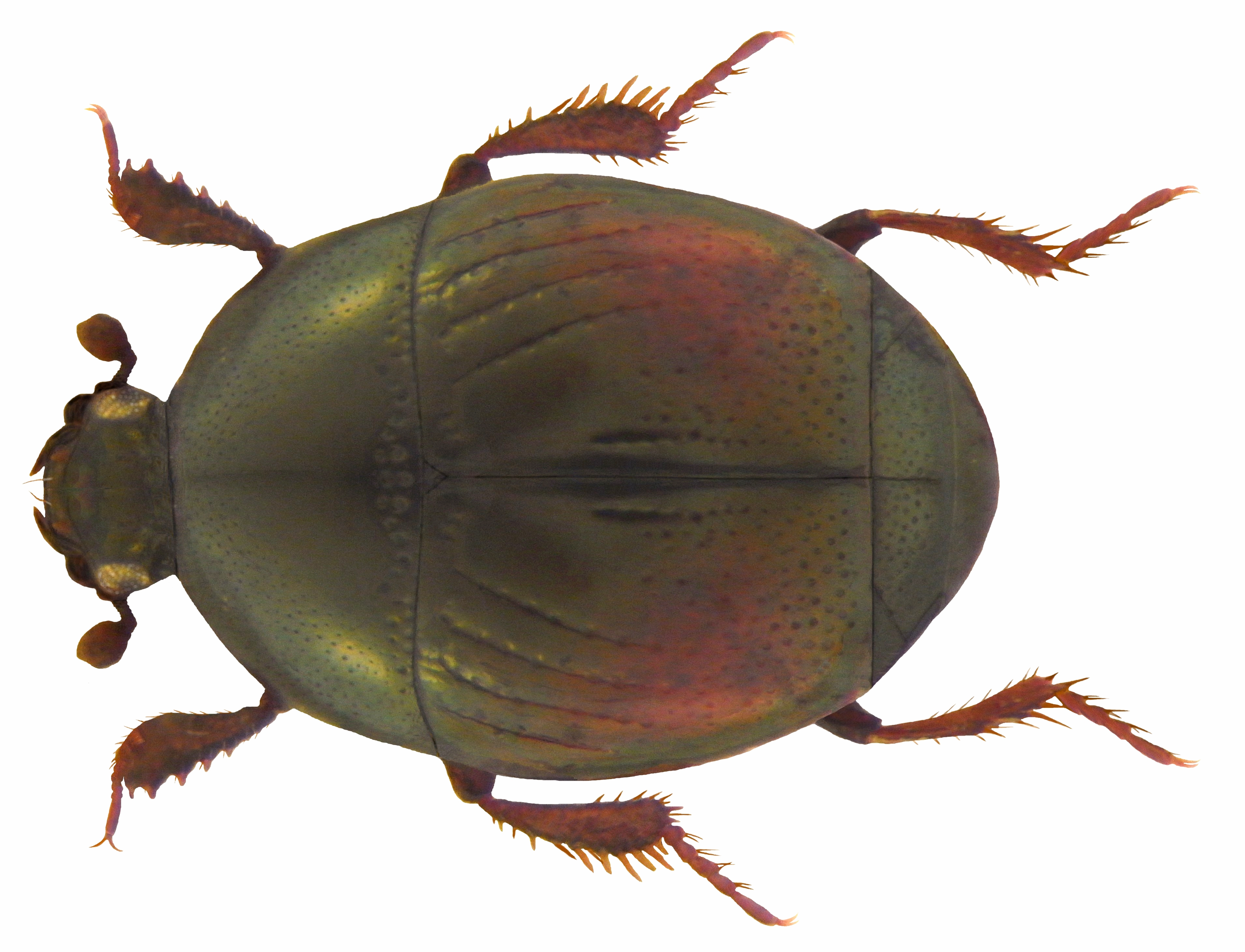
- Chalcionellus krikkeni

Scientific classification
- Domain: Eukaryota
- Kingdom: Animalia
- Phylum: Arthropoda
- Class: Insecta
- Order: Coleoptera
- Suborder: Polyphaga
- Infraorder: Staphyliniformia
- Family: Histeridae
- Subfamily: Saprininae
- Genus: Chalcionellus; Reichardt, 1932

Synonyms
- Izpaniolus Mazur, 1972

= Chalcionellus =

Genus of beetles

Chalcionellus is a genus of beetles belonging to the family Histeridae.

The genus was first described by Reichardt in 1932.

The species of this genus are found in Europe and Northern Africa.

Species:

- Chalcionellus decemstriatus (Rossi, 1792)
