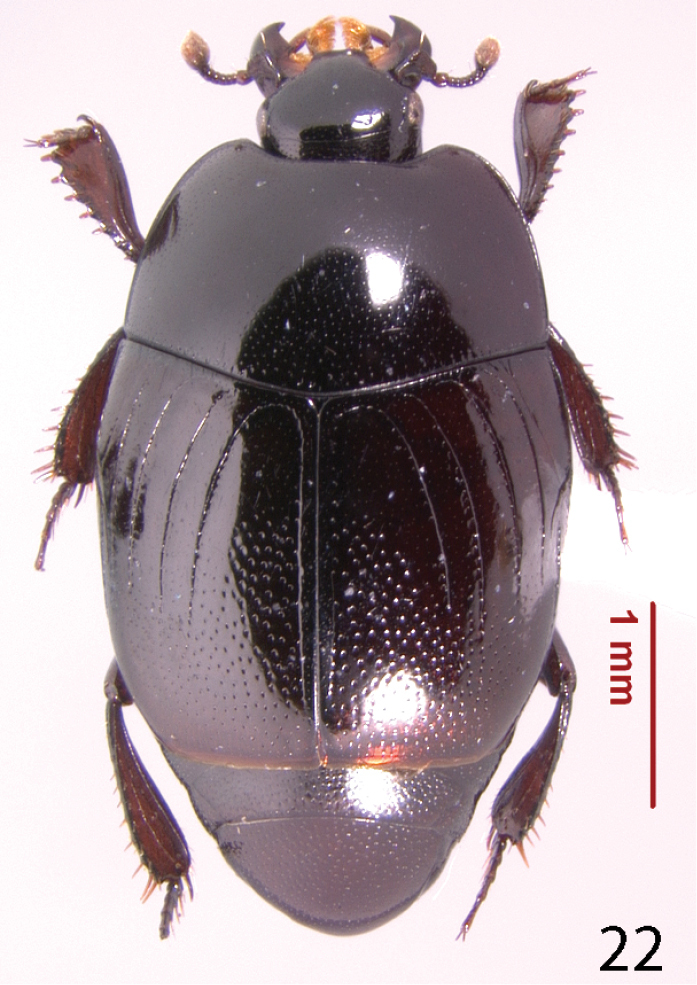

Scientific classification
- Kingdom: Animalia
- Phylum: Arthropoda
- Clade: Pancrustacea
- Class: Insecta
- Order: Coleoptera
- Suborder: Polyphaga
- Infraorder: Staphyliniformia
- Family: Histeridae
- Genus: Geomysaprinus
- Species: G. formicus

Binomial name
- Geomysaprinus formicus (Hinton, 1935)

= Geomysaprinus formicus =

Species of beetle

Geomysaprinus formicus is a species of clown beetle in the family Histeridae. It is found in Central America and North America.
