= Saprinus impressus =

Scientific classification
- Kingdom: Animalia
- Phylum: Arthropoda
- Clade: Pancrustacea
- Class: Insecta
- Order: Coleoptera
- Suborder: Polyphaga
- Infraorder: Staphyliniformia
- Family: Histeridae
- Genus: Saprinus
- Species: S. impressus

Binomial name
- Saprinus impressus J. E. LeConte, 1844

Species of beetle

Saprinus impressus is a species of clown beetle in the family Histeridae. It is found in North America.
