= Hypocaccus iris =

Scientific classification
- Kingdom: Animalia
- Phylum: Arthropoda
- Class: Insecta
- Order: Coleoptera
- Suborder: Polyphaga
- Infraorder: Staphyliniformia
- Family: Histeridae
- Genus: Hypocaccus
- Species: H. iris

Binomial name
- Hypocaccus iris (Fall, 1919)

Species of beetle

Hypocaccus iris is a species of clown beetle in the family Histeridae. It is found in North America.
