= Geomysaprinus goffi =

Scientific classification
- Kingdom: Animalia
- Phylum: Arthropoda
- Class: Insecta
- Order: Coleoptera
- Suborder: Polyphaga
- Infraorder: Staphyliniformia
- Family: Histeridae
- Genus: Geomysaprinus
- Species: G. goffi

Binomial name
- Geomysaprinus goffi Ross, 1940

Species of beetle

Geomysaprinus goffi is a species of clown beetle in the family Histeridae. It is found in North America.
