= Aphelosternus =

Scientific classification
- Kingdom: Animalia
- Phylum: Arthropoda
- Class: Insecta
- Order: Coleoptera
- Suborder: Polyphaga
- Infraorder: Staphyliniformia
- Family: Histeridae
- Subfamily: Saprininae
- Genus: Aphelosternus; Wenzel in Arnett, 1962

Genus of beetles

Aphelosternus is a genus of clown beetles in the family Histeridae. There is at least one described species in Aphelosternus, A. interstitialis.
