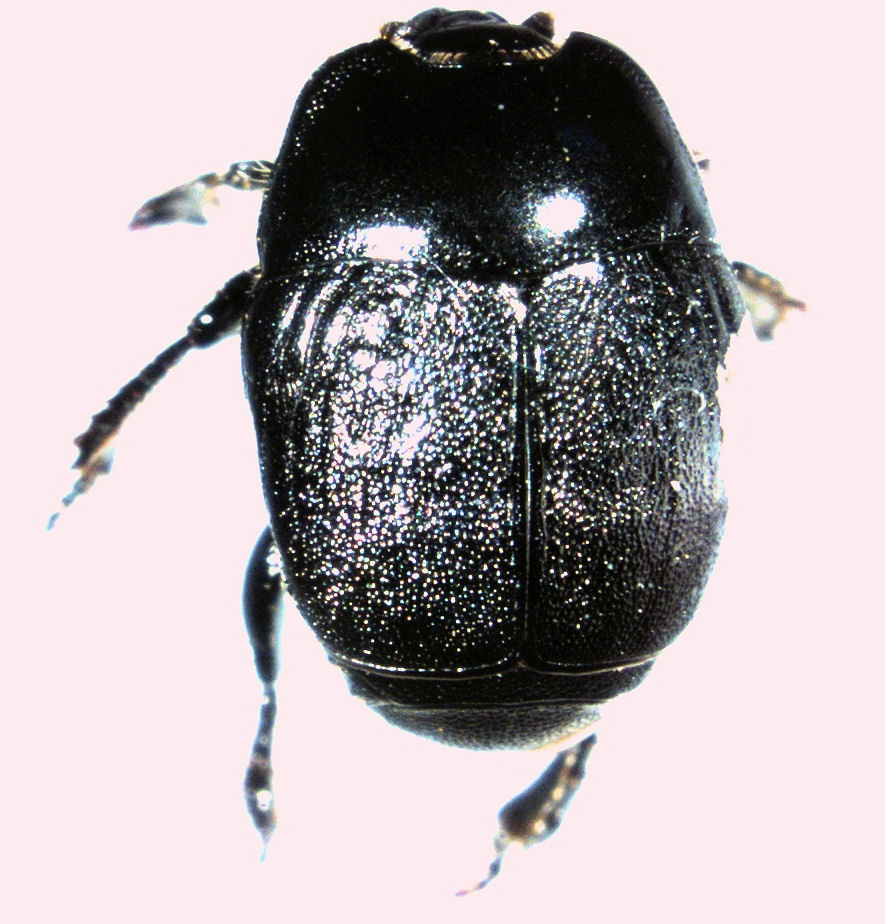
- Neopachylopus lepidulus

Scientific classification
- Kingdom: Animalia
- Phylum: Arthropoda
- Class: Insecta
- Order: Coleoptera
- Suborder: Polyphaga
- Infraorder: Staphyliniformia
- Family: Histeridae
- Subfamily: Saprininae
- Genus: Neopachylopus; Reichardt, 1926

= Neopachylopus =

Genus of beetles

Neopachylopus is a genus of clown beetles in the family Histeridae. There are six described species in Neopachylopus.

== Species ==
These six species belong to the genus Neopachylopus:

- Neopachylopus aeneipunctatus (Horn, 1871)
- Neopachylopus kochi Thérond, 1963
- Neopachylopus lepidulus (Broun, 1881)
- Neopachylopus pakistanicus Lackner, 2002
- Neopachylopus secqi Kanaar, 1998
- Neopachylopus sulcifrons (Mannerheim, 1843)
