= Gnathoncus barbatus =

Scientific classification
- Kingdom: Animalia
- Phylum: Arthropoda
- Class: Insecta
- Order: Coleoptera
- Suborder: Polyphaga
- Infraorder: Staphyliniformia
- Family: Histeridae
- Genus: Gnathoncus
- Species: G. barbatus

Binomial name
- Gnathoncus barbatus Bousquet & Laplante, 1999

Species of beetle

Gnathoncus barbatus is a species of clown beetle in the family Histeridae. It is found in North America.
