= Xerosaprinus =

Scientific classification
- Kingdom: Animalia
- Phylum: Arthropoda
- Class: Insecta
- Order: Coleoptera
- Suborder: Polyphaga
- Infraorder: Staphyliniformia
- Family: Histeridae
- Subfamily: Saprininae
- Genus: Xerosaprinus; Wenzel in Arnett, 1962

Genus of beetles

Xerosaprinus is a genus of clown beetles in the family Histeridae. There are more than 20 described species in Xerosaprinus.

== Species ==
These 29 species belong to the genus Xerosaprinus:

- Xerosaprinus acilinea (Marseul, 1862)
- Xerosaprinus bispeculatus (Casey, 1916)
- Xerosaprinus chiliensis (Marseul, 1855)
- Xerosaprinus ciliatoides (Fall, 1917)
- Xerosaprinus ciliatus (J. L. LeConte, 1851)
- Xerosaprinus coerulescens (J. L. LeConte, 1851)
- Xerosaprinus desertoides (McGrath & Hatch, 1941)
- Xerosaprinus diptychus (Marseul, 1855)
- Xerosaprinus effusus (Casey, 1916)
- Xerosaprinus fimbriatus (J. L. LeConte, 1851)
- Xerosaprinus fulgidus (J.E.LeConte, 1859)
- Xerosaprinus hidalgo Mazur, 1990
- Xerosaprinus ignotus (Marseul, 1855)
- Xerosaprinus intritus (Casey, 1893)
- Xerosaprinus laciniatus (Casey, 1916)
- Xerosaprinus lubricus (J. L. LeConte, 1851)
- Xerosaprinus martini (Fall, 1917)
- Xerosaprinus neglectus (Marseul, 1855)
- Xerosaprinus orbicularis
- Xerosaprinus orbiculatus (Marseul, 1855)
- Xerosaprinus plenus (J.L.LeConte, 1851)
- Xerosaprinus psyche (Casey, 1916)
- Xerosaprinus scabriceps (Casey, 1916)
- Xerosaprinus testudo (Casey, 1916)
- Xerosaprinus vafer (Marseul, 1855)
- Xerosaprinus vestitus (J. L. LeConte, 1851)
- Xerosaprinus viator (Marseul, 1855)
- Xerosaprinus vitiosus (J. L. LeConte, 1851)
- Xerosaprinus wenzeli Bousquet & Laplante, 2006
