= Xerosaprinus vitiosus =

Scientific classification
- Kingdom: Animalia
- Phylum: Arthropoda
- Class: Insecta
- Order: Coleoptera
- Suborder: Polyphaga
- Infraorder: Staphyliniformia
- Family: Histeridae
- Genus: Xerosaprinus
- Species: X. vitiosus

Binomial name
- Xerosaprinus vitiosus (J. L. LeConte, 1851)

Species of insect

Xerosaprinus vitiosus is a species of clown beetle in the family Histeridae. It is found in Central America and North America.
