= Saprinus lugens =

Scientific classification
- Kingdom: Animalia
- Phylum: Arthropoda
- Class: Insecta
- Order: Coleoptera
- Suborder: Polyphaga
- Infraorder: Staphyliniformia
- Family: Histeridae
- Genus: Saprinus
- Species: S. lugens

Binomial name
- Saprinus lugens Erichson, 1834

Species of beetle

Saprinus lugens is a species of clown beetle in the family Histeridae. It is found in Europe and Northern Asia (excluding China), Central America, and North America.
