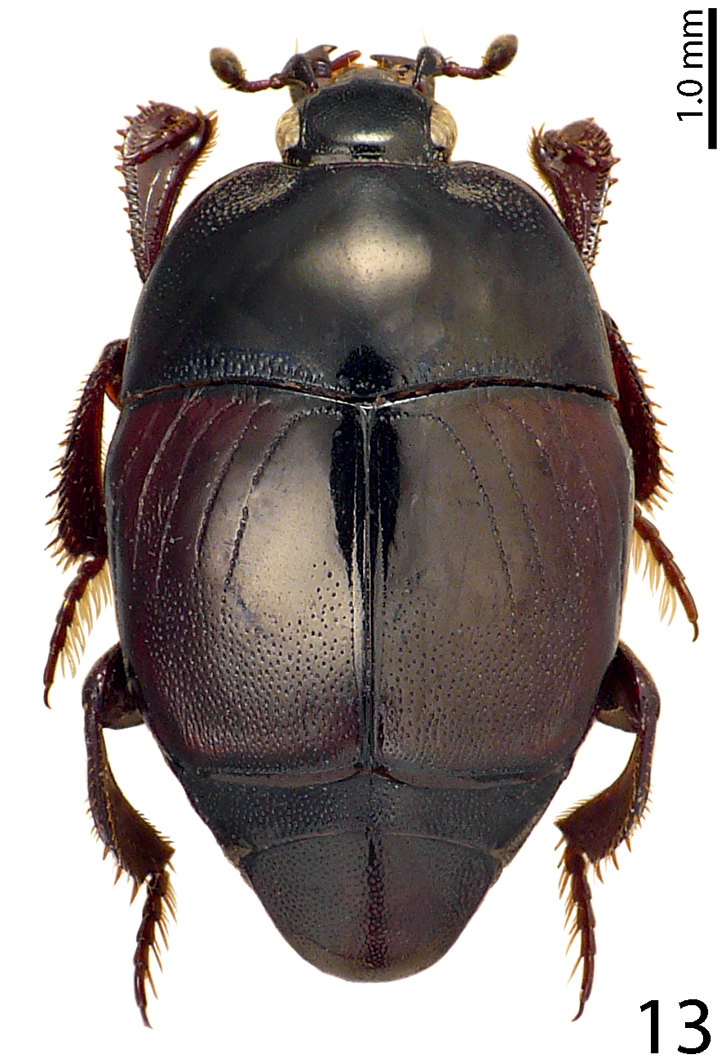

Scientific classification
- Kingdom: Animalia
- Phylum: Arthropoda
- Class: Insecta
- Order: Coleoptera
- Suborder: Polyphaga
- Infraorder: Staphyliniformia
- Family: Histeridae
- Genus: Saprinus
- Species: S. subnitescens

Binomial name
- Saprinus subnitescens Bickhardt, 1909

= Saprinus subnitescens =

Species of beetle

Saprinus subnitescens is a species of clown beetle in the family Histeridae. It is found in Africa, Europe and Northern Asia (excluding China), and North America.
