= Geomysaprinus =

Scientific classification
- Kingdom: Animalia
- Phylum: Arthropoda
- Class: Insecta
- Order: Coleoptera
- Suborder: Polyphaga
- Infraorder: Staphyliniformia
- Family: Histeridae
- Subfamily: Saprininae
- Genus: Geomysaprinus

Genus of beetles

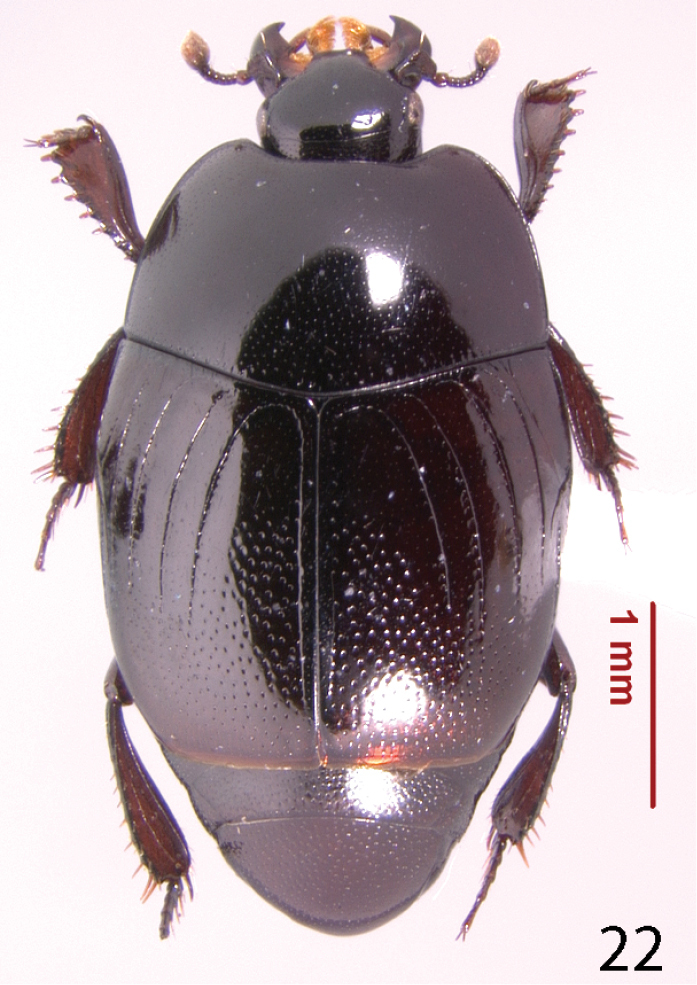
Geomysaprinus (Priscosaprinus) formicus

Geomysaprinus is a genus of clown beetles in the family Histeridae. There are at least 20 described species in Geomysaprinus.

== Species ==
- Geomysaprinus audax (Casey, 1893)
- Geomysaprinus belioculus (Marseul, 1862)
- Geomysaprinus bicirculus (Marseul, 1870)
- Geomysaprinus castanipennis (Fall, 1919)
- Geomysaprinus cheyennensis (Casey, 1916)
- Geomysaprinus copei (Horn, 1873)
- Geomysaprinus floridae (Horn, 1873)
- Geomysaprinus formicus (Hinton, 1935)
- Geomysaprinus goffi Ross, 1940
- Geomysaprinus lanei (McGrath and Hatch, 1941)
- Geomysaprinus laramiensis (Casey, 1893)
- Geomysaprinus moniliatus (Casey, 1916)
- Geomysaprinus oblongus (Wenzel, 1944)
- Geomysaprinus obscurus (J. L. LeConte, 1851)
- Geomysaprinus obsidianus (Casey, 1893)
- Geomysaprinus obsoletus (Casey, 1916)
- Geomysaprinus paeminosus (J. L. LeConte, 1851)
- Geomysaprinus parumpunctatus (J. L. LeConte, 1859)
- Geomysaprinus pectoralis (J. L. LeConte, 1851)
- Geomysaprinus pinorum (Casey, 1924)
- Geomysaprinus posthumus (Marseul, 1855)
- Geomysaprinus quaesitus (Lewis, 1888)
- Geomysaprinus rugosifrons (Fall, 1919)
- Geomysaprinus saulnieri Kovarik and Verity in Kovarik, Verity and Mitchell, 1999
- Geomysaprinus subtropicus (Casey, 1924)
- Geomysaprinus suffusus (Casey, 1916)
- Geomysaprinus tibialis Ross, 1940
- Geomysaprinus triangulifer (Marseul, 1855)
