= Xerosaprinus ciliatus =

Scientific classification
- Kingdom: Animalia
- Phylum: Arthropoda
- Clade: Pancrustacea
- Class: Insecta
- Order: Coleoptera
- Suborder: Polyphaga
- Infraorder: Staphyliniformia
- Family: Histeridae
- Genus: Xerosaprinus
- Species: X. ciliatus

Binomial name
- Xerosaprinus ciliatus (J. L. LeConte, 1851)

Species of beetle

Xerosaprinus ciliatus is a species of clown beetle in the family Histeridae. X. ciliatus is found in Central America and North America.
