= Saprinus discoidalis =

Scientific classification
- Kingdom: Animalia
- Phylum: Arthropoda
- Clade: Pancrustacea
- Class: Insecta
- Order: Coleoptera
- Suborder: Polyphaga
- Infraorder: Staphyliniformia
- Family: Histeridae
- Genus: Saprinus
- Species: S. discoidalis

Binomial name
- Saprinus discoidalis J. L. LeConte, 1851

Species of beetle

Saprinus discoidalis is a species of clown beetle in the family Histeridae. It is found in North America.

== Subspecies ==
These two subspecies belong to the species Saprinus discoidalis:

- Saprinus discoidalis amplus Casey
- Saprinus discoidalis discoidalis
