= Euspilotus conformis =

Scientific classification
- Kingdom: Animalia
- Phylum: Arthropoda
- Clade: Pancrustacea
- Class: Insecta
- Order: Coleoptera
- Suborder: Polyphaga
- Infraorder: Staphyliniformia
- Family: Histeridae
- Genus: Euspilotus
- Species: E. conformis

Binomial name
- Euspilotus conformis (J. E. LeConte, 1845)

Species of beetle

Euspilotus conformis is a species of clown beetle in the family Histeridae.

== Distribution ==
It is found in North America, with sightings mostly occurring in New Jersey and Florida, although it has been seen as far west as just east of the Rocky Mountains.
