= Victor Auzat =

French entomologist (1865–1939)

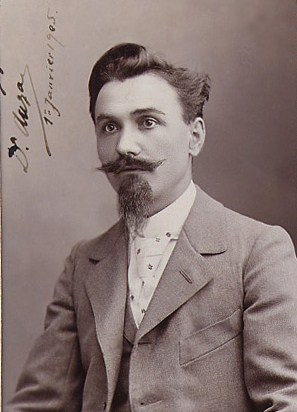
c. 1905

Jean François Victor Auzat (January 3, 1865 – September 27, 1939) was a French physician and amateur entomologist who specialized in beetles of the family Histeridae. A monograph work on the Gallo-Rhenish Histeridae that he began was unfinished and never published.

Auzat was born in Saint-Germain-de-Lembron (Puy-de-Dôme). He went to school at Clermont-Ferrand and became a school teacher in 1883. In 1886 he received a degree in natural science and a doctorate in 1890. He taught at the Orléans High School (1891), the Janson-de-Sailly High School (1892), and the Saint-Louis High School (1894). In 1894 he joined the faculty of medicine in Paris and became a doctor of medicine in 1903. He worked as an assistant professor at the Collège Rollin (Paris). In 1919 he became an officer of public instruction. He was a member of the Entomological Society of France from 1904 and in 1927 he received the Dollfus Prize of the Society. In 1908 he received the cross of agricultural merit.

Auzat published widely on the Histeridae and his collections went to the entomologist Therond and are now held in the museum of natural history in Paris.
