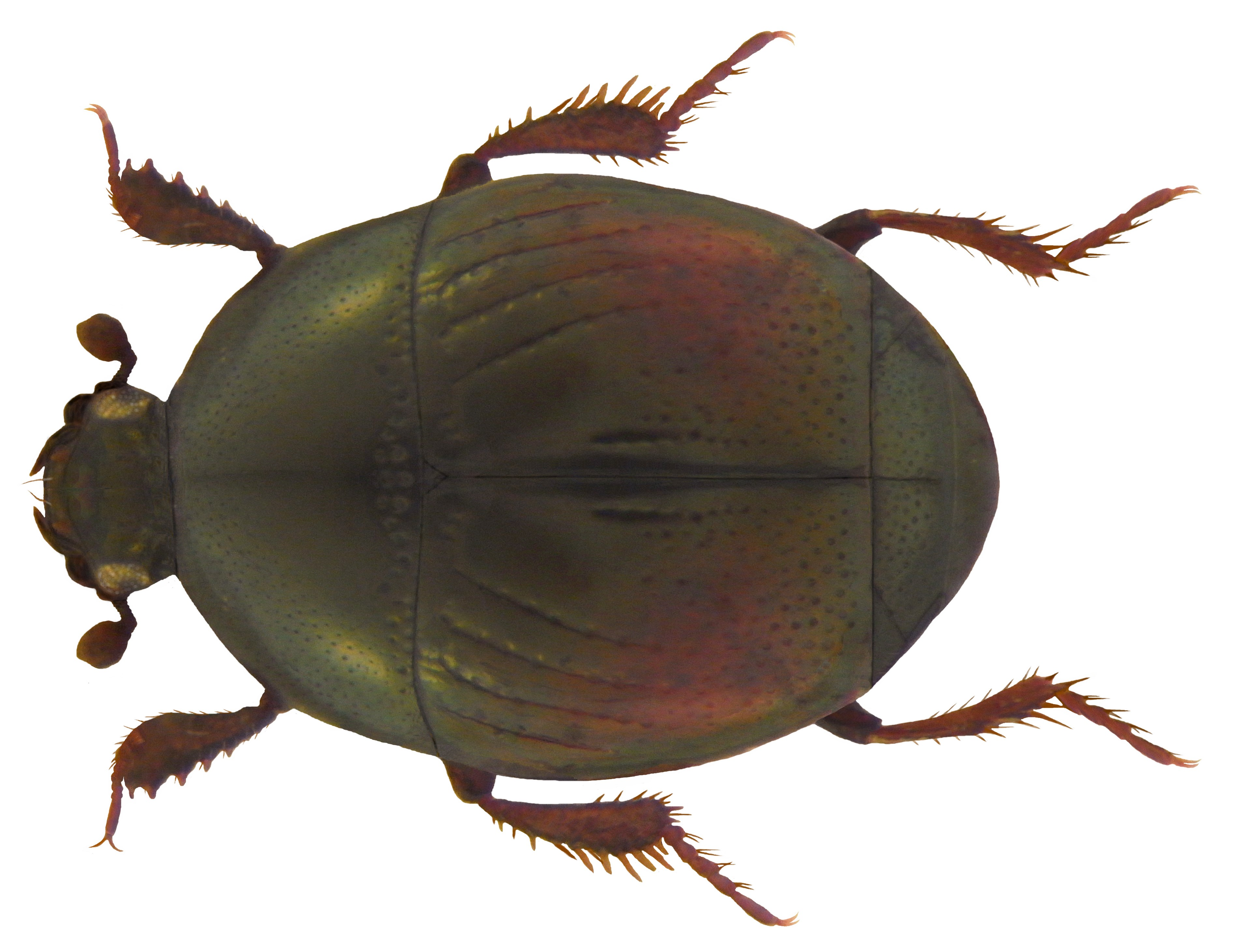
- Chalcionellus krikkeni

Scientific classification
- Kingdom: Animalia
- Phylum: Arthropoda
- Class: Insecta
- Order: Coleoptera
- Suborder: Polyphaga
- Infraorder: Staphyliniformia
- Family: Histeridae
- Subfamily: Saprininae; Blanchard, 1845

= Saprininae =

Subfamily of beetles

Saprininae is a subfamily of clown beetles in the family Histeridae. There are more than 50 genera and 800 described species in Saprininae.

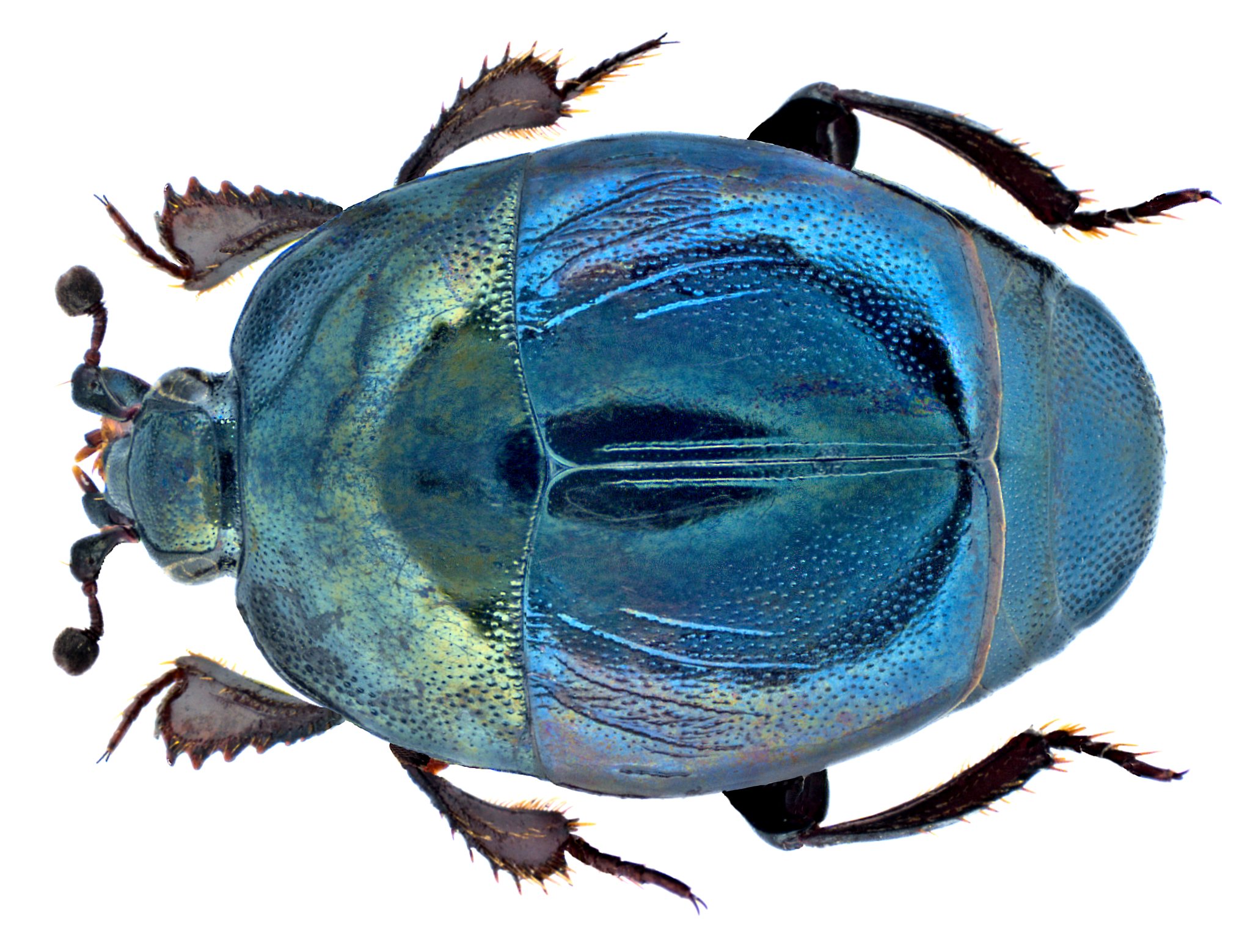
Saprinus splendens

== Genera ==
These 54 genera belong to the subfamily Saprininae:

- Afroprinus Lackner, 2013
- Afrosaprinus Vienna, 2015
- Alienocacculus Kanaar, 2008
- Ammostyphrus Reichardt, 1924
- Aphelosternus Wenzel in Arnett, 1962
- Axelinus Kryzhanovskij in Kryzhanovskij & Reichardt, 1976
- Chalcionellus Reichardt, 1932
- Chelyoxenus Hubbard, 1894
- Chivaenius Olexa, 1980
- Ctenophilothis Kryzhanovskij, 1987
- Dahlgrenius Penati & Vienna, 1996
- Eopachylopus Reichardt, 1926
- Erebidus Reichardt, 1941
- Eremosaprinus Ross, 1939
- Euspilotus Lewis, 1907
- Exaesiopus Reichardt, 1926
- Geomysaprinus Ross, 1940
- Gnathoncus Jacquelin-Duval, 1858
- Hemisaprinus Kryzhanovskij in Kryzhanovskij & Reichardt, 1976
- Hypocacculus Bickhardt, 1914
- Hypocaccus C. Thomson, 1867
- Malagasyprinus Lackner & Gomy, 2013
- Microsaprinus Kryzhanovskij in Kryzhanovskij & Reichardt, 1976
- Monachister Mazur, 1991
- Myrmetes Marseul, 1862
- Nannolepidius Reichardt, 1932
- Neopachylopus Reichardt, 1926
- Notosaprinus Kryzhanovskij, 1972
- Orateon Lackner & Ratto, 2014
- Pachylopus Erichson, 1834
- Parahypocaccus Vienna, 1995
- Paramyrmetes Bruch, 1929
- Paraphilothis Vienna, 1994
- Paravolvulus Reichardt, 1932
- Philothis Reichardt, 1930
- Philoxenus Mazur, 1991
- Pholioxenus Reichardt, 1932
- Phoxonotus Marseul, 1862
- Pilisaprinus Kanaar, 1996
- Reichardtia Wenzel, 1944
- Reichardtiolus Kryzhanovskij, 1959
- Saprinillus Kryzhanovskij, 1974
- Saprinodes Lewis, 1891
- Saprinus Erichson, 1834
- Sarandibrinus Lackner & Gomy, 2014
- Satrapister Bickhardt, 1912
- Styphrus Motschulsky, 1845
- Terametopon Vienna, 1987
- Tomogenius Marseul, 1862
- Turanostyphrus Tishechkin, 2005
- Xenonychus Wollaston, 1864
- Xenophilothis Kryzhanovskij, 1987
- Xerosaprinus Wenzel in Arnett, 1962
- Zorius Reichardt, 1932
