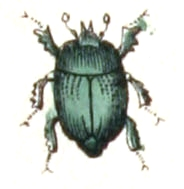
- Hypocaccus metallicus

Scientific classification
- Kingdom: Animalia
- Phylum: Arthropoda
- Class: Insecta
- Order: Coleoptera
- Suborder: Polyphaga
- Infraorder: Staphyliniformia
- Family: Histeridae
- Subfamily: Saprininae
- Genus: Hypocaccus; C. Thomson, 1867

= Hypocaccus =

Genus of beetles

Hypocaccus is a genus of clown beetles in the family Histeridae. There are more than 120 described species in Hypocaccus.

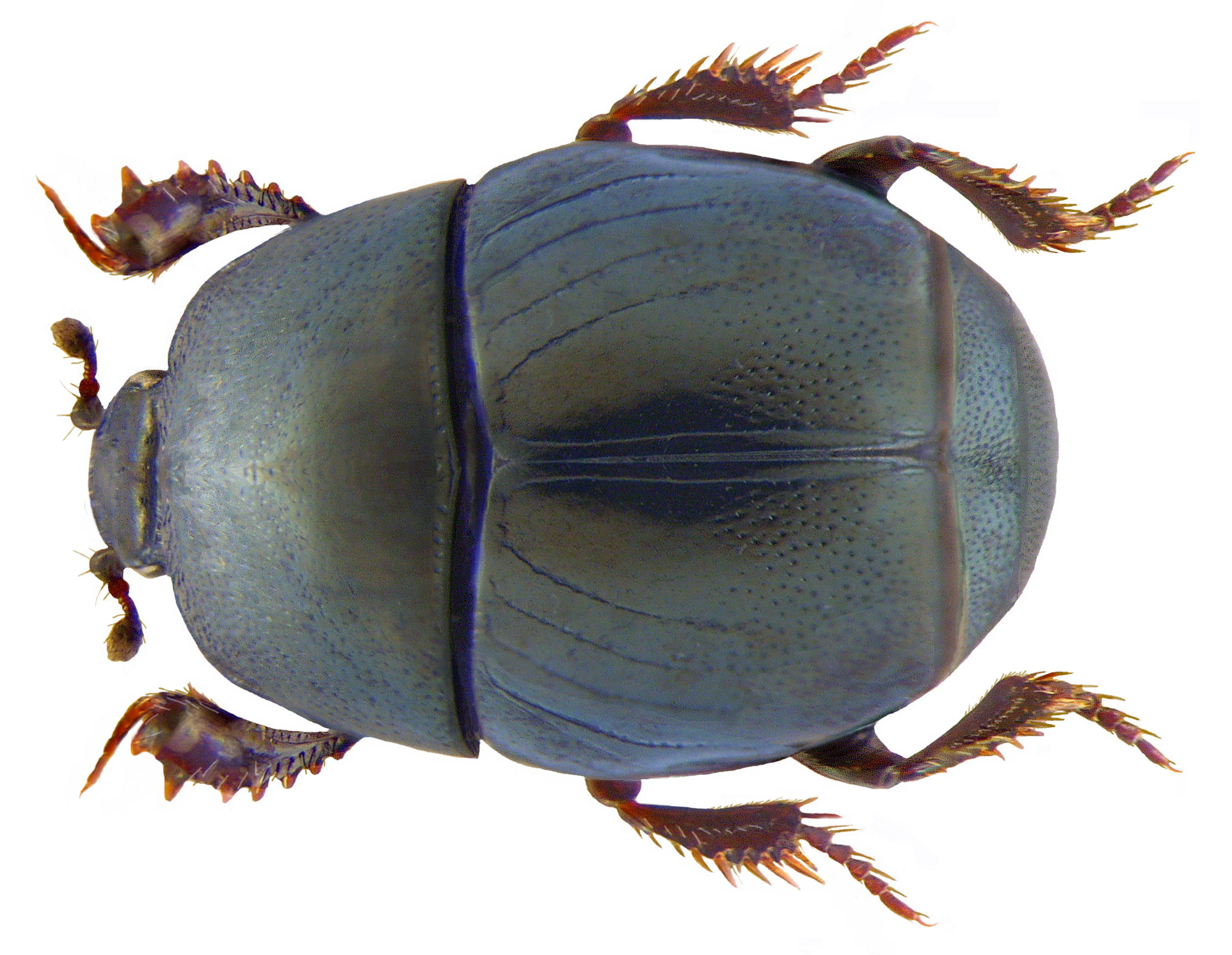
Hypocaccus rugifrons

== See also ==
- List of Hypocaccus species
