= List of Acritus species =

This is a list of 119 species in the genus Acritus.

== Acritus species ==
- Acritus abundans Cooman, 1932
- Acritus acaroides Marseul, 1856
- Acritus acinus Marseul, 1862
- Acritus alienus Thérond, 1960
- Acritus alluaudi Schmidt, 1895
- Acritus alticola Gomy, 1978
- Acritus alutaceus Thérond, 1961
- Acritus analis J. L. LeConte, 1853
- Acritus angoramensis Gomy, 1977
- Acritus arizonae Horn, 1873
- Acritus atai Gomy, 1984
- Acritus atomus J. L. LeConte, 1853
- Acritus attaphilus Wenzel, 1939
- Acritus australasiae Gomy, 1984
- Acritus bikoi Gomy, 2001
- Acritus bipartitus Lewis, 1888
- Acritus bisulcithorax Cooman, 1936
- Acritus blackburni Gomy, 1984
- Acritus blighi Gomy, 1984
- Acritus caldwelli Gomy, 1984
- Acritus caledoniae Wenzel, 1955
- Acritus caledonicus Gomy, 1981
- Acritus castaneus Lea, 1925
- Acritus cingulidens Marseul, 1879
- Acritus colettae Gomy, 1978
- Acritus cooteri Gomy, 1999
- Acritus copricola Cooman, 1932
- Acritus courtoisi Gomy, 1978
- Acritus deharvengi Gomy, 1981
- Acritus depressus Bousquet and Laplante, 2006
- Acritus discriminatus Thérond, 1973
- Acritus discus J. L. LeConte, 1853
- Acritus dogueti Gomy, 1984
- Acritus dugdalei Gomy, 1983
- Acritus egregius Cooman, 1932
- Acritus eichelbaumi Bickhardt, 1911
- Acritus elgonensis Jeannel and Paulian, 1945
- Acritus erimae Gomy, 1981
- Acritus exiguus (Erichson, 1834)
- Acritus exquisitus Cooman, 1932
- Acritus fidjensis Gomy, 1983
- Acritus fidjicus Gomy, 1983
- Acritus fimetarius (J. E. LeConte, 1844)
- Acritus fuligineus Lewis, 1888
- Acritus gibbipectus Cooman, 1932
- Acritus griffithi Gomy, 1984
- Acritus haedillus Marseul, 1870
- Acritus halmaturinus Lea, 1925
- Acritus hammondi Gomy, 1980
- Acritus helferi Reichardt, 1932
- Acritus helmsi Gomy, 1984
- Acritus herbertfranzi Gomy, 1981
- Acritus hilum Lewis, 1888
- Acritus homoeopathicus Wollaston, 1857
- Acritus hopffgarteni Reitter, 1878
- Acritus ignobilis (Lewis, 1888)
- Acritus indignus Schmidt, 1893
- Acritus inquilinus Lea, 1925
- Acritus insipiens Marseul, 1879
- Acritus italicus Reitter, 1904
- Acritus komai Lewis, 1879
- Acritus kuscheli Gomy, 1984
- Acritus lamberti Gomy, 1994
- Acritus leai Gomy, 1984
- Acritus liliputianus Lewis, 1888
- Acritus loriai Gomy, 1980
- Acritus madagascariensis Schmidt, 1895
- Acritus magnus Cooman, 1935
- Acritus mahnerti Gomy, 1981
- Acritus mandelai Gomy, 2001
- Acritus mateui Gomy, 1988
- Acritus matthewsi Gomy, 1984
- Acritus megaponerae Bickhardt in Brauns, 1914
- Acritus methneri Bickhardt, 1921
- Acritus mexicanus (Lewis, 1888)
- Acritus microsomus Cooman, 1932
- Acritus microtatus Cooman, 1934
- Acritus minutus (Herbst, 1791)
- Acritus muhlei Gomy, 2001
- Acritus mulleri Gomy, 2007
- Acritus multipunctus Bickhardt, 1911
- Acritus nepalensis Gomy, 1976
- Acritus nigricornis (Hoffmann, 1803)
- Acritus novaeguineae Gomy, 1977
- Acritus occidentalis Lea, 1925
- Acritus opimus Cooman, 1947
- Acritus pascuarum Cooman, 1947
- Acritus paulae Gomy, 1980
- Acritus pectinatus Cooman, 1932
- Acritus peculiaris Lewis, 1888
- Acritus pirata Gomy, 1978
- Acritus poggi Gomy, 1980
- Acritus prosternalis (Deane, 1932)
- Acritus punctisternus Wenzel and Dybas, 1941
- Acritus quadristriatus Lewis, 1888
- Acritus quilleroui Gomy, 1984
- Acritus rugosus Bickhardt, 1911
- Acritus schmidti Wenzel, 1955
- Acritus serratus Burgeon, 1939
- Acritus shirozui Hisamatsu, 1965
- Acritus strigipennis Bickhardt, 1912
- Acritus strigosus J. L. LeConte, 1853
- Acritus substriatus Marseul, 1856
- Acritus subtilissimus Schmidt, 1893
- Acritus sulcatellus Cooman, 1935
- Acritus tasmaniae Lewis, 1892
- Acritus tataricus Reitter, 1878
- Acritus tazekae Gomy, 1980
- Acritus teaboomae Gomy, 1976
- Acritus tenuis Marseul, 1856
- Acritus tropicus Lea, 1925
- Acritus tuberculatus Wenzel and Dybas, 1941
- Acritus tuberisternus Cooman, 1932
- Acritus udege Gomy and Tishechkin, 1993
- Acritus vacheri Cooman, 1932
- Acritus vaulogeri Cooman, 1935
- Acritus wenzeli Gomy, 1981
- Acritus werneri Gomy, 1981
- Acritus wokanensis Marseul, 1879
