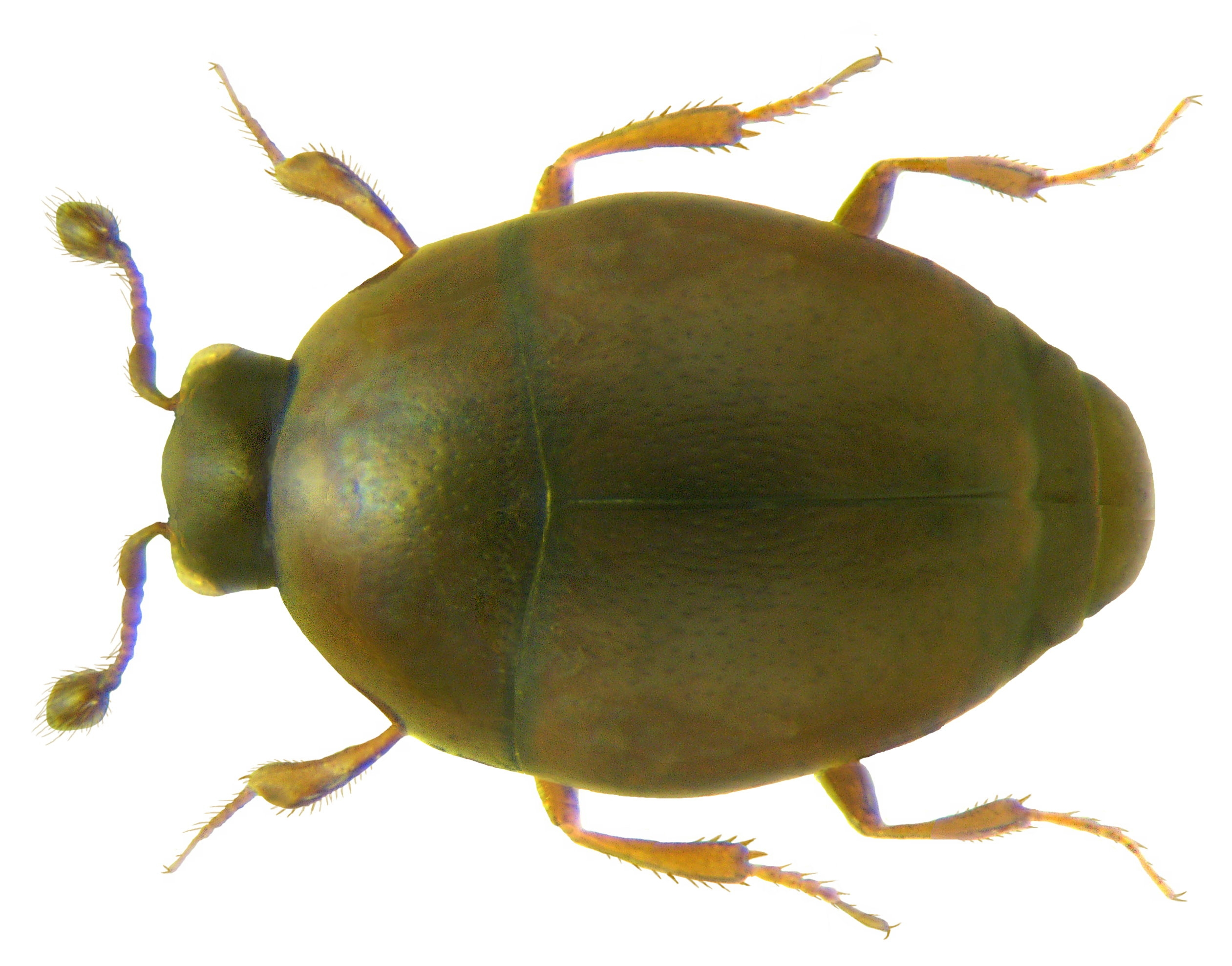
- Acritus nigricornis

Scientific classification
- Kingdom: Animalia
- Phylum: Arthropoda
- Class: Insecta
- Order: Coleoptera
- Suborder: Polyphaga
- Infraorder: Staphyliniformia
- Family: Histeridae
- Subfamily: Abraeinae; MacLeay, 1819

= Abraeinae =

Subfamily of beetles

Abraeinae is a subfamily of clown beetles in the family Histeridae. There are at least 20 genera and at least 440 described species in Abraeinae.

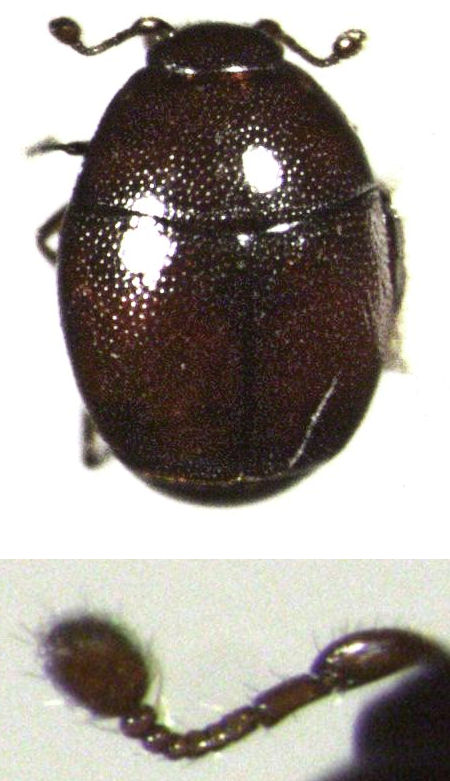
Acritus nigricornis

Many of the groups are tiny, with adults less than 2 mm in length. These beetles are diverse in form with a small oval specie that separates them from all the other histerids except for the Bacaniini. The Abraeinae lacks a separate basal piece of the aedeagus.

== Genera ==
- Abaeletes Cooman, 1940
- Abraeus Leach, 1817
- Acritodes Cooman, 1935
- Acritomorphus Wenzel, 1944
- Acritus J. L. LeConte, 1853
- Aeletes Horn, 1873
- Aeletodes Gomy, 1977
- Anophtaeletes Olexa, 1976
- Arizonacritus Gomy & Warner, 2013
- Chaetabraeus Portevin, 1929
- Eubrachium Wollaston, 1862
- Halacritus Schmidt, 1893
- Iberacritus Yélamos, 1994
- Mascarenium Gomy, 1978
- Phloeolister Bickhardt, 1916
- Plegaderus Erichson, 1834
- Pleuroleptus G. Müller, 1937
- Spelaeabraeus Moro, 1957
- Spelaeacritus Jeannel, 1934
- Teretriosoma Horn, 1873
- Teretrius Erichson, 1834
- Therondus Gomy, 1974
- Trypolister Bickhardt, 1916
- Xiphonotus Lacordaire, 1854
