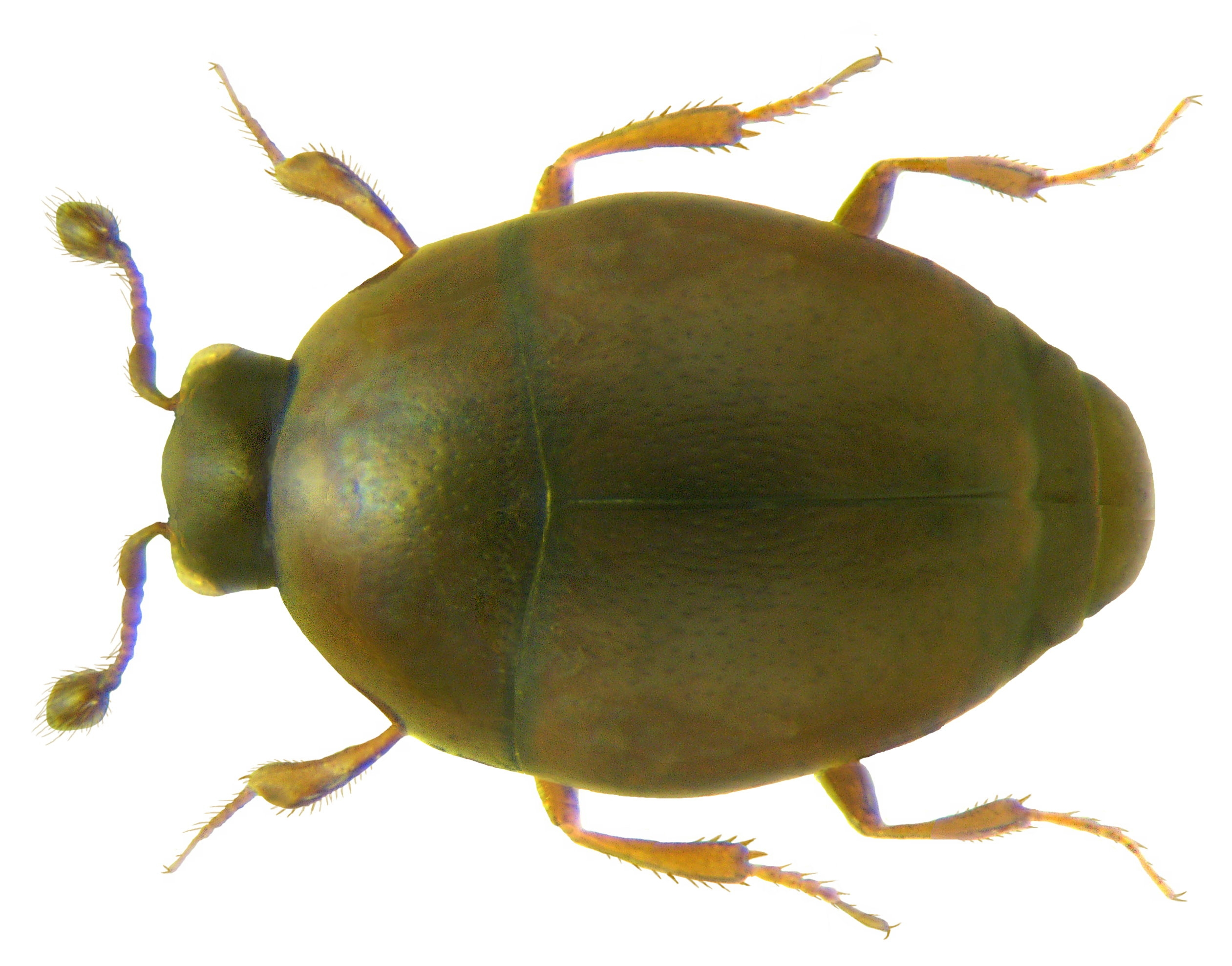
- Acritus nigricornis

Scientific classification
- Domain: Eukaryota
- Kingdom: Animalia
- Phylum: Arthropoda
- Class: Insecta
- Order: Coleoptera
- Suborder: Polyphaga
- Infraorder: Staphyliniformia
- Family: Histeridae
- Subfamily: Abraeinae
- Tribe: Acritini; Wenzel, 1944

= Acritini =

Tribe of beetles

Acritini is a tribe of clown beetles in the family Histeridae. There are about 12 genera and at least 250 described species in Acritini.

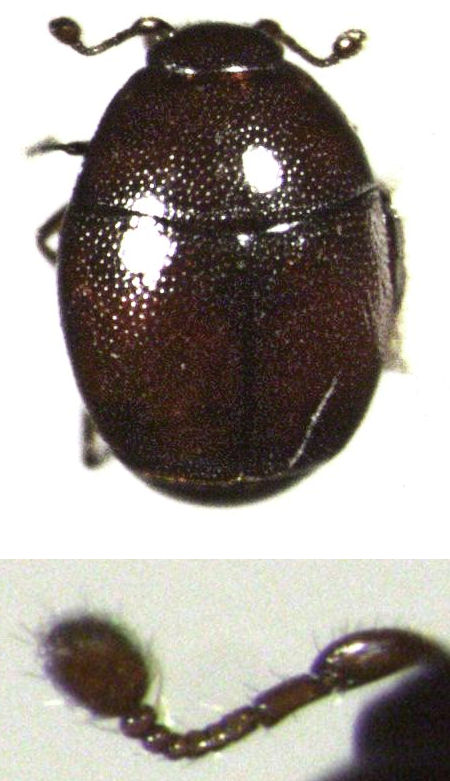
Acritus nigricornis

== Genera ==
- Abaeletes Cooman, 1940
- Acritodes Cooman, 1935
- Acritus J. L. LeConte, 1853
- Aeletes Horn, 1873
- Aeletodes Gomy, 1977
- Anophtaeletes Olexa, 1976
- Arizonacritus Gomy & Warner, 2013
- Halacritus Schmidt, 1893
- Iberacritus Yélamos, 1994
- Mascarenium Gomy, 1978
- Spelaeacritus Jeannel, 1934
- Therondus Gomy, 1974
