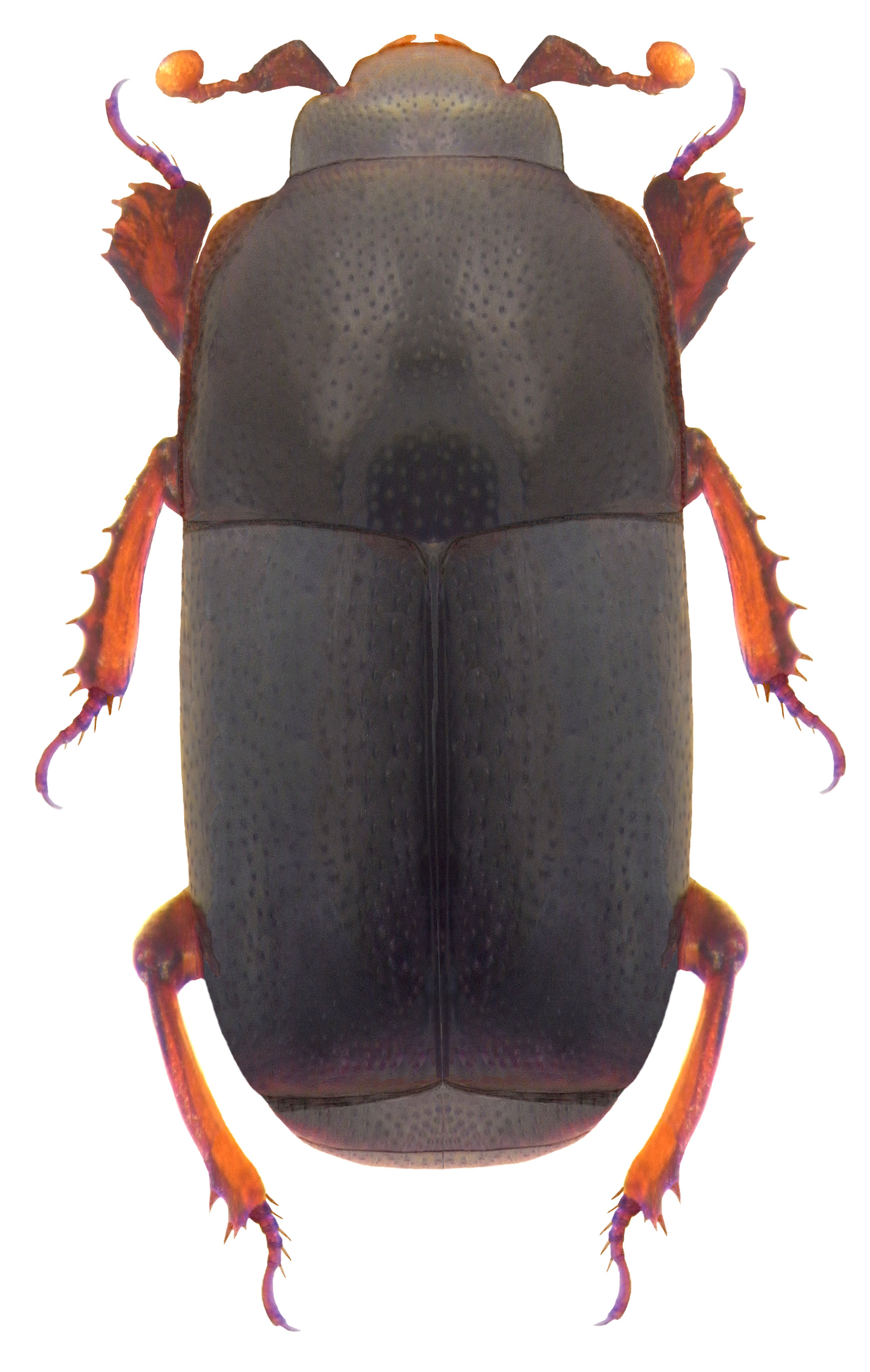
- Teretrius fabricii

Scientific classification
- Kingdom: Animalia
- Phylum: Arthropoda
- Class: Insecta
- Order: Coleoptera
- Suborder: Polyphaga
- Infraorder: Staphyliniformia
- Family: Histeridae
- Subfamily: Abraeinae
- Tribe: Teretriini; Bickhardt, 1914

= Teretriini =

Tribe of beetles

Teretriini is a tribe of clown beetles in the family Histeridae. There are about 5 genera and more than 90 described species in Teretriini.

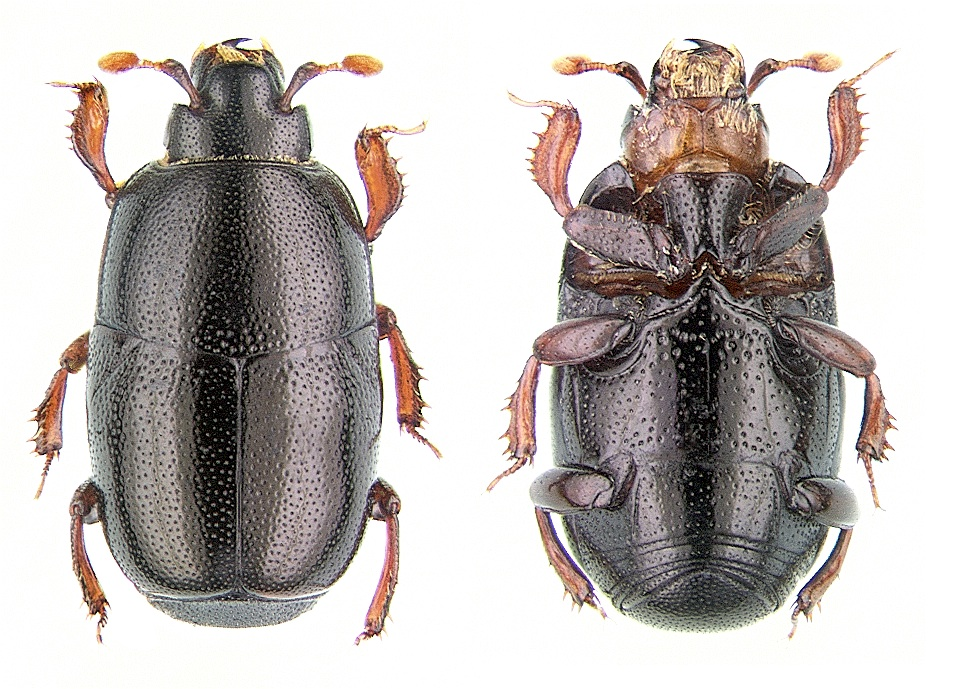
Teretrius nigrescens

== Genera ==
These five genera belong to the tribe Teretriini:

- Pleuroleptus G. Müller, 1937
- Teretriosoma Horn, 1873
- Teretrius Erichson, 1834
- Trypolister Bickhardt, 1916
- Xiphonotus Lacordaire, 1854
