= Acritus komai =

Scientific classification
- Kingdom: Animalia
- Phylum: Arthropoda
- Clade: Pancrustacea
- Class: Insecta
- Order: Coleoptera
- Suborder: Polyphaga
- Infraorder: Staphyliniformia
- Family: Histeridae
- Genus: Acritus
- Species: A. komai

Binomial name
- Acritus komai Lewis, 1879

Species of beetle

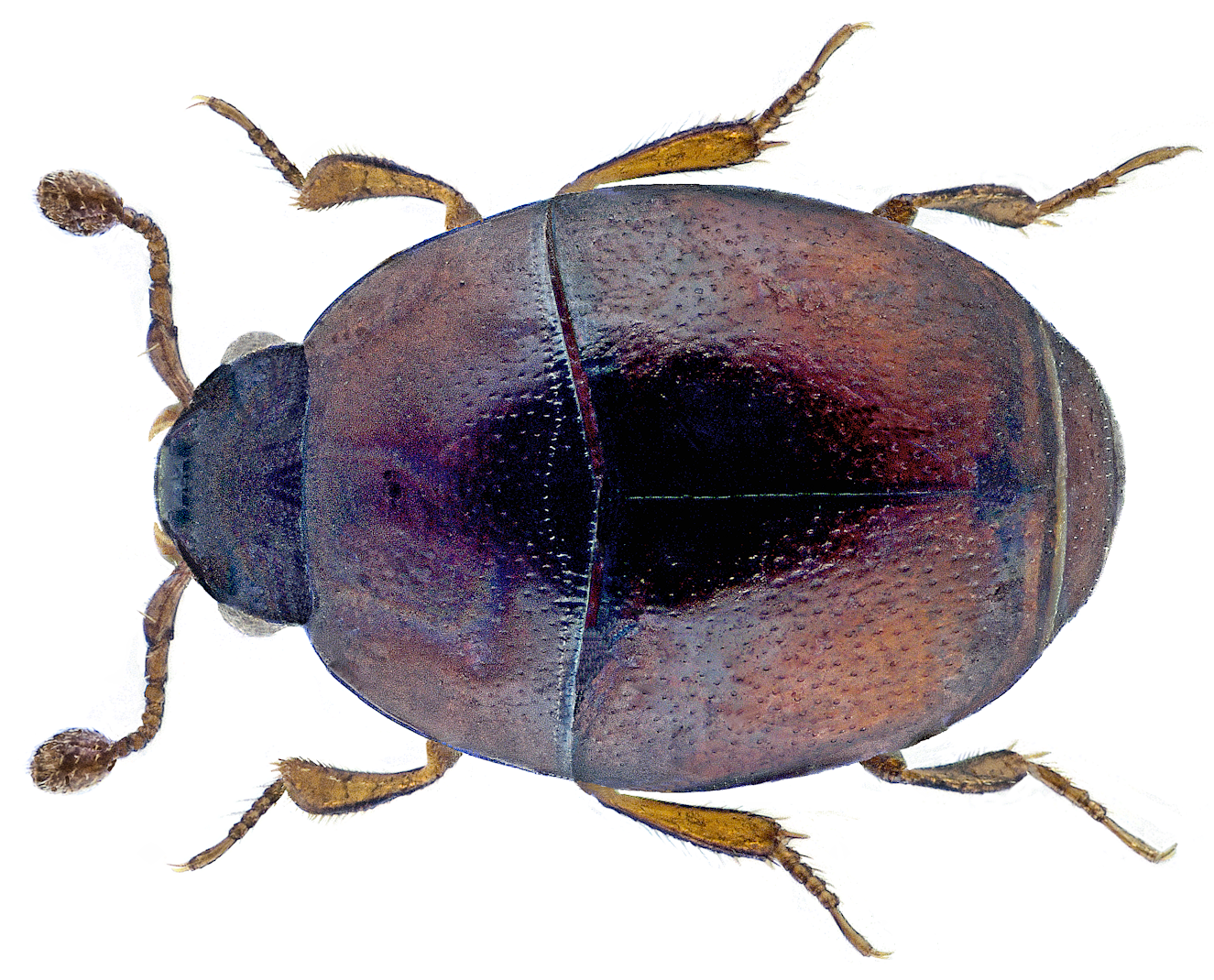

Acritus komai is a species of clown beetles in the family Histeridae. It is found in Africa, Australia, Europe and Northern Asia (excluding China), North America, Oceania, and Southern Asia.
