= Teretrius orbus =

Scientific classification
- Kingdom: Animalia
- Phylum: Arthropoda
- Class: Insecta
- Order: Coleoptera
- Suborder: Polyphaga
- Infraorder: Staphyliniformia
- Family: Histeridae
- Genus: Teretrius
- Species: T. orbus

Binomial name
- Teretrius orbus Lewis, 1888

Species of beetle

Teretrius orbus is a species of clown beetle in the family Histeridae. It is found in Central America and North America.
