= Teretriosoma conigerum =

Scientific classification
- Kingdom: Animalia
- Phylum: Arthropoda
- Class: Insecta
- Order: Coleoptera
- Suborder: Polyphaga
- Infraorder: Staphyliniformia
- Family: Histeridae
- Genus: Teretriosoma
- Species: T. conigerum

Binomial name
- Teretriosoma conigerum Lewis, 1888

Species of beetle

Teretriosoma conigerum is a species of clown beetle in the family Histeridae. It is found in Central America and North America.
