= Teretriosoma chalybaeum =

Scientific classification
- Kingdom: Animalia
- Phylum: Arthropoda
- Class: Insecta
- Order: Coleoptera
- Suborder: Polyphaga
- Infraorder: Staphyliniformia
- Family: Histeridae
- Genus: Teretriosoma
- Species: T. chalybaeum

Binomial name
- Teretriosoma chalybaeum Horn, 1873

Species of beetle

Teretriosoma chalybaeum is a species of clown beetle in the family Histeridae. It is found in Central America and North America.
