= Aeletes floridae =

Scientific classification
- Kingdom: Animalia
- Phylum: Arthropoda
- Class: Insecta
- Order: Coleoptera
- Suborder: Polyphaga
- Infraorder: Staphyliniformia
- Family: Histeridae
- Genus: Aeletes
- Species: A. floridae

Binomial name
- Aeletes floridae (Marseul, 1862)

Species of beetle

Aeletes floridae is a species of clown beetle in the family Histeridae. It is found in the Caribbean Sea and North America.
