= Acritus tuberisternus =

Scientific classification
- Kingdom: Animalia
- Phylum: Arthropoda
- Class: Insecta
- Order: Coleoptera
- Suborder: Polyphaga
- Infraorder: Staphyliniformia
- Family: Histeridae
- Genus: Acritus
- Species: A. tuberisternus

Binomial name
- Acritus tuberisternus Cooman, 1932

Species of beetle

Acritus tuberisternus, is a species of clown beetle found in Indo-Pacific regional countries such as Japan, Mauritius, Sri Lanka, India, Myanmar, Vietnam, Laos, Malaysia, Taiwan.
