= Teretrius latebricola =

Scientific classification
- Kingdom: Animalia
- Phylum: Arthropoda
- Class: Insecta
- Order: Coleoptera
- Suborder: Polyphaga
- Infraorder: Staphyliniformia
- Family: Histeridae
- Genus: Teretrius
- Species: T. latebricola

Binomial name
- Teretrius latebricola Lewis, 1901

Species of beetle

Teretrius latebricola is a species of clown beetle in the family Histeridae. It is found in North America.
