= Acritus attaphilus =

Scientific classification
- Kingdom: Animalia
- Phylum: Arthropoda
- Class: Insecta
- Order: Coleoptera
- Suborder: Polyphaga
- Infraorder: Staphyliniformia
- Family: Histeridae
- Genus: Acritus
- Species: A. attaphilus

Binomial name
- Acritus attaphilus Wenzel, 1939

Species of beetle

Acritus attaphilus is a species of clown beetle in the family Histeridae. It is found in North America.
