= Acritus acaroides =

Scientific classification
- Kingdom: Animalia
- Phylum: Arthropoda
- Class: Insecta
- Order: Coleoptera
- Suborder: Polyphaga
- Infraorder: Staphyliniformia
- Family: Histeridae
- Genus: Acritus
- Species: A. acaroides

Binomial name
- Acritus acaroides Marseul, 1856

Species of beetle

Acritus acaroides is a species of clown beetle in the family Histeridae and tribe Acritini. It ranges in size from 0.9-1.1mm, very rarely reaching 2mm. It is found in North America, roughly from eastern Texas to South Carolina.
