= Abraeus loebli =

Scientific classification
- Kingdom: Animalia
- Phylum: Arthropoda
- Clade: Pancrustacea
- Class: Insecta
- Order: Coleoptera
- Suborder: Polyphaga
- Infraorder: Staphyliniformia
- Family: Histeridae
- Genus: Abraeus
- Species: A. loebli

Binomial name
- Abraeus loebli Gomy and M.Ohara, 2001

Species of beetle

Abraeus loebli is a beetle discovered by Yves Gomy and Masahiro Ôhara in 2001. No sub-species listed in Catalogue of Life.
