= Teretrius cylindrellus =

Scientific classification
- Kingdom: Animalia
- Phylum: Arthropoda
- Class: Insecta
- Order: Coleoptera
- Suborder: Polyphaga
- Infraorder: Staphyliniformia
- Family: Histeridae
- Genus: Teretrius
- Species: T. cylindrellus

Binomial name
- Teretrius cylindrellus Casey, 1916

Species of beetle

Teretrius cylindrellus is a species of clown beetle in the family Histeridae. It is found in North America.

Teretrius is the Genus of beetle.
