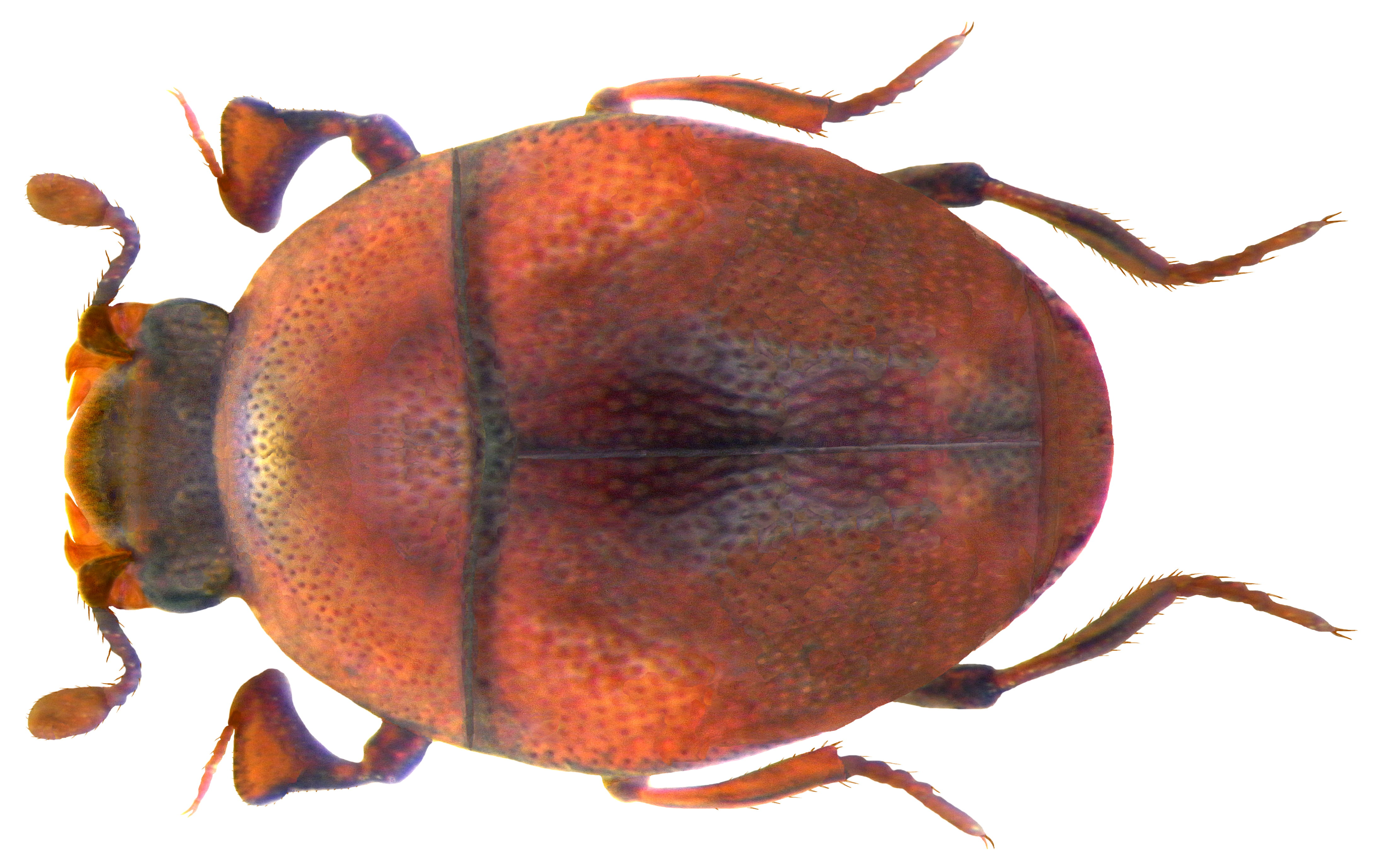
- Abraeus granulum

Scientific classification
- Domain: Eukaryota
- Kingdom: Animalia
- Phylum: Arthropoda
- Class: Insecta
- Order: Coleoptera
- Suborder: Polyphaga
- Infraorder: Staphyliniformia
- Family: Histeridae
- Subfamily: Abraeinae
- Tribe: Abraeini
- Genus: Abraeus; Leach, 1817

Species
- See text

= Abraeus =

Genus of beetles

Abraeus is a genus of hister beetles.

== Species ==
- Abraeus areolatus (Reitter, 1884)
- Abraeus bolteri LeConte, 1880
- Abraeus brevissimus Roubal, 1930
- Abraeus globosus (Hoffmann, 1803)
- Abraeus granulum Erichson, 1839
- Abraeus loebli Gomy and M.Ohara, 2001
- Abraeus parvulus Aubé, 1842
- Abraeus perpusillus (Marsham, 1802)
- Abraeus roubali Olexa, 1958
