= Chaetabraeus chandleri =

Scientific classification
- Kingdom: Animalia
- Phylum: Arthropoda
- Class: Insecta
- Order: Coleoptera
- Suborder: Polyphaga
- Infraorder: Staphyliniformia
- Family: Histeridae
- Genus: Chaetabraeus
- Species: C. chandleri

Binomial name
- Chaetabraeus chandleri Mazur, 1991

Species of beetle

Chaetabraeus chandleri is a species of clown beetle in the family Histeridae. It is found in North America.
