= Acritus discus =

Scientific classification
- Kingdom: Animalia
- Phylum: Arthropoda
- Clade: Pancrustacea
- Class: Insecta
- Order: Coleoptera
- Suborder: Polyphaga
- Infraorder: Staphyliniformia
- Family: Histeridae
- Genus: Acritus
- Species: A. discus

Binomial name
- Acritus discus J. L. LeConte, 1853

Species of beetle

Acritus discus is a species of clown beetle in the family Histeridae. It is found in North America.
