= Acritus arizonae =

Scientific classification
- Kingdom: Animalia
- Phylum: Arthropoda
- Clade: Pancrustacea
- Class: Insecta
- Order: Coleoptera
- Suborder: Polyphaga
- Infraorder: Staphyliniformia
- Family: Histeridae
- Genus: Acritus
- Species: A. arizonae

Binomial name
- Acritus arizonae Horn, 1873

Species of beetle

Acritus arizonae is a species of clown beetle in the family Histeridae. It is found in Arizona, the United States. It has been found from decaying saguaro cacti (Carnegiea gigantea).
