= Abraeus bolteri =

Scientific classification
- Kingdom: Animalia
- Phylum: Arthropoda
- Clade: Pancrustacea
- Class: Insecta
- Order: Coleoptera
- Suborder: Polyphaga
- Infraorder: Staphyliniformia
- Family: Histeridae
- Genus: Abraeus
- Species: A. bolteri

Binomial name
- Abraeus bolteri J. L. LeConte, 1880

Species of beetle

Abraeus bolteri is a species of clown beetle in the family Histeridae. It is found in North America.
