= Chaetabraeus paria =

Scientific classification
- Kingdom: Animalia
- Phylum: Arthropoda
- Clade: Pancrustacea
- Class: Insecta
- Order: Coleoptera
- Suborder: Polyphaga
- Infraorder: Staphyliniformia
- Family: Histeridae
- Genus: Chaetabraeus
- Species: C. paria

Binomial name
- Chaetabraeus paria (Marseul, 1856)

Species of beetle

Chaetabraeus (Mazureus) paria, is a species of clown beetle found in Pakistan, East India, Sri Lanka, Thailand, Taiwan and Sumatra.
