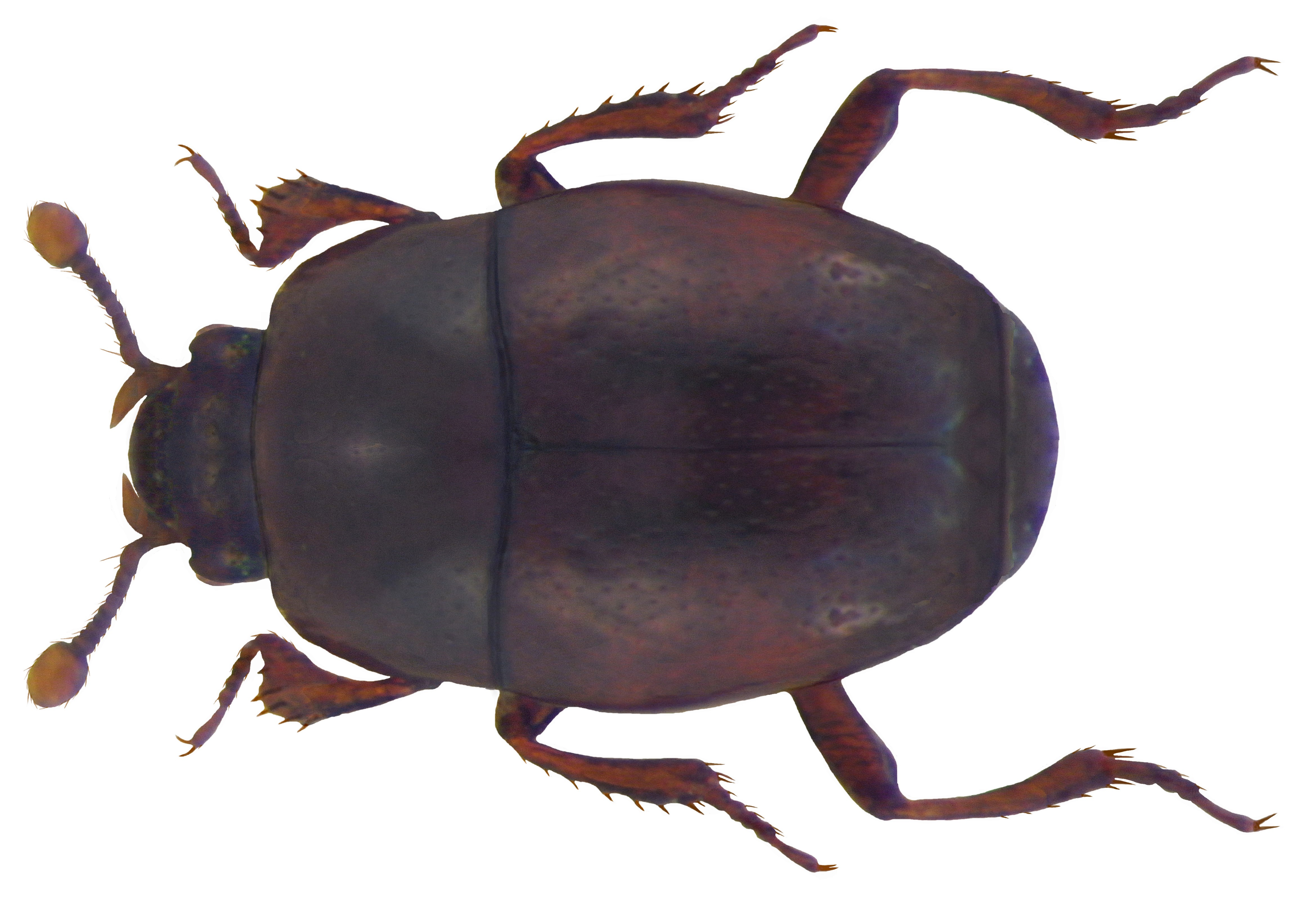
- Halacritus punctum

Scientific classification
- Kingdom: Animalia
- Phylum: Arthropoda
- Class: Insecta
- Order: Coleoptera
- Suborder: Polyphaga
- Infraorder: Staphyliniformia
- Family: Histeridae
- Tribe: Acritini
- Genus: Halacritus; Schmidt, 1893

= Halacritus =

Genus of beetles

Halacritus is a genus of clown beetles in the family Histeridae. There are more than 20 described species in Halacritus.

== Species ==
These 24 species belong to the genus Halacritus:

- Halacritus algarum (Schmidt, 1893)
- Halacritus alutiger Wenzel, 1944
- Halacritus atlanticus (Chobaut, 1923)
- Halacritus averyi Gomy, 1978
- Halacritus beneteaui Gomy, 1978
- Halacritus blackwelderi Wenzel, 1944
- Halacritus capensis Gomy, 1989
- Halacritus caracciolii Gomy, 1989
- Halacritus cauchei Gomy, 1978
- Halacritus condenti Gomy, 1989
- Halacritus courayei Gomy, 2004
- Halacritus glabrus Wenzel, 1944
- Halacritus instabilis (Marseul, 1869)
- Halacritus kidi Gomy, 1978
- Halacritus labusei Gomy, 1978
- Halacritus lividus (Lea, 1925)
- Halacritus maritimus (J. L. LeConte, 1851)
- Halacritus marthoti Gomy, 1976
- Halacritus missoni Gomy, 1978
- Halacritus parallelus (Casey, 1916)
- Halacritus punctum (Aubé, 1842)
- Halacritus regimondi Gomy, 1978
- Halacritus salinus (J. L. LeConte, 1878)
- Halacritus surcoufi Gomy, 1978
