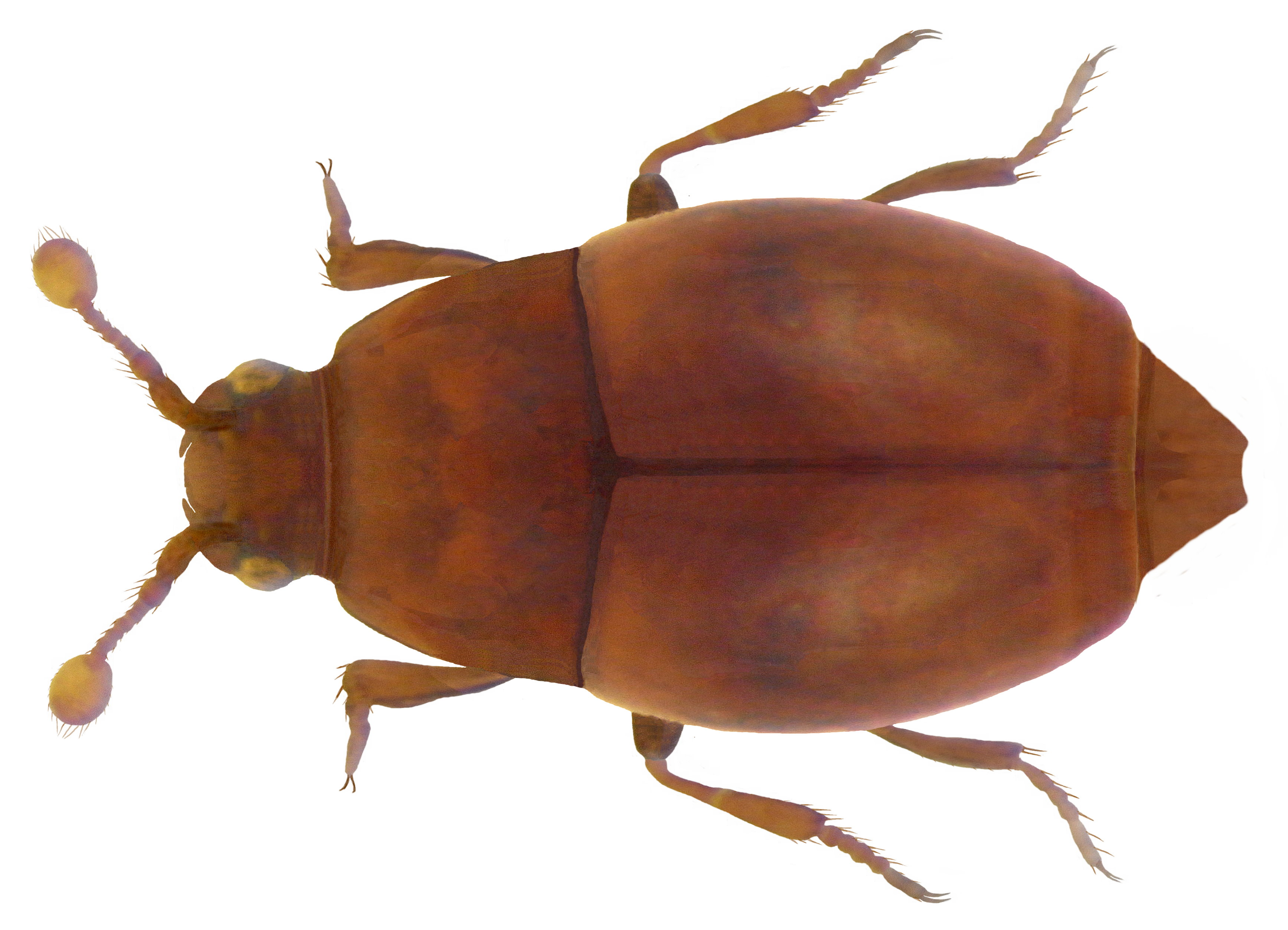
- Aeletes atomarius

Scientific classification
- Domain: Eukaryota
- Kingdom: Animalia
- Phylum: Arthropoda
- Class: Insecta
- Order: Coleoptera
- Suborder: Polyphaga
- Infraorder: Staphyliniformia
- Family: Histeridae
- Tribe: Acritini
- Genus: Aeletes; Horn, 1873

= Aeletes =

Genus of beetles

Aeletes is a genus of clown beetles in the family Histeridae. There are more than 80 described species in Aeletes.

== Species ==
These 87 species belong to the genus Aeletes:

- Aeletes aciculatus Wenzel, 1944
- Aeletes aldridgei Yélamos, 1998
- Aeletes angustisternus (Scott, 1908)
- Aeletes angustus (Scott, 1908)
- Aeletes assimilis Wenzel, 1944
- Aeletes atomarius (Aubé, 1842)
- Aeletes basalis (J.L.LeConte, 1851)
- Aeletes blackburni Yélamos, 1998
- Aeletes brevisternus (Marseul, 1856)
- Aeletes clarulus (Reitter, 1884)
- Aeletes concentricus Blackburn & Sharp, 1885
- Aeletes confusus (Blackburn, 1885)
- Aeletes crenatus Wenzel, 1944
- Aeletes ctenomyphilus (Bickhardt, 1920)
- Aeletes daubani (Scott, 1913)
- Aeletes davidsoni (Scott, 1913)
- Aeletes dybasi Wenzel, 1944
- Aeletes espanoli Yélamos, 1998
- Aeletes eutretus (Scott, 1908)
- Aeletes facilis Blackburn & Sharp, 1885
- Aeletes flavitarsis Lewis, 1879
- Aeletes floridae (Marseul, 1862)
- Aeletes fordi Yélamos, 1998
- Aeletes franzi Gomy, 1984
- Aeletes fryeri (Scott, 1913)
- Aeletes fuscus Yélamos, 1998
- Aeletes gemmula (Wollaston, 1865)
- Aeletes germanus (Scott, 1908)
- Aeletes gulliver (Marseul, 1856)
- Aeletes haleakalae (Scott, 1908)
- Aeletes hawaiiensis (Scott, 1908)
- Aeletes insignis Casey, 1916
- Aeletes insolitus (Scott, 1908)
- Aeletes jamaicus Gomy, 1981
- Aeletes kaalae Yélamos, 1998
- Aeletes kauaiensis (Scott, 1908)
- Aeletes kilaueae Yélamos, 1998
- Aeletes kukuiae (Scott, 1908)
- Aeletes laevis (Scott, 1908)
- Aeletes laeviusculus (Marseul, 1856)
- Aeletes lanaiensis (Scott, 1908)
- Aeletes leai Gomy, 1983
- Aeletes lewisi Yélamos, 1998
- Aeletes lissosternus Wenzel, 1944
- Aeletes longipes Blackburn & Sharp, 1885
- Aeletes makaweliae (Scott, 1908)
- Aeletes mauiae (Scott, 1908)
- Aeletes minor (Scott, 1908)
- Aeletes mohihiensis Yélamos, 1998
- Aeletes molokaiae (Scott, 1908)
- Aeletes monticola Blackburn & Sharp, 1885
- Aeletes neckerensis Yélamos, 1998
- Aeletes negrei Yélamos, 1998
- Aeletes nepos (Scott, 1908)
- Aeletes oahuensis Yélamos, 1998
- Aeletes orioli Yélamos, 1998
- Aeletes ornatus (Scott, 1908)
- Aeletes oromii Yélamos, 1995
- Aeletes parvulus (Scott, 1908)
- Aeletes perkinsi (Scott, 1908)
- Aeletes poeyi (Marseul, 1862)
- Aeletes politus (J. L. LeConte, 1853)
- Aeletes pulchellus (Scott, 1908)
- Aeletes punctatus (Scott, 1908)
- Aeletes rectistrius Wenzel, 1944
- Aeletes romiae Yélamos, 1998
- Aeletes rugiceps Wenzel, 1944
- Aeletes rugipygus Wenzel, 1944
- Aeletes samuelsoni Yélamos, 1998
- Aeletes schwarzi Wenzel, 1944
- Aeletes scotti Yélamos, 1998
- Aeletes sculptus (Scott, 1908)
- Aeletes sharpi Yélamos, 1998
- Aeletes similis (Scott, 1908)
- Aeletes simplex (J. E. LeConte, 1844)
- Aeletes simpliculus (Marseul, 1856)
- Aeletes solitarius (Scott, 1908)
- Aeletes subalatus (Scott, 1908)
- Aeletes subbasalis (Scott, 1908)
- Aeletes subniger Wenzel, 1944
- Aeletes subrotundus (Scott, 1908)
- Aeletes sulcipennis Wenzel, 1944
- Aeletes swezeyi Yélamos, 1998
- Aeletes termitophilus Wenzel, 1944
- Aeletes troglodytes Wenzel, 1944
- Aeletes waianaae (Scott, 1908)
- Aeletes zimmermani Yélamos, 1998
