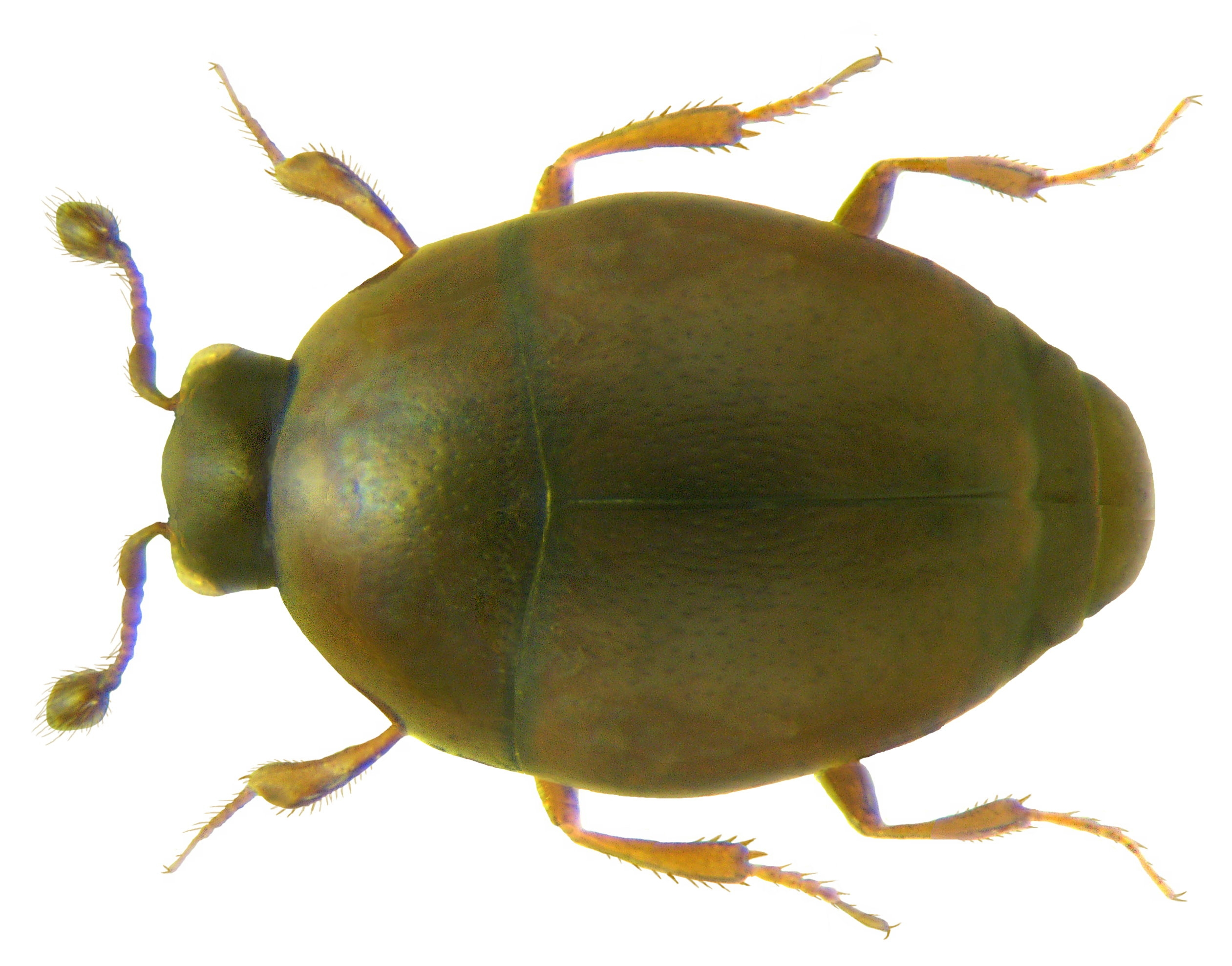

Scientific classification
- Kingdom: Animalia
- Phylum: Arthropoda
- Class: Insecta
- Order: Coleoptera
- Suborder: Polyphaga
- Infraorder: Staphyliniformia
- Family: Histeridae
- Genus: Acritus
- Species: A. nigricornis

Binomial name
- Acritus nigricornis (Hoffmann, 1803)

= Acritus nigricornis =

Species of beetle

Acritus nigricornis is a species of clown beetle in the family Histeridae. It is found in Africa, Australia, Europe, Northern Asia (excluding China), North America, and Southern Asia.

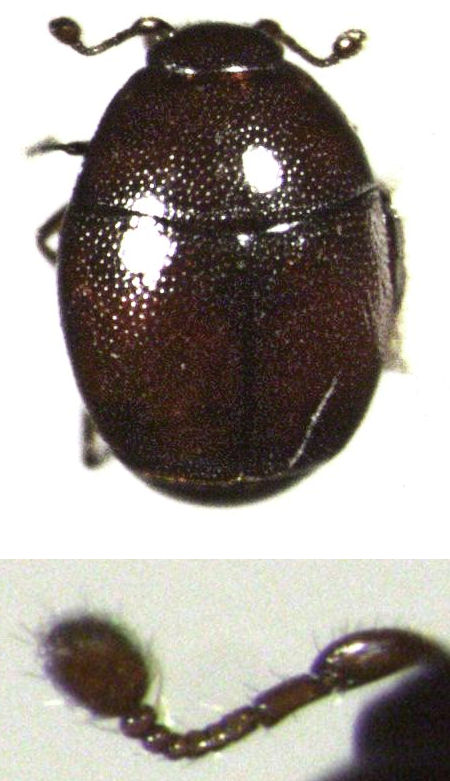
