= Abaeletes =

Scientific classification
- Kingdom: Animalia
- Phylum: Arthropoda
- Class: Insecta
- Order: Coleoptera
- Suborder: Polyphaga
- Infraorder: Staphyliniformia
- Family: Histeridae
- Subfamily: Abraeinae
- Genus: Abaeletes; Cooman, 1940

Species
- Abaeletes coomani Gomy, 1977; Abaeletes perroti (Cooman, 1940)

Genus of beetles

Abaeletes is a genus of beetles belonging to the subfamily Abraeinae under the family Histeridae.

== Species ==
Two species are assigned to this genus:

- Abaeletes coomani Gomy, 1977
- Abaeletes perroti (Cooman, 1940)
