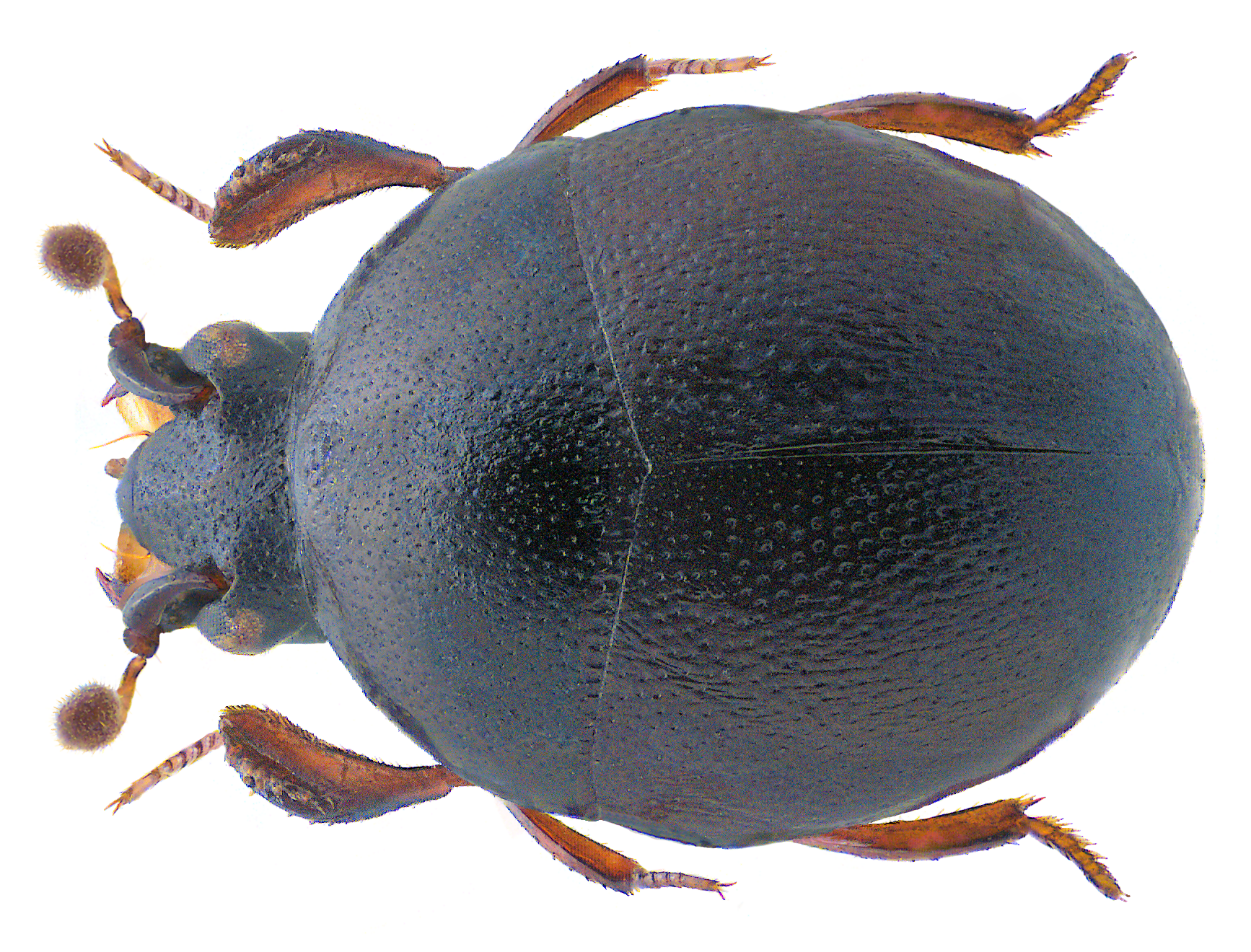
- Chaetabraeus controversus

Scientific classification
- Kingdom: Animalia
- Phylum: Arthropoda
- Class: Insecta
- Order: Coleoptera
- Suborder: Polyphaga
- Infraorder: Staphyliniformia
- Family: Histeridae
- Tribe: Abraeini
- Genus: Chaetabraeus; Portevin, 1929

= Chaetabraeus =

Genus of beetles

Chaetabraeus is a genus of clown beetles in the family Histeridae. There are more than 40 described species in Chaetabraeus.

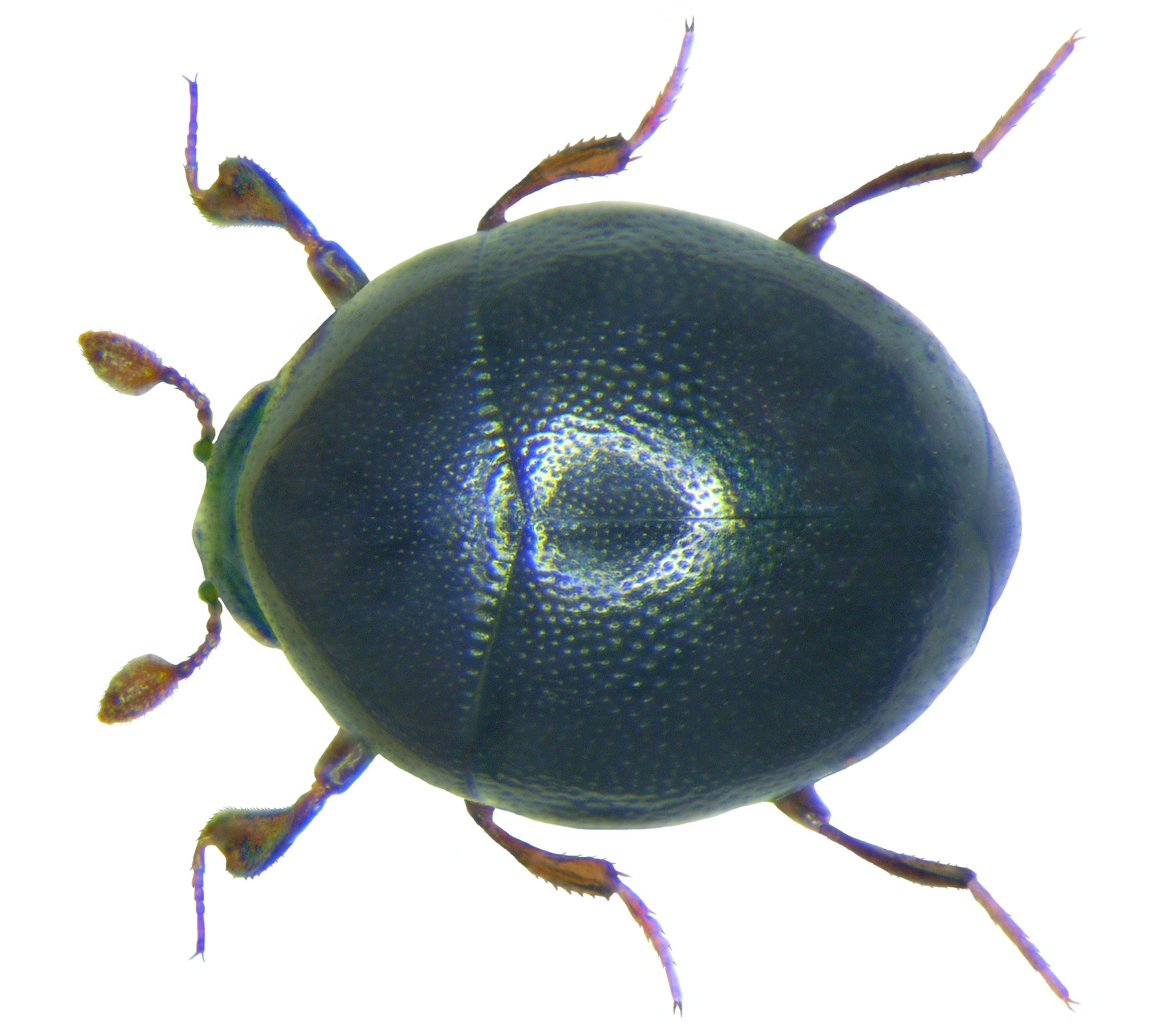
Chaetabraeus cyclonotus

== Species ==
These 45 species belong to the genus Chaetabraeus:

- Chaetabraeus alluaudi (G.Müller, 1944)
- Chaetabraeus andrewesi Gomy, 1984
- Chaetabraeus bacanioformis (Bickhardt, 1921)
- Chaetabraeus bacchusi Gomy, 1984
- Chaetabraeus bonzicus (Marseul, 1873)
- Chaetabraeus brasavolai (G.Müller, 1944)
- Chaetabraeus chandleri Mazur, 1991
- Chaetabraeus cicatricatus (Thérond, 1959)
- Chaetabraeus cinaedus Mazur, 1997
- Chaetabraeus cohaeres (Lewis, 1898)
- Chaetabraeus connexus (Cooman, 1935)
- Chaetabraeus controversus (Cooman, 1935)
- Chaetabraeus convexus (Reitter, 1884)
- Chaetabraeus corradinii (G.Müller, 1944)
- Chaetabraeus curtulus (Fåhraeus, 1851)
- Chaetabraeus cyclonotus (Marseul, 1856)
- Chaetabraeus durandi (Thérond, 1967)
- Chaetabraeus echinaceus (Schmidt, 1895)
- Chaetabraeus fakir (Lewis, 1905)
- Chaetabraeus gandhii Gomy, 2009
- Chaetabraeus globulus (Creutzer, 1799)
- Chaetabraeus granosus (Motschulsky, 1863)
- Chaetabraeus heterocnemis Vienna, 1991
- Chaetabraeus kanaari Gomy, 1992
- Chaetabraeus lucidus (Peyerimhoff, 1917)
- Chaetabraeus masai Gomy, 2017
- Chaetabraeus misellus (Fåhraeus, 1851)
- Chaetabraeus mulleri Thérond, 1967
- Chaetabraeus nibouchei Gomy, 1996
- Chaetabraeus orientalis (Lewis, 1907)
- Chaetabraeus paria (Marseul, 1856)
- Chaetabraeus persetifer (Desbordes, 1919)
- Chaetabraeus reticulatus (Thérond, 1959)
- Chaetabraeus rugicollis (Marseul, 1856)
- Chaetabraeus sabuthomasi Gomy, 2009
- Chaetabraeus schawalleri Gomy, 1992
- Chaetabraeus setosellus (Bickhardt, 1921)
- Chaetabraeus setulosus (Fåhraeus, 1851)
- Chaetabraeus sphaericus (Marseul, 1856)
- Chaetabraeus spiculator (Thérond, 1959)
- Chaetabraeus streitoi Gomy, 1996
- Chaetabraeus subconvexus (Kryzhanovskij, 1976)
- Chaetabraeus subsetosulus (G.Müller, 1944)
- Chaetabraeus sulcatorugosus (Kanaar, 1983)
- Chaetabraeus tuberosus (Cooman, 1931)
