= Teretrius =

Scientific classification
- Kingdom: Animalia
- Phylum: Arthropoda
- Class: Insecta
- Order: Coleoptera
- Suborder: Polyphaga
- Infraorder: Staphyliniformia
- Family: Histeridae
- Tribe: Teretriini
- Genus: Teretrius; Erichson, 1834

Genus of beetles

Teretrius is a genus of clown beetles in the family Histeridae. There are at least 70 described species in Teretrius.

== Species ==
These 77 species belong to the genus Teretrius:

- Teretrius accaciae Reitter, 1900
- Teretrius aestivus Lewis, 1885
- Teretrius africus Lewis, 1908
- Teretrius afrus (Lewis, 1893)
- Teretrius alfierii Pic, 1910
- Teretrius alluaudi Desbordes, 1916
- Teretrius americanus J. E. LeConte, 1860
- Teretrius angelae Gomy, 2007
- Teretrius antelatus Lewis, 1914
- Teretrius argentinus (Lewis, 1907)
- Teretrius australis Lewis, 1893
- Teretrius basalis Lewis, 1889
- Teretrius biformis (Cooman, 1933)
- Teretrius biguttatus (Lewis, 1910)
- Teretrius braganzae Lewis, 1900
- Teretrius cariniger (Cooman, 1933)
- Teretrius cingulus (Lewis, 1891)
- Teretrius convexisternus Bickhardt, 1921
- Teretrius corticalis Wollaston, 1867
- Teretrius cylindratus Desbordes, 1930
- Teretrius cylindrellus Casey, 1916
- Teretrius cylindricus Wollaston, 1864
- Teretrius doddi Blackburn, 1903
- Teretrius ellenbergeri Desbordes, 1914
- Teretrius erythraeus Lewis, 1908
- Teretrius fabricii Mazur, 1972
- Teretrius facetus (Lewis, 1879)
- Teretrius feae Lewis, 1888
- Teretrius formosus (Lewis, 1915)
- Teretrius gigas (Mazur, 1978)
- Teretrius gracilis (Blackburn, 1903)
- Teretrius grouvellei (Lewis, 1891)
- Teretrius gussakovskii Kryzhanovskij in Kryzhanovskij and Reichardt, 1976
- Teretrius immarginatus (Lewis, 1888)
- Teretrius indus Lewis, 1902
- Teretrius insinuans Marseul, 1862
- Teretrius intrusus Marseul, 1870
- Teretrius kraatzi Marseul, 1862
- Teretrius latebricola Lewis, 1901
- Teretrius lesnei Desbordes, 1930
- Teretrius longulus Lewis, 1888
- Teretrius marginatus Lewis, 1910
- Teretrius marshalli Lewis, 1902
- Teretrius melburnius Marseul, 1870
- Teretrius mogul Lewis, 1911
- Teretrius montanus Horn, 1880
- Teretrius mozambicus Marseul, 1856
- Teretrius nigrescens (Lewis, 1891)
- Teretrius novaeguineae (Bickhardt, 1918)
- Teretrius obliquulus J. L. LeConte, 1857
- Teretrius orbus Lewis, 1888
- Teretrius parasita Marseul, 1862
- Teretrius peruanus Erichson, 1847
- Teretrius pilimanus Marseul, 1856
- Teretrius placitus Horn, 1880
- Teretrius poneli Gomy, 2005
- Teretrius praedator Lewis, 1911
- Teretrius pulex Fairmaire, 1877
- Teretrius punctulatus Fahraeus in Boheman, 1851
- Teretrius pusillus (Desbordes, 1930)
- Teretrius quadristriatus Lewis, 1902
- Teretrius rajah (Lewis, 1892)
- Teretrius rectistrius Lewis, 1906
- Teretrius robinsoni Gomy, 1983
- Teretrius rogueti Gomy, 2015
- Teretrius rufulus Marseul, 1856
- Teretrius schoutedeni Desbordes, 1924
- Teretrius segnis Marseul, 1856
- Teretrius shibatai Ôhara, 2008
- Teretrius somerseti Marseul, 1879
- Teretrius sorellensis (Blackburn, 1903)
- Teretrius stebbingii (Lewis, 1901)
- Teretrius subelongatus Desbordes, 1916
- Teretrius taichii Ôhara, 2008
- Teretrius tuberculifrons (Mazur, 1978)
- Teretrius walkeri Lewis, 1892
- Teretrius zambezianus Desbordes, 1930
