= Teretriosoma =

Scientific classification
- Kingdom: Animalia
- Phylum: Arthropoda
- Class: Insecta
- Order: Coleoptera
- Suborder: Polyphaga
- Infraorder: Staphyliniformia
- Family: Histeridae
- Tribe: Teretriini
- Genus: Teretriosoma; Horn, 1873

Genus of beetles

Teretriosoma is a genus of clown beetles in the family Histeridae. There are about 11 described species in Teretriosoma.

== Species ==
These 11 species belong to the genus Teretriosoma:

- Teretriosoma cavifrons Lewis, 1888
- Teretriosoma chalybaeum Horn, 1873
- Teretriosoma conigerum Lewis, 1888
- Teretriosoma festivum Lewis, 1879
- Teretriosoma paradoxum Lewis, 1888
- Teretriosoma pinguis Casey
- Teretriosoma prasinum Lewis, 1902
- Teretriosoma sexualis Schaeffer
- Teretriosoma unicorne Lewis, 1901
- Teretriosoma virens (Marseul, 1856)
- Teretriosoma viridicatum Lewis, 1891
