= Arizonacritus =

Scientific classification
- Kingdom: Animalia
- Phylum: Arthropoda
- Class: Insecta
- Order: Coleoptera
- Suborder: Polyphaga
- Infraorder: Staphyliniformia
- Family: Histeridae
- Tribe: Acritini
- Genus: Arizonacritus; Gomy & Warner, 2013

Genus of beetles

Arizonacritus is a genus of clown beetles in the family Histeridae. There is one described species in Arizonacritus, A. talayesvai.
