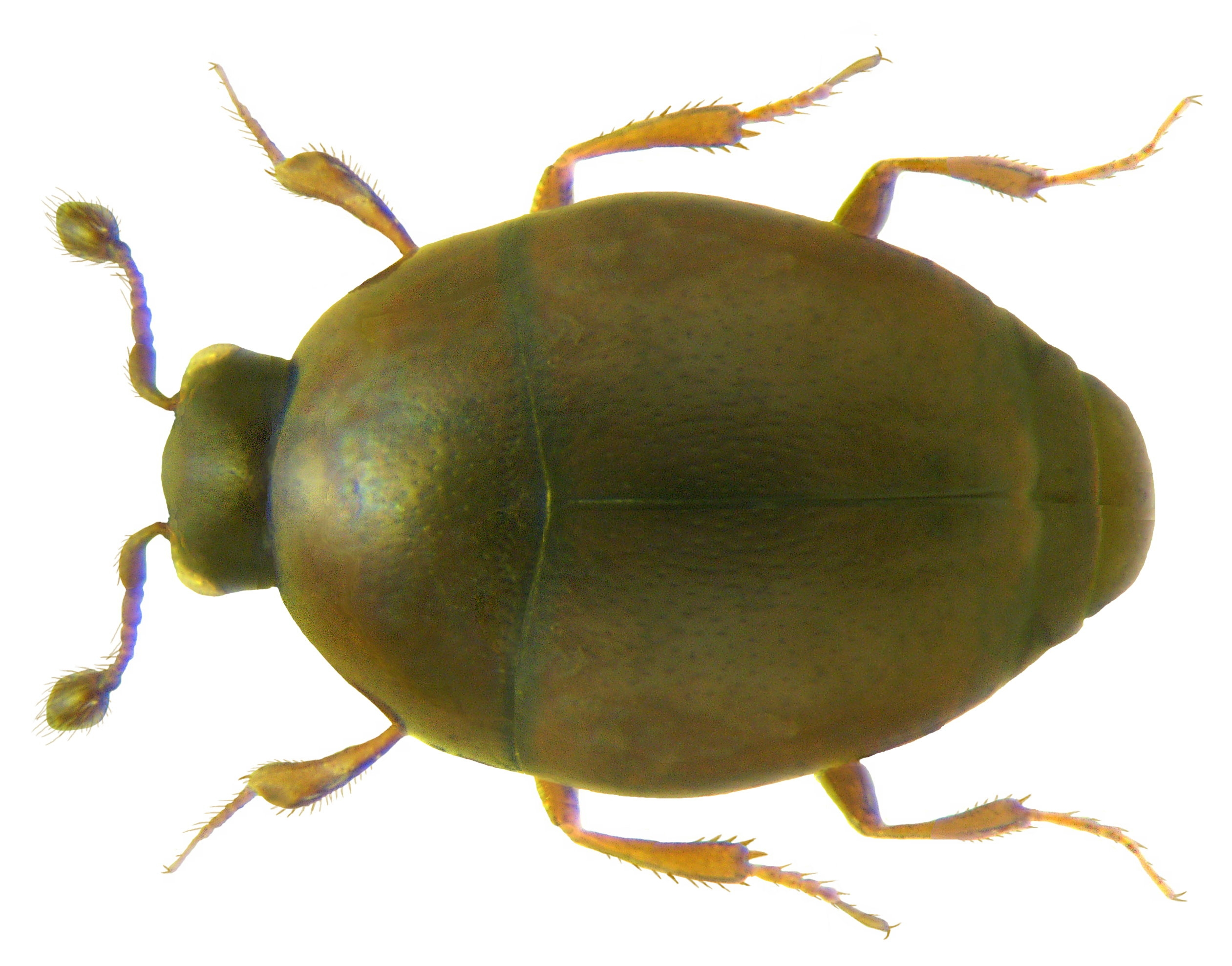
- Acritus nigricornis

Scientific classification
- Domain: Eukaryota
- Kingdom: Animalia
- Phylum: Arthropoda
- Class: Insecta
- Order: Coleoptera
- Suborder: Polyphaga
- Infraorder: Staphyliniformia
- Family: Histeridae
- Tribe: Acritini
- Genus: Acritus; LeConte, 1853

= Acritus =

Genus of beetles

Acritus is a genus of clown beetles in the family Histeridae. There are at least 110 described species in Acritus.

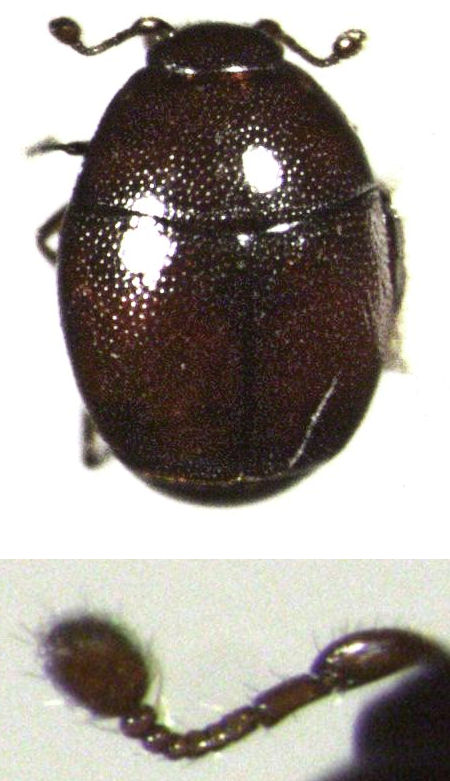
Acritus nigricornis

== See also ==
- List of Acritus species
