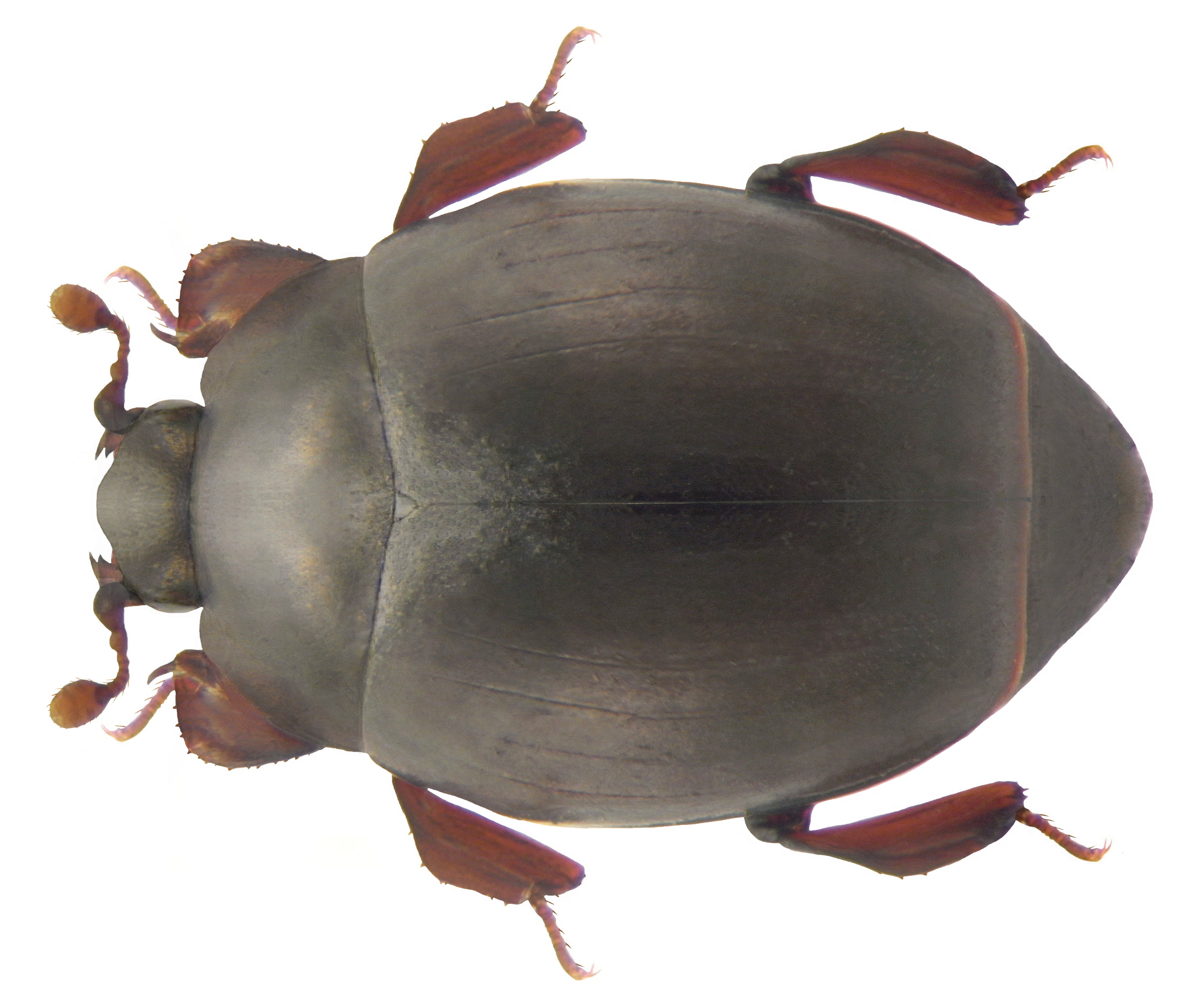
- Dendrophilus pygmaeus

Scientific classification
- Kingdom: Animalia
- Phylum: Arthropoda
- Class: Insecta
- Order: Coleoptera
- Suborder: Polyphaga
- Infraorder: Staphyliniformia
- Family: Histeridae
- Subfamily: Dendrophilinae; Reitter, 1909

Tribes
- Anapleini Olexa, 1982; Bacaniini Kryzhanovskij & Reichardt, 1976; Dendrophilini Reitter, 1909; Paromalini Reitter, 1909

= Dendrophilinae =

Subfamily of beetles

Dendrophilinae is a subfamily of clown beetles in the family Histeridae. There are more than 30 genera and 490 described species in Dendrophilinae.

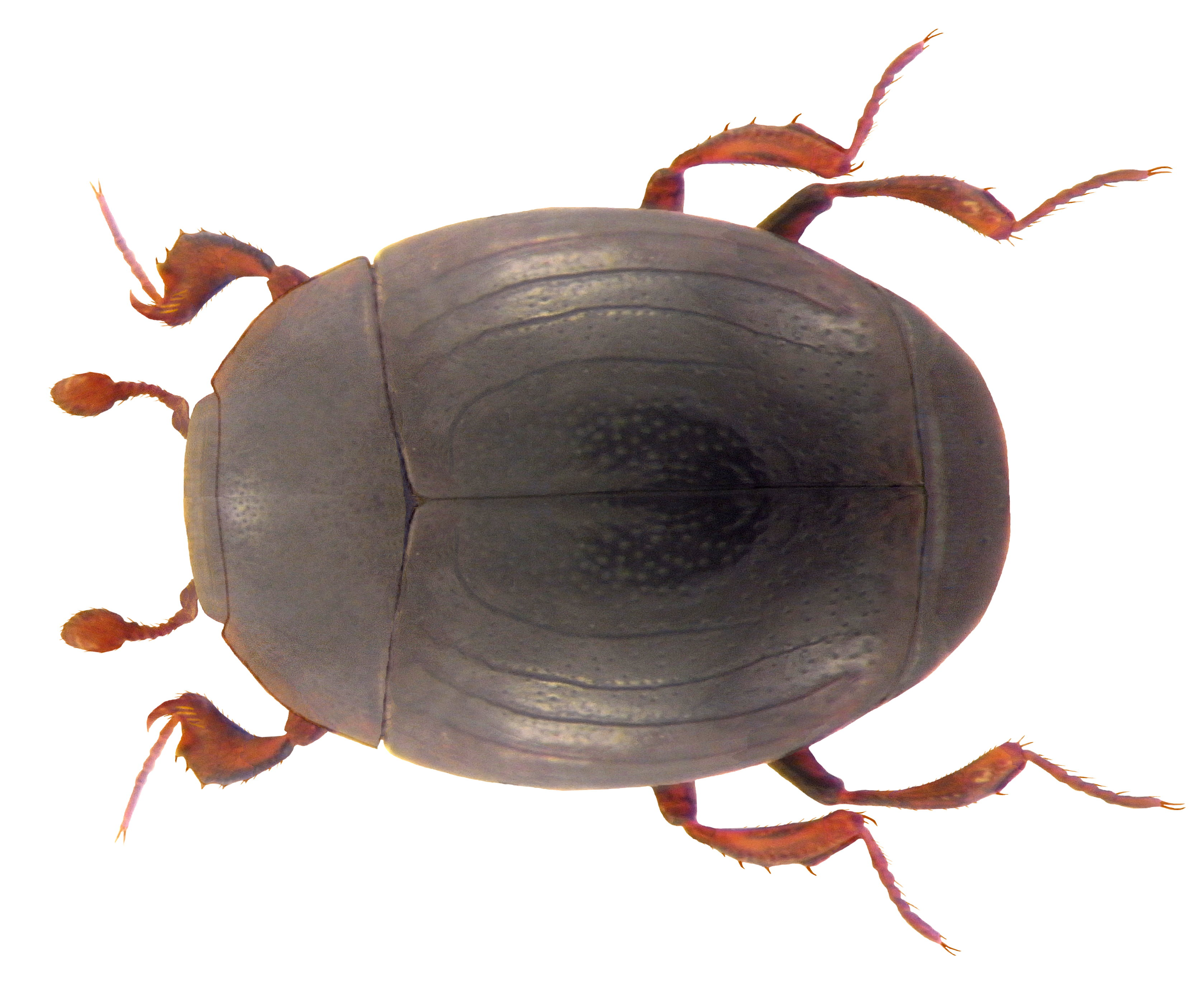
Kissister minimus

== Genera ==
These 33 genera belong to the subfamily Dendrophilinae:

- Abraeomorphus Reitter, 1886
- Africanister Gomy, 2010
- Anapleus Horn, 1873
- Antongilus Gomy, 1969
- Athomalus Mazur, 1993
- Australanius Gomy, 2009
- Australomalus Mazur, 1981
- Bacaniomorphus Mazur, 1989
- Bacanius J. L. LeConte, 1853
- Carcinops Marseul, 1855
- Chaetobacanius Gomy, 1977
- Coomanister Kryzhanovskij, 1972
- Cryptomalus Mazur, 1993
- Cyclobacanius G. Müller, 1925
- Degallierister Gomy, 2001
- Dendrophilus Leach, 1817
- Diplostix Bickhardt, 1921
- Eulomalus Cooman, 1937
- Eutriptus Wollaston, 1862
- Geocolus Wenzel, 1944
- Globodiplostix Vienna & Yélamos, 2006
- Indodiplostix Vienna, 2007
- Juliettinus Gomy, 2010
- Kissister Marseul, 1862
- Mullerister Cooman, 1936
- Neobacanius G. Müller, 1925
- Pachylomalus Schmidt, 1897
- Paromalus Erichson, 1834
- Platylomalus Cooman, 1948
- Sardulus Patrizi, 1955
- Triballodes Schmidt, 1885
- Troglobacanius Vomero, 1974
- Xestipyge Marseul, 1862
