= Dendrophilini =

Subfamily of beetles

Dendrophilini is a subfamily of clown beetles in the family Histeridae. It was first described by Reitter in 1909. It contains 2 genera with 14 species. Recorded observations have been made mostly in the northern hemisphere, with the majority being made in Sweden, France, the United States, and Switzerland.

== Genera and species ==
- Dendrophilus
  - Dendrophilus proditor
  - Dendrophilus sulcatus
  - Dendrophilus californicus
  - Dendrophilus kiteleyi
  - Dendrophilus opacus
  - Dendrophilus punctatus
  - Dendrophilus pygmaeus
  - Dendrophilus tubercularis
  - Dendrophilus tularensis
  - Dendrophilus xavieri
- Kissister
  - Kissister congoensis
  - Kissister fuentei
  - Kissister minimus
  - Kissister vaulogeri
