= List of Platylomalus species =

This is a list of species in the genus Platylomalus.

== Platylomalus species ==
- Platylomalus acisternus (Desbordes, 1914)
- Platylomalus aequalis (Say, 1825)
- Platylomalus alluaudi (Schmidt, 1893)
- Platylomalus arrowi Gomy, 1983
- Platylomalus bavicola Cooman, 1948
- Platylomalus biarculus (Marseul, 1870)
- Platylomalus bicavatus Cooman, 1955
- Platylomalus biellipticus Vienna, 1983
- Platylomalus calcuttanus Ôhara, 1989
- Platylomalus carinipygus Cooman, 1955
- Platylomalus ceylanicus (Motschulsky, 1863)
- Platylomalus cincticauda (Cooman, 1937)
- Platylomalus clavis (Marseul, 1879)
- Platylomalus complanatus (Panzer, 1797)
- Platylomalus cribratus (Lea, 1925)
- Platylomalus derasus (Schmidt, 1897)
- Platylomalus digitatus (Wollaston, 1867)
- Platylomalus erythraeus (G. Müller, 1938)
- Platylomalus evanescens (Marseul, 1879)
- Platylomalus exiguus (Fahraeus in Boheman, 1851)
- Platylomalus feae (Lewis, 1888)
- Platylomalus forestieri (Marseul, 1870)
- Platylomalus fossisternus (Cooman, 1936)
- Platylomalus fujisanus (Lewis, 1892)
- Platylomalus gardineri (Scott, 1913)
- Platylomalus goliath (Lewis, 1891)
- Platylomalus horni (Cooman, 1935)
- Platylomalus indicus (Lewis, 1892)
- Platylomalus inflexus Zhang and Zhou, 2007
- Platylomalus instabilis Vienna, 1983
- Platylomalus kabakovi Kryzhanovskij in Kryzhanovskij and Reichardt, 1976
- Platylomalus kusuii Ôhara, 1994
- Platylomalus lenticula (Schmidt, 1893)
- Platylomalus longicornis (Lewis, 1905)
- Platylomalus mendicus (Lewis, 1892)
- Platylomalus modiglianii (Schmidt, 1897)
- Platylomalus musicus (Marseul, 1864)
- Platylomalus niponensis (Lewis, 1899)
- Platylomalus nudipectus (Cooman, 1937)
- Platylomalus oceanitis (Marseul, 1855)
- Platylomalus osellai Vienna, 1983
- Platylomalus parvopunctatus (Lea, 1925)
- Platylomalus persimilis (Lewis, 1888)
- Platylomalus pseudosuturalis (Cooman, 1937)
- Platylomalus saucius (Blackburn, 1903)
- Platylomalus sauteri (Bickhardt, 1912)
- Platylomalus schultheissi (Schmidt, 1897)
- Platylomalus sinuaticeps (Cooman, 1937)
- Platylomalus submetallicus (Lewis, 1892)
- Platylomalus tcibodae (Marseul, 1879)
- Platylomalus terraereginae (Blackburn, 1903)
- Platylomalus therondi Vienna, 1983
- Platylomalus tonkinensis (Cooman, 1937)
- Platylomalus umbilicatus (Marseul, 1870)
- Platylomalus varionotus Vienna, 1983
- Platylomalus venator (Cooman, 1941)
- Platylomalus viaticus (Lewis, 1892)
- Platylomalus victoriae (Marseul, 1870)
- Platylomalus vittula (Marseul, 1879)
- Platylomalus zypi (Cooman, 1937)
