= Abraeomorphus himalayae =

Scientific classification
- Domain: Eukaryota
- Kingdom: Animalia
- Phylum: Arthropoda
- Class: Insecta
- Order: Coleoptera
- Suborder: Polyphaga
- Infraorder: Staphyliniformia
- Family: Histeridae
- Subfamily: Dendrophilinae
- Tribe: Bacaniini
- Genus: Abraeomorphus
- Species: A. himalayae

Binomial name
- Abraeomorphus himalayae Gomy, 1980

Species of beetle

Abraeomorphus himalayae is a species of beetle first discovered in 1980. No sub-species are listed in the Catalogue of Life.
