= Xestipyge geminatum =

Scientific classification
- Kingdom: Animalia
- Phylum: Arthropoda
- Clade: Pancrustacea
- Class: Insecta
- Order: Coleoptera
- Suborder: Polyphaga
- Infraorder: Staphyliniformia
- Family: Histeridae
- Subfamily: Dendrophilinae
- Tribe: Paromalini
- Genus: Xestipyge
- Species: X. geminatum

Binomial name
- Xestipyge geminatum (J. E. LeConte, 1860)

Species of beetle

Xestipyge geminatum is a species of clown beetles in the family Histeridae. It is found in North America.
