= Platylomalus oceanitis =

Scientific classification
- Kingdom: Animalia
- Phylum: Arthropoda
- Class: Insecta
- Order: Coleoptera
- Suborder: Polyphaga
- Infraorder: Staphyliniformia
- Family: Histeridae
- Genus: Platylomalus
- Species: P. oceanitis

Binomial name
- Platylomalus oceanitis (Marseul, 1855)

Species of beetle

Platylomalus oceanitis is a species of clown beetle found in many Oriental countries including India, Sri Lanka, Indonesia, Philippines and Australia.
