= Abraeomorphus formosanus =

Scientific classification
- Kingdom: Animalia
- Phylum: Arthropoda
- Class: Insecta
- Order: Coleoptera
- Suborder: Polyphaga
- Infraorder: Staphyliniformia
- Family: Histeridae
- Genus: Abraeomorphus
- Species: A. formosanus

Binomial name
- Abraeomorphus formosanus (Hisamatsu, 1965)

Synonyms
- Bacanius formosanus Hisamatsu, 1965

Species of beetle

Abraeomorphus formosanus is a species of beetle first described by S. Hisamatsu in 1965. It is endemic to Taiwan. No subspecies are listed in Catalogue of Life.
