= Paromalus complexus =

Scientific classification
- Kingdom: Animalia
- Phylum: Arthropoda
- Class: Insecta
- Order: Coleoptera
- Suborder: Polyphaga
- Infraorder: Staphyliniformia
- Family: Histeridae
- Genus: Paromalus
- Species: P. complexus

Binomial name
- Paromalus complexus Casey, 1893

Species of beetle

Paromalus complexus is a species of clown beetle in the family Histeridae. It is found in North America.
