= Paromalus debilis =

Scientific classification
- Kingdom: Animalia
- Phylum: Arthropoda
- Clade: Pancrustacea
- Class: Insecta
- Order: Coleoptera
- Suborder: Polyphaga
- Infraorder: Staphyliniformia
- Family: Histeridae
- Genus: Paromalus
- Species: P. debilis

Binomial name
- Paromalus debilis J. L. LeConte, 1879

Species of beetle

Paromalus debilis is a species of clown beetle in the family Histeridae. It is found in North America.
