= Paromalus teres =

Scientific classification
- Kingdom: Animalia
- Phylum: Arthropoda
- Class: Insecta
- Order: Coleoptera
- Suborder: Polyphaga
- Infraorder: Staphyliniformia
- Family: Histeridae
- Genus: Paromalus
- Species: P. teres

Binomial name
- Paromalus teres J. L. LeConte, 1878

Species of beetle

Paromalus teres is a species of clown beetle in the family Histeridae. It is found in North America.
