= Platylomalus aequalis =

Scientific classification
- Kingdom: Animalia
- Phylum: Arthropoda
- Class: Insecta
- Order: Coleoptera
- Suborder: Polyphaga
- Infraorder: Staphyliniformia
- Family: Histeridae
- Genus: Platylomalus
- Species: P. aequalis

Binomial name
- Platylomalus aequalis (Say, 1825)

Species of beetle

Platylomalus aequalis is a species of clown beetles in the family Histeridae. It is found in North America.
