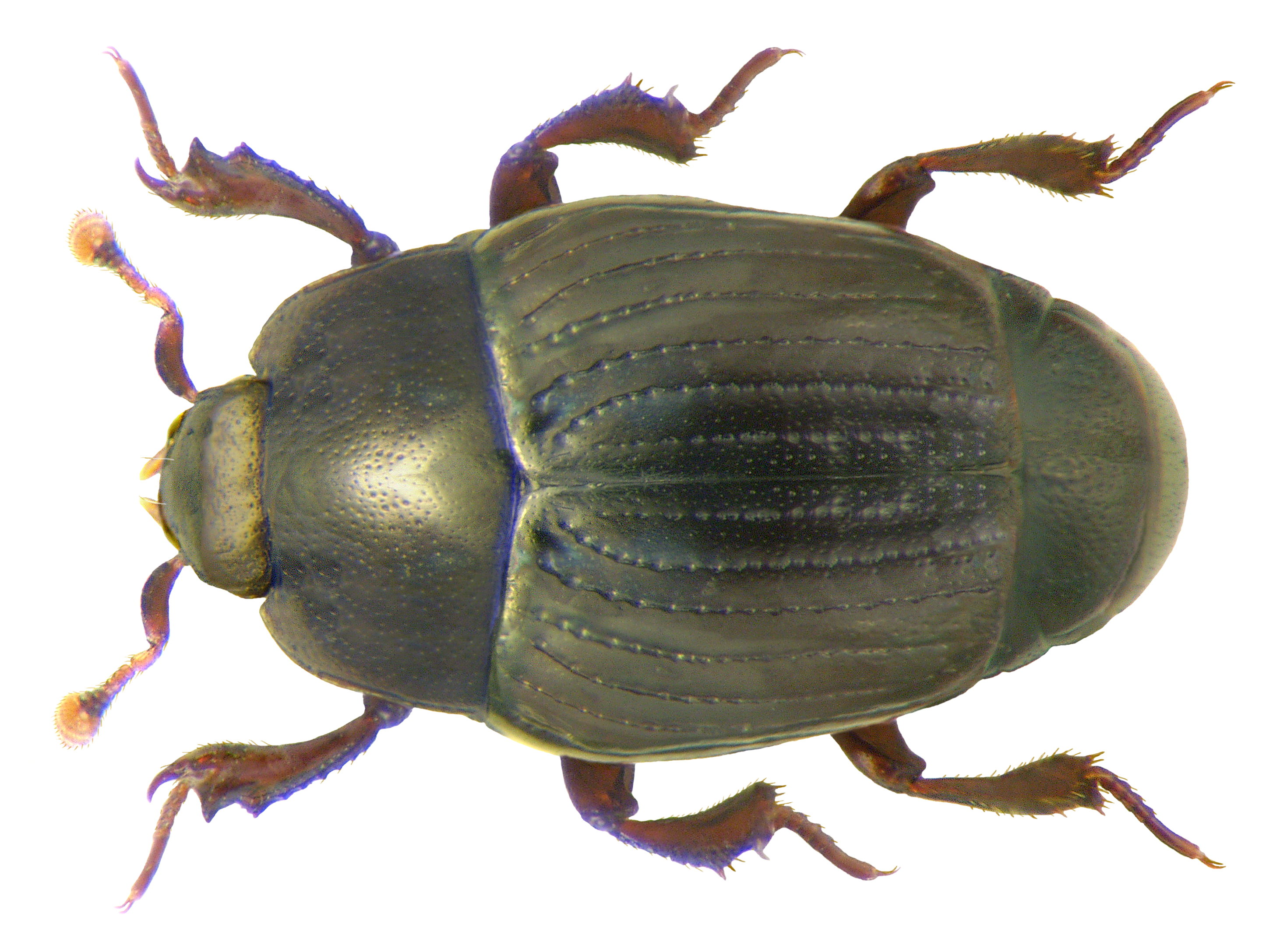

Scientific classification
- Kingdom: Animalia
- Phylum: Arthropoda
- Class: Insecta
- Order: Coleoptera
- Suborder: Polyphaga
- Infraorder: Staphyliniformia
- Family: Histeridae
- Genus: Carcinops
- Species: C. pumilio

Binomial name
- Carcinops pumilio (Erichson, 1834)

= Carcinops pumilio =

Species of beetle

Carcinops pumilio, the poultryhouse pill beetle, is a species of clown beetle in the family Histeridae. It is found in Africa, Europe, Northern Asia (excluding China), and North America.
