= Xestipyge conjunctum =

Scientific classification
- Kingdom: Animalia
- Phylum: Arthropoda
- Class: Insecta
- Order: Coleoptera
- Suborder: Polyphaga
- Infraorder: Staphyliniformia
- Family: Histeridae
- Genus: Xestipyge
- Species: X. conjunctum

Binomial name
- Xestipyge conjunctum (Say, 1825)

Species of beetle

Xestipyge conjunctum is a species of clown beetle in the family Histeridae. It is found in North America, ranging from Ontario to Florida and Texas. It is between 2.2 and 2.5 mm in length, and belongs to the tribe Paromalini.
