= Anapleus =

Scientific classification
- Kingdom: Animalia
- Phylum: Arthropoda
- Clade: Pancrustacea
- Class: Insecta
- Order: Coleoptera
- Suborder: Polyphaga
- Infraorder: Staphyliniformia
- Family: Histeridae
- Subfamily: Dendrophilinae
- Genus: Anapleus; Horn, 1873

Genus of beetles

Anapleus is a genus of clown beetles that belongs to the family Histeridae.

== Species ==
These 16 species belong to the genus Anapleus:

- Anapleus compactus Casey, 1893
- Anapleus cyclonotus (Lewis, 1892)
- Anapleus davidneelae Gomy, 1995
- Anapleus gracilipes (Kryzhanovskij, 1966)
- Anapleus hagai Ôhara, 1994
- Anapleus jelineki Olexa, 1982
- Anapleus marginatus (J. L. LeConte, 1853)
- Anapleus mexicanus Casey, 1916
- Anapleus monticola Mazur, 1987
- Anapleus nakanei Ôhara, 1994
- Anapleus nomurai Ôhara, 1994
- Anapleus pescheli Lackner T, 2026
- Anapleus raddei (Reitter, 1877)
- Anapleus semen (Lewis, 1884)
- Anapleus stigmaticus (Schmidt, 1892)
- Anapleus wenzeli Vomero, 1977
- Anapleus wewalkai Olexa, 1982
