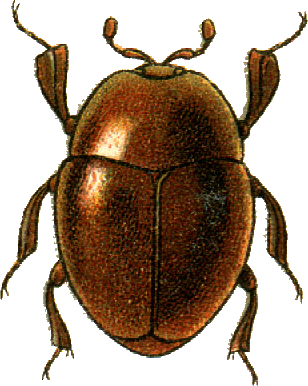

Scientific classification
- Kingdom: Animalia
- Phylum: Arthropoda
- Class: Insecta
- Order: Coleoptera
- Suborder: Polyphaga
- Infraorder: Staphyliniformia
- Family: Histeridae
- Genus: Abraeomorphus
- Species: A. minutissimus

Binomial name
- Abraeomorphus minutissimus (Reitter, 1884)

= Abraeomorphus minutissimus =

Species of beetle

Abraeomorphus minutissimus is a species of beetle first described by Edmund Reitter in 1884. No subspecies are listed in Catalogue of Life.
