= Carcinops viridicollis =

Scientific classification
- Kingdom: Animalia
- Phylum: Arthropoda
- Class: Insecta
- Order: Coleoptera
- Suborder: Polyphaga
- Infraorder: Staphyliniformia
- Family: Histeridae
- Genus: Carcinops
- Species: C. viridicollis

Binomial name
- Carcinops viridicollis Marseul, 1855

Species of beetle

Carcinops viridicollis is a species of clown beetle in the family Histeridae. It is found in Central America and North America.
