= Xestipyge =

Scientific classification
- Kingdom: Animalia
- Phylum: Arthropoda
- Class: Insecta
- Order: Coleoptera
- Suborder: Polyphaga
- Infraorder: Staphyliniformia
- Family: Histeridae
- Subfamily: Dendrophilinae
- Tribe: Paromalini
- Genus: Xestipyge

Genus of beetles

Xestipyge is a genus of clown beetles in the family Histeridae. There are at least 10 described species in Xestipyge.

== Species ==
- Xestipyge conjunctum (Say, 1825)
- Xestipyge currax (Marseul, 1870)
- Xestipyge garbigliettii (Marseul, 1867)
- Xestipyge geminatum (J. E. LeConte, 1860)
- Xestipyge multistriatus (Lewis, 1888)
- Xestipyge ornatum (Reitter in Leder, 1881)
- Xestipyge puncticulatum Desbordes, 1919
- Xestipyge radulum (Marseul, 1862)
- Xestipyge simplex Vienna, 1993
- Xestipyge skelleyi Warner, 2021
