= Bacanius hatchi =

Scientific classification
- Kingdom: Animalia
- Phylum: Arthropoda
- Class: Insecta
- Order: Coleoptera
- Suborder: Polyphaga
- Infraorder: Staphyliniformia
- Family: Histeridae
- Genus: Bacanius
- Species: B. hatchi

Binomial name
- Bacanius hatchi Wenzel, 1960

Species of beetle

Bacanius hatchi is a species of clown beetle in the family Histeridae. It is found in North America.
