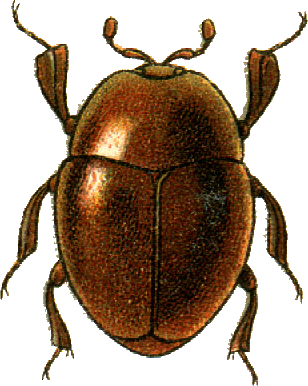
- Abraeomorphus minutissimus

Scientific classification
- Kingdom: Animalia
- Phylum: Arthropoda
- Class: Insecta
- Order: Coleoptera
- Suborder: Polyphaga
- Infraorder: Staphyliniformia
- Family: Histeridae
- Subfamily: Dendrophilinae
- Tribe: Bacaniini; Kryzhanovskij & Reichardt, 1976

= Bacaniini =

Tribe of beetles

Bacaniini is a tribe of clown beetles in the family Histeridae. There are about 16 genera and more than 170 described species in Bacaniini.

== Genera ==
These 16 genera belong to the tribe Bacaniini:

- Abraeomorphus Reitter, 1886
- Africanister Gomy, 2010
- Antongilus Gomy, 1969
- Australanius Gomy, 2009
- Bacaniomorphus Mazur, 1989
- Bacanius J. L. LeConte, 1853
- Chaetobacanius Gomy, 1977
- Cyclobacanius G. Müller, 1925
- Degallierister Gomy, 2001
- Geocolus Wenzel, 1944
- Juliettinus Gomy, 2010
- Mullerister Cooman, 1936
- Neobacanius G. Müller, 1925
- Sardulus Patrizi, 1955
- Triballodes Schmidt, 1885
- Troglobacanius Vomero, 1974
