= Bacanius tantillus =

Scientific classification
- Kingdom: Animalia
- Phylum: Arthropoda
- Clade: Pancrustacea
- Class: Insecta
- Order: Coleoptera
- Suborder: Polyphaga
- Infraorder: Staphyliniformia
- Family: Histeridae
- Genus: Bacanius
- Species: B. tantillus

Binomial name
- Bacanius tantillus J. L. LeConte, 1853

Species of beetle

Bacanius tantillus is a species of clown beetle in the family Histeridae. It is found in North America.
