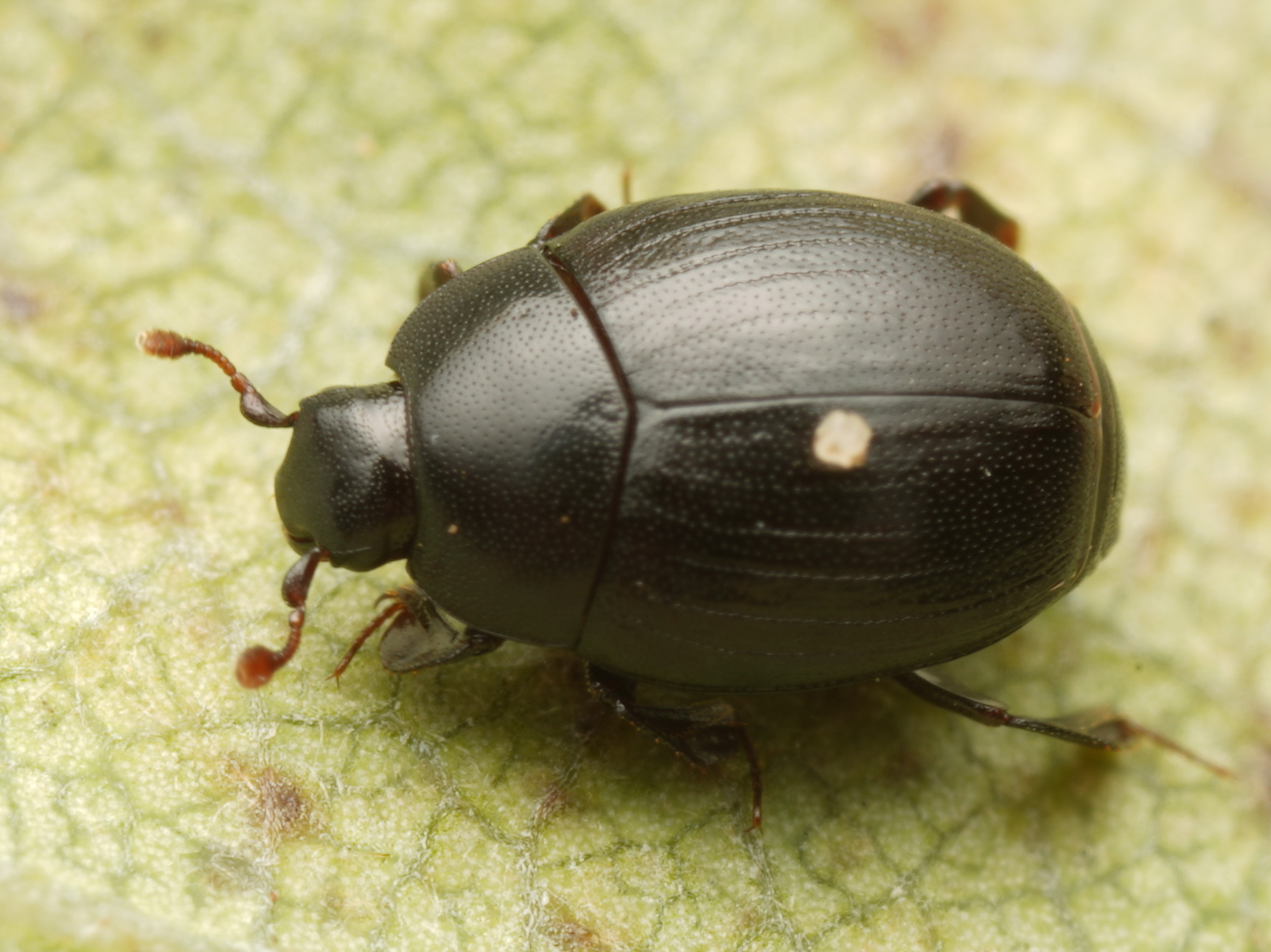

Scientific classification
- Kingdom: Animalia
- Phylum: Arthropoda
- Class: Insecta
- Order: Coleoptera
- Suborder: Polyphaga
- Infraorder: Staphyliniformia
- Family: Histeridae
- Genus: Dendrophilus
- Species: D. punctatus

Binomial name
- Dendrophilus punctatus (Herbst, 1791)

= Dendrophilus punctatus =

Species of beetle

Dendrophilus punctatus is a species of clown beetle in the family Histeridae. It is found in Europe and Northern Asia (excluding China) and North America.

== Subspecies ==
These two subspecies belong to the species Dendrophilus punctatus:

- Dendrophilus punctatus championi Lewis, 1886
- Dendrophilus punctatus punctatus (Herbst, 1791)
