= Paromalus =

Scientific classification
- Kingdom: Animalia
- Phylum: Arthropoda
- Class: Insecta
- Order: Coleoptera
- Suborder: Polyphaga
- Infraorder: Staphyliniformia
- Family: Histeridae
- Tribe: Paromalini
- Genus: Paromalus; Erichson, 1834

Genus of beetles

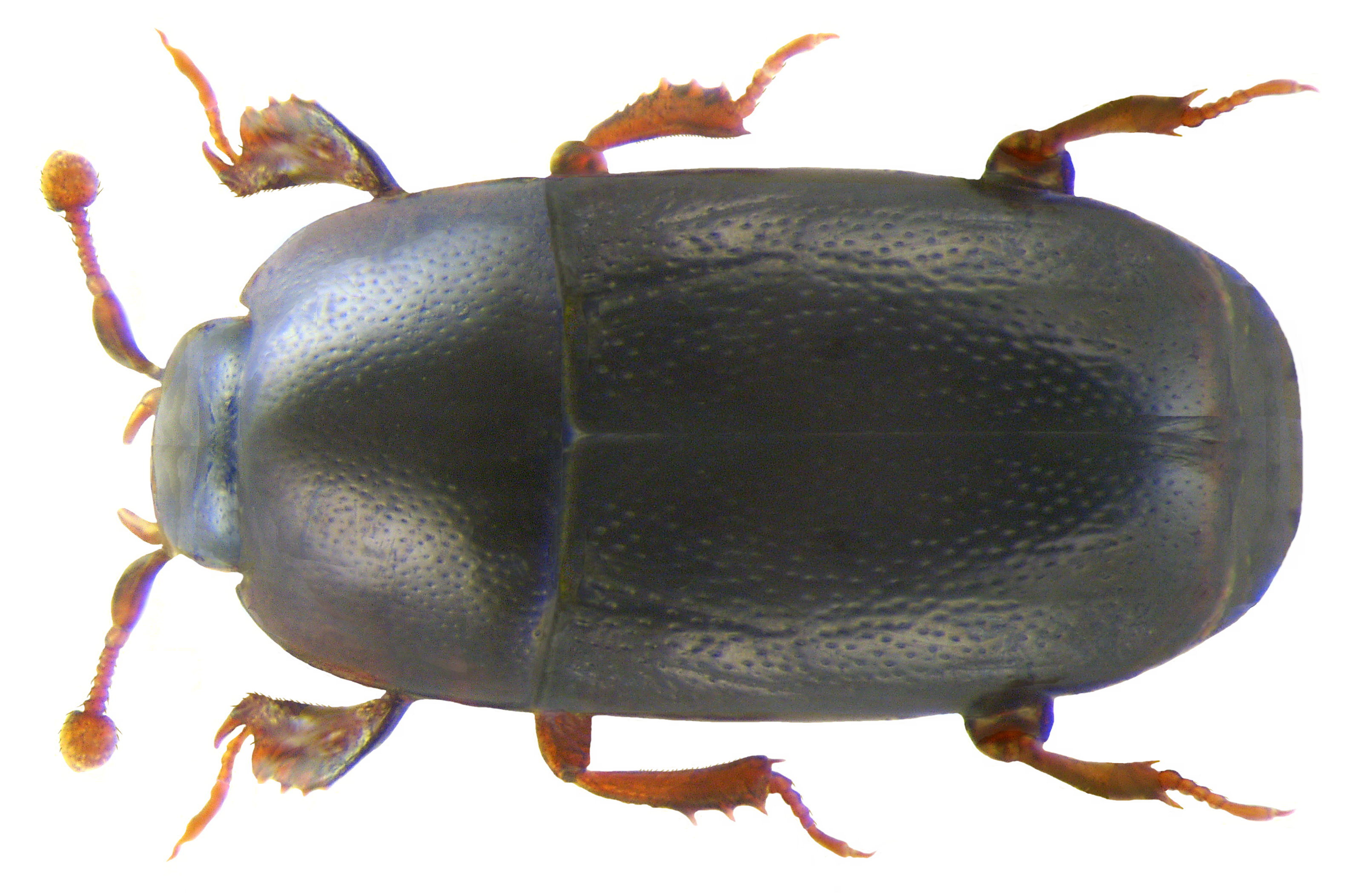
Paromalus parallelepipedus

Paromalus is a genus of clown beetles in the family Histeridae. There are at least 60 described species in Paromalus.

== Species ==
- Paromalus acutangulus Zhang and Zhou, 2007
- Paromalus addendus Schmidt, 1896
- Paromalus babaulti (Cooman, 1935)
- Paromalus bicinctus Marseul, 1870
- Paromalus bilineatus Marseul, 1862
- Paromalus bistriatus Erichson, 1834
- Paromalus causticus Marseul, 1862
- Paromalus complexus Casey, 1893
- Paromalus concentricus Marseul, 1870
- Paromalus convexus Marseul, 1855
- Paromalus cordipygus Marseul, 1862
- Paromalus debilis J. L. LeConte, 1879
- Paromalus didymus Marseul, 1855
- Paromalus difficilis Horn, 1874
- Paromalus durangoensis (Casey, 1916)
- Paromalus elongatus (Lewis, 1907)
- Paromalus filum Reitter, 1884
- Paromalus fissus Lewis, 1888
- Paromalus flavicornis (Herbst, 1791)
- Paromalus hariolus Marseul, 1862
- Paromalus hispaniolae Marseul, 1870
- Paromalus infimus Marseul, 1855
- Paromalus inflatus Lewis, 1888
- Paromalus insularis Vienna, 1983
- Paromalus inunctus Marseul, 1862
- Paromalus irregularis Schmidt, 1896
- Paromalus jejunus Lewis, 1888
- Paromalus junior Cooman, 1948
- Paromalus laevisternus Mazur, 1990
- Paromalus leleupi Wenzel, 1976
- Paromalus luderti Marseul, 1862
- Paromalus malus Marseul, 1862
- Paromalus mancus Casey, 1893
- Paromalus mysticus (Casey, 1916)
- Paromalus notabilis Lewis, 1888
- Paromalus oculipygus Marseul, 1870
- Paromalus omineus Lewis, 1892
- Paromalus parallelepipedus (Herbst, 1791)
- Paromalus parallelus J. E. LeConte, 1860
- Paromalus picturatus Kapler, 1999
- Paromalus productus Marseul, 1855
- Paromalus pupillus Lewis, 1888
- Paromalus rogalis Lewis, 1888
- Paromalus rugigenius Marseul, 1870
- Paromalus sagillatus Lewis, 1888
- Paromalus samba Mazur, 1981
- Paromalus sculptipectus Marseul, 1879
- Paromalus seeversi (Wenzel, 1936)
- Paromalus selectus Lewis, 1888
- Paromalus seminulum Erichson, 1834
- Paromalus similis Lewis, 1888
- Paromalus simplicistrius Schmidt, 1885
- Paromalus sincerus Lewis, 1888
- Paromalus sobrinus Lewis, 1888
- Paromalus sulcatus Lewis, 1888
- Paromalus teres J. L. LeConte, 1878
- Paromalus tibetanus Zhang and Zhou, 2007
- Paromalus trifolium Marseul, 1862
- Paromalus truncatus (Lewis, 1907)
- Paromalus ussuricus Kapler, 1993
- Paromalus vernalis Lewis, 1892
- Paromalus viduus (Cooman, 1935)
