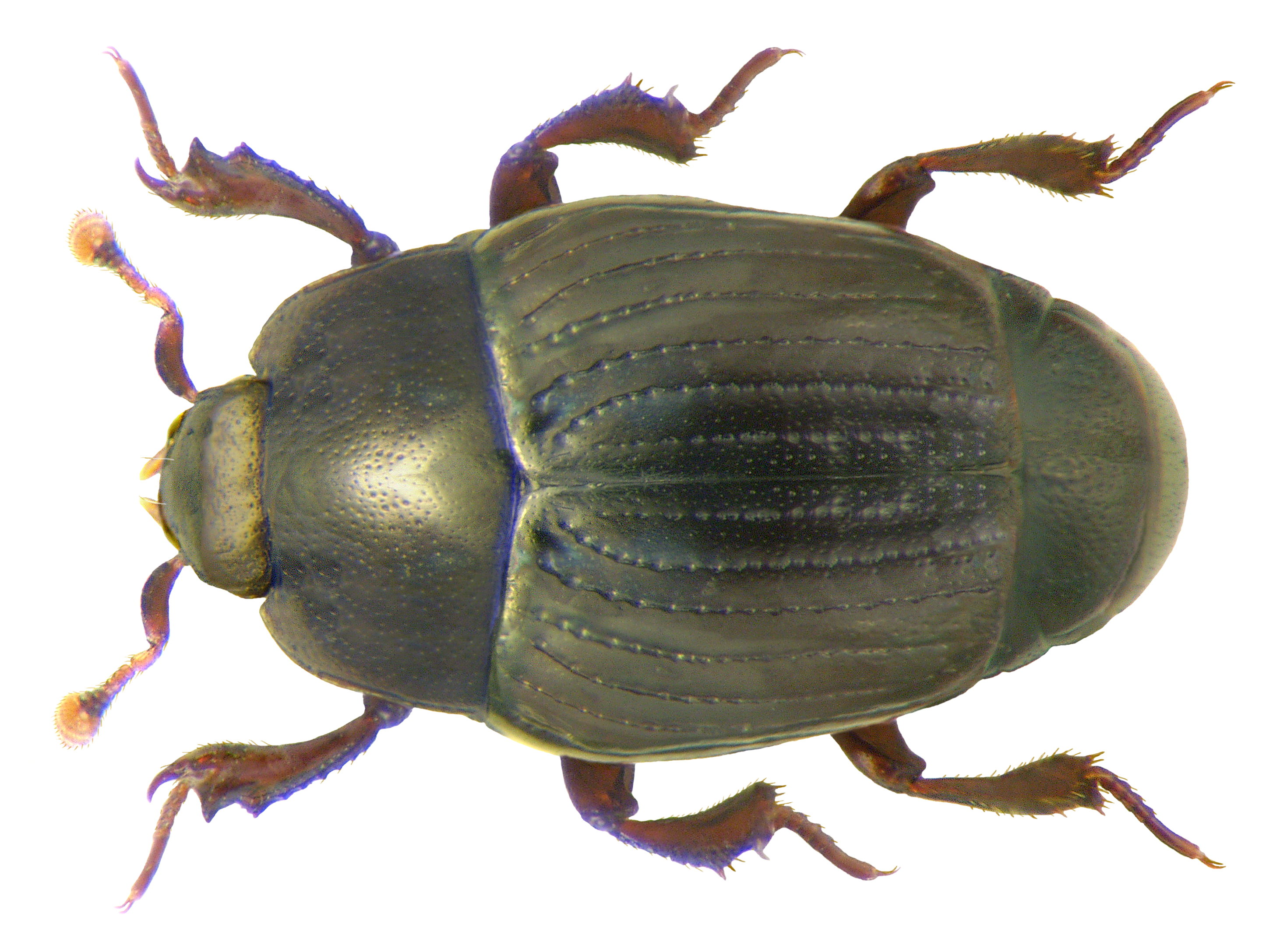
- Carcinops pumilio

Scientific classification
- Kingdom: Animalia
- Phylum: Arthropoda
- Class: Insecta
- Order: Coleoptera
- Suborder: Polyphaga
- Infraorder: Staphyliniformia
- Family: Histeridae
- Tribe: Paromalini
- Genus: Carcinops; Marseul, 1855

= Carcinops =

Genus of beetles

Carcinops is a genus of clown beetles in the family Histeridae. There are at least 50 described species in Carcinops.

== Species ==
- Carcinops alberti Desbordes, 1919
- Carcinops assimilis Wenzel, 1944
- Carcinops atrata Lewis, 1888
- Carcinops bellula Marseul, 1862
- Carcinops biinterrupta Wenzel and Dybas, 1941
- Carcinops blandfordi Lewis, 1894
- Carcinops carinata Wenzel and Dybas, 1941
- Carcinops cavisternum Lewis, 1888
- Carcinops collaris Marseul, 1862
- Carcinops consors (J. L. LeConte, 1851)
- Carcinops corticis Marseul, 1862
- Carcinops cribripuga Wenzel, 1944
- Carcinops cuprina Marseul, 1862
- Carcinops densepunctata Wenzel, 1944
- Carcinops dominicana Marseul, 1855
- Carcinops exigua Wenzel, 1944
- Carcinops eximia Lewis, 1888
- Carcinops fumosa Lewis, 1888
- Carcinops galapagoensis Van Dyke, 1953
- Carcinops gilensis (J. L. LeConte, 1851)
- Carcinops lanista Marseul, 1862
- Carcinops latiuscula G. Müller, 1946
- Carcinops lauta Zimmermann in J. L. LeConte, 1869
- Carcinops merula Marseul, 1862
- Carcinops mimetica (Horn, 1873)
- Carcinops misella Marseul, 1855
- Carcinops miserula Marseul, 1862
- Carcinops opuntiae (J. L. LeConte, 1851)
- Carcinops ovatula Lewis, 1888
- Carcinops papagoana Casey, 1893
- Carcinops parvula J. E. LeConte, 1860
- Carcinops penatii Zhang and Zhou, 2007
- Carcinops peruviana Kirsch, 1873
- Carcinops plaumanni Wenzel, 1944
- Carcinops prasina Lewis, 1899
- Carcinops pumilio (Erichson, 1834) (poultryhouse pill beetle)
- Carcinops punctinotum Lewis, 1888
- Carcinops salome Bickhardt, 1921
- Carcinops schwarzi Wenzel, 1944
- Carcinops scotti G. Müller, 1944
- Carcinops sinensis Lewis, 1909
- Carcinops subcarinata Kanaar, 1997
- Carcinops tantilla Marseul, 1855
- Carcinops tejonica (Horn, 1873)
- Carcinops tejonicus
- Carcinops tenella (Erichson, 1834)
- Carcinops tibiale Lea, 1925
- Carcinops tristicula Marseul, 1870
- Carcinops troglodytes (Paykull, 1811)
- Carcinops tuberata Wenzel, 1944
- Carcinops viridicollis Marseul, 1855
- Carcinops wenzeli Reese & Swanson, 2017
