= Abraeomorphus =

Scientific classification
- Kingdom: Animalia
- Phylum: Arthropoda
- Clade: Pancrustacea
- Class: Insecta
- Order: Coleoptera
- Suborder: Polyphaga
- Infraorder: Staphyliniformia
- Family: Histeridae
- Tribe: Bacaniini
- Genus: Abraeomorphus; Reitter, 1886

Genus of insects

Abraeomorphus is a genus of beetles belonging to the family Histeridae.

Species:

- Abraeomorphus atomarius (Sharp, 1885)
- Abraeomorphus besucheti Mazur, 1977
- Abraeomorphus formosanus (Hisamatsu, 1965)
- Abraeomorphus himalayae Gomy, 1980
- Abraeomorphus indosinensis Mazur, 1990
- Abraeomorphus indus Mazur, 1987
- Abraeomorphus minutissimus (Reitter, 1884)
- Abraeomorphus novaeguineae Thérond, 1965
- Abraeomorphus punctulus (Reitter, 1884)
- Abraeomorphus topali Gomy, 1981
