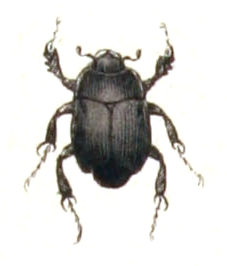
- Dendrophilus punctatus

Scientific classification
- Kingdom: Animalia
- Phylum: Arthropoda
- Class: Insecta
- Order: Coleoptera
- Suborder: Polyphaga
- Infraorder: Staphyliniformia
- Family: Histeridae
- Subfamily: Dendrophilinae
- Genus: Dendrophilus; Leach, 1817

= Dendrophilus =

Genus of beetles

Dendrophilus is a genus of clown beetles in the family Histeridae. There are about 10 described species in Dendrophilus.

== Species ==
These 10 species belong to the genus Dendrophilus:

- Dendrophilus californicus Horn, 1892
- Dendrophilus kiteleyi Bousquet & Laplante, 1999
- Dendrophilus opacus Ross, 1940
- Dendrophilus proditor (Reichardt, 1925)
- Dendrophilus punctatus (Herbst, 1791)
- Dendrophilus pygmaeus (Linnaeus, 1758)
- Dendrophilus sulcatus Motschulsky, 1845
- Dendrophilus tubercularis Lackner, 2005
- Dendrophilus tularensis Ross, 1937
- Dendrophilus xavieri Marseul, 1873
