= Bacanius =

Scientific classification
- Kingdom: Animalia
- Phylum: Arthropoda
- Clade: Pancrustacea
- Class: Insecta
- Order: Coleoptera
- Suborder: Polyphaga
- Infraorder: Staphyliniformia
- Family: Histeridae
- Tribe: Bacaniini
- Genus: Bacanius; J. L. LeConte, 1853

Genus of beetles

Bacanius is a genus of clown beetles in the family Histeridae. There are more than 70 described species in Bacanius.

== Species ==
These 77 species belong to the genus Bacanius:

- Bacanius acicularis (Fauvel, 1891)
- Bacanius acuminatus Casey, 1893
- Bacanius africanus Bickhardt, 1911
- Bacanius albiusi Gomy, 1978
- Bacanius ambiguus Schmidt, 1893
- Bacanius andrei Gomy, 2001
- Bacanius angolensis Thérond, 1962
- Bacanius auctus (Marseul, 1879)
- Bacanius baloghi Gomy, 1977
- Bacanius bicolor Mazur, 1975
- Bacanius borbonicus Gomy, 1970
- Bacanius bougainvillei Gomy, 1976
- Bacanius cavisternus Gomy, 1980
- Bacanius charriei Gomy, 1978
- Bacanius collettei Gomy, 1999
- Bacanius comorensis Gomy, 1978
- Bacanius consobrinus (Aubé, 1850)
- Bacanius convergens Schmidt, 1896
- Bacanius cooki Gomy, 1976
- Bacanius crenulatus Wenzel, 1944
- Bacanius creolus Gomy, 1970
- Bacanius debilitans Casey, 1893
- Bacanius dentrecasteauxi Gomy, 1976
- Bacanius fauveli Wenzel, 1955
- Bacanius ferrugineus Bickhardt, 1918
- Bacanius franzi Gomy, 1970
- Bacanius gestroi Schmidt, 1893
- Bacanius globulinus Casey, 1893
- Bacanius gomyi Yélamos, 1996
- Bacanius gourvesi Gomy, 1981
- Bacanius granulosus Gomy, 1980
- Bacanius greensladei Gomy, 1988
- Bacanius hatchi Wenzel, 1960
- Bacanius hemisphaeroides (Marseul, 1879)
- Bacanius humicola Marseul, 1856
- Bacanius insularis Gomy, 1978
- Bacanius irlanda Mazur & Sawoniewicz, 2008
- Bacanius kapleri Gomy, 1999
- Bacanius kaszabi Gomy, 1977
- Bacanius kurbatovi Gomy & Tishechkin, 1993
- Bacanius lableri (Reichardt, 1941)
- Bacanius laperousei Gomy, 1976
- Bacanius lawrencei Gomy, 1992
- Bacanius leleupi Thérond, 1965
- Bacanius lucidus Thérond, 1965
- Bacanius mameti Gomy, 1970
- Bacanius martensi Gomy, 1992
- Bacanius mikado (Lewis, 1892)
- Bacanius misellus J.L.LeConte, 1853
- Bacanius montanus Mazur & Sawoniewicz, 2008
- Bacanius niponixua Lewis, 1879
- Bacanius nobleti Gomy, 1981
- Bacanius norfolcensis (Lea, 1925)
- Bacanius papulatus Cooman, 1933
- Bacanius peckorum Gomy, 1992
- Bacanius permirus (Marseul, 1879)
- Bacanius perreti Gomy, 1981
- Bacanius peyrierasi Gomy, 1969
- Bacanius punctiformis (J. L. LeConte, 1853)
- Bacanius punctiger (Fauvel, 1891)
- Bacanius quartus Thérond, 1967
- Bacanius remingtoni Wenzel, 1955
- Bacanius riftensis Gomy, 1981
- Bacanius rugisternus Wenzel, 1944
- Bacanius scalptus Lewis, 1888
- Bacanius schmidti Gomy, 1969
- Bacanius similis Mazur, 1975
- Bacanius subcarinatus Wenzel & Dybas, 1941
- Bacanius sulcilisternus Wenzel
- Bacanius sulcisternus Wenzel, 1944
- Bacanius suturalis (Lea, 1925)
- Bacanius szyszkoi Mazur, 1975
- Bacanius tantillus J. L. LeConte, 1853
- Bacanius therondi Gomy, 1969
- Bacanius vadoni Gomy, 1969
- Bacanius verschureni Thérond, 1959
- Bacanius wauensis Gomy, 1981
