= Dendrophilus opacus =

Scientific classification
- Kingdom: Animalia
- Phylum: Arthropoda
- Class: Insecta
- Order: Coleoptera
- Suborder: Polyphaga
- Infraorder: Staphyliniformia
- Family: Histeridae
- Genus: Dendrophilus
- Species: D. opacus

Binomial name
- Dendrophilus opacus Ross, 1940

Species of beetle

Dendrophilus opacus is a species of clown beetle in the family Histeridae. It is found in North America.
