= Dendrophilus xavieri =

Scientific classification
- Kingdom: Animalia
- Phylum: Arthropoda
- Clade: Pancrustacea
- Class: Insecta
- Order: Coleoptera
- Suborder: Polyphaga
- Infraorder: Staphyliniformia
- Family: Histeridae
- Genus: Dendrophilus
- Species: D. xavieri

Binomial name
- Dendrophilus xavieri Marseul, 1873

Species of beetle

Dendrophilus xavieri is a species of clown beetle in the family Histeridae. It is found in Europe and Northern Asia (excluding China), North America, and Southern Asia.
