= Geocolus =

Scientific classification
- Kingdom: Animalia
- Phylum: Arthropoda
- Class: Insecta
- Order: Coleoptera
- Suborder: Polyphaga
- Infraorder: Staphyliniformia
- Family: Histeridae
- Tribe: Bacaniini
- Genus: Geocolus; Wenzel, 1944

Genus of beetles

Geocolus is a genus of clown beetles in the family Histeridae. There is one described species in Geocolus, G. caecus.
