= Paromalini =

Scientific classification
- Kingdom: Animalia
- Phylum: Arthropoda
- Class: Insecta
- Order: Coleoptera
- Suborder: Polyphaga
- Infraorder: Staphyliniformia
- Family: Histeridae
- Subfamily: Dendrophilinae
- Tribe: Paromalini; Reitter, 1909

Tribe of beetles

Paromalini is a tribe of clown beetles in the family Histeridae. There are at least 270 described species in Paromalini.

== Genera ==
- Athomalus Mazur, 1993
- Australomalus Mazur, 1981
- Carcinops Marseul, 1855
- Coomanister Kryzhanovskij, 1972
- Cryptomalus Mazur, 1993
- Diplostix Bickhardt, 1921
- Eulomalus Cooman, 1937
- Eutriptus Wollaston, 1862
- Globodiplostix Vienna and Yélamos, 2006
- Indodiplostix Vienna, 2007
- Pachylomalus Schmidt, 1897
- Paromalus Erichson, 1834
- Platylomalus Cooman, 1948
- Xestipyge Marseul, 1862
