= Dendrophilus kiteleyi =

Scientific classification
- Kingdom: Animalia
- Phylum: Arthropoda
- Class: Insecta
- Order: Coleoptera
- Suborder: Polyphaga
- Infraorder: Staphyliniformia
- Family: Histeridae
- Genus: Dendrophilus
- Species: D. kiteleyi

Binomial name
- Dendrophilus kiteleyi Bousquet & Laplante, 1999

Species of beetle

Dendrophilus kiteleyi is a species of clown beetle in the family Histeridae. It is found in North America.
