= Antongilus =

Scientific classification
- Kingdom: Animalia
- Phylum: Arthropoda
- Clade: Pancrustacea
- Class: Insecta
- Order: Coleoptera
- Suborder: Polyphaga
- Infraorder: Staphyliniformia
- Family: Histeridae
- Genus: Antongilus; Gomy, 1969

Genus of beetles

Antongilus is a genus of beetles belonging to the family Histeridae.

Species:

- Antongilus bengalensis Mazur, 1989
- Antongilus biroi (Thérond, 1965)
- Antongilus cribrifrons Mazur, 1993
- Antongilus goliath (Mazur, 1975)
- Antongilus terricola (Gomy, 1969)
