= Platylomalus =

Scientific classification
- Kingdom: Animalia
- Phylum: Arthropoda
- Clade: Pancrustacea
- Class: Insecta
- Order: Coleoptera
- Suborder: Polyphaga
- Infraorder: Staphyliniformia
- Family: Histeridae
- Subfamily: Dendrophilinae
- Tribe: Paromalini
- Genus: Platylomalus; Cooman, 1948

Genus of beetles

Platylomalus is a genus of clown beetles in the family Histeridae. There are at least 60 described species in Platylomalus.

== See also ==
- List of Platylomalus species
