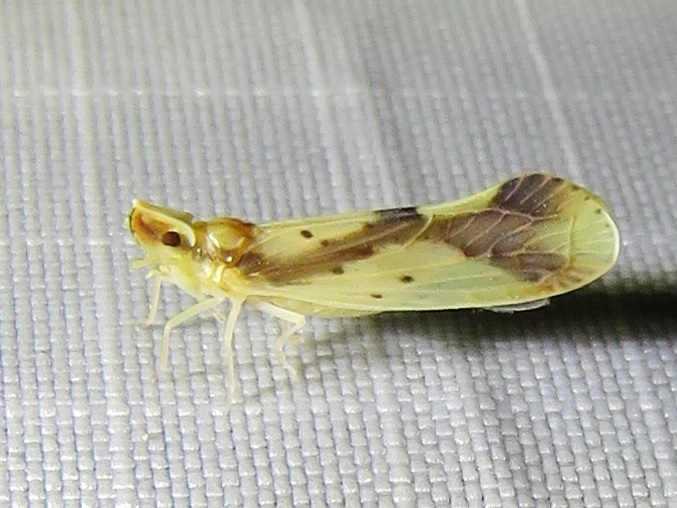
- Otiocerus reaumurii
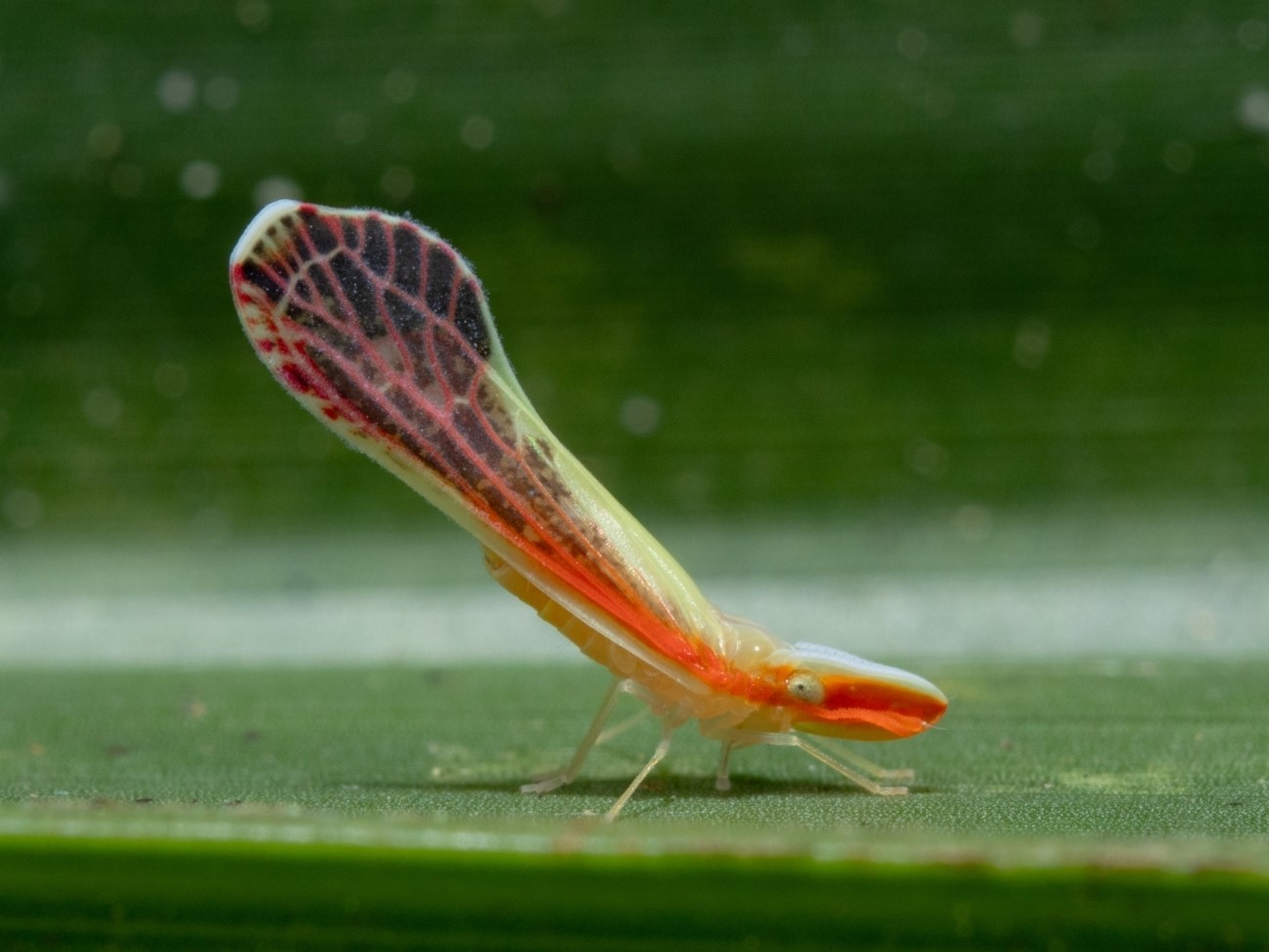
- Shellenius ballii

Scientific classification
- Kingdom: Animalia
- Phylum: Arthropoda
- Clade: Pancrustacea
- Class: Insecta
- Order: Hemiptera
- Suborder: Auchenorrhyncha
- Infraorder: Fulgoromorpha
- Family: Derbidae
- Subfamily: Otiocerinae; Muir, 1917

= Otiocerinae =

Subfamily of true bugs

Otiocerinae is a subfamily of planthoppers in the family Derbidae, with more than 100 genera and more than 1000 species. The species are widely distributed, especially in the Americas, Sub-Saharan Africa, as well as parts of Asia, Australia and the Pacific. Like in other Derbidae, the adults suck the sap of plants while the nymphs live mainly in decaying organic matter, for example under the bark of dead tree trunks, feeding on fungi.

== Description ==
The group of Otiocerinae was introduced by Frederick Muir in 1917, based on the wing venation of this group. It is named after the genus Otiocerus Kirby, 1821, the first genus which has been described in this subfamily. Otiocerus is found in central and eastern North America. Apart from the wing venation, the presence of a stridulation plate with a concave external margin on the hind wing is often cited as a diagnostic character for the subfamily Otiocerinae.

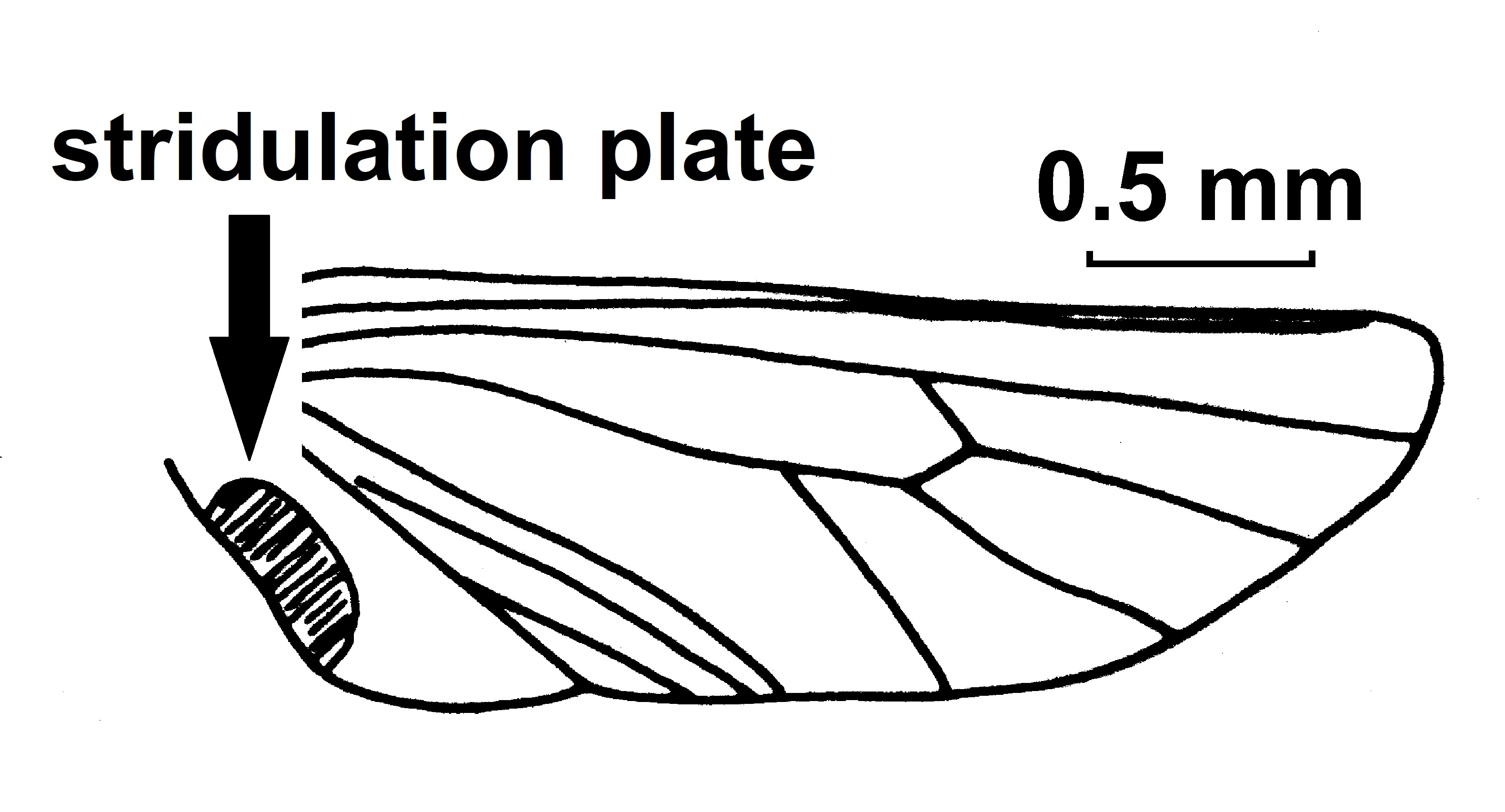
hind wing of Alara fumata (tribe Rhotanini) with stridulation plate

The forewings of Otiocerinae are typically elongated and often more than 2½ times longer than wide. The head is usually strongly compressed and extends in front of the eyes in the form of two thin plates or ridges. The vertex often has sensory pits and the antennae can be long and branched. In addition, there is a large variety of colours and wing patterns in this subfamily (see the gallery below).

== Classification ==
The higher classification of the Derbidae has changed repeatedly in the past. For example, Muir introduced the subfamily Otiocerinae in 1917 (together with the Derbinae, Cenchreinae and Rhotaninae), but in 1918 recognized only 2 subfamilies, the Zoraidinae and the Derbinae. In 1952, Fennah did not recognize any subfamilies and divided the Derbidae only into tribes. Currently (2024), 3 subfamilies are recognized and the genera of the Otiocerinae are assigned to the following 9 tribes:

- Tribe Aquaeliciini Banaszkiewicz & Szwedo, 2005
- Tribe Kamendakini Emeljanov 1995
- Tribe Neocyclokarini Emeljanov 1995
- Tribe Otiocerini Muir, 1913
- Tribe Patarini Emeljanov, 1995
- Tribe Phenicini Emeljanov 1995
- Tribe Rhotanini Muir, 1918
- Tribe Sikaianini Muir 1918
- Tribe Zoraidini Muir 1918
Diversity of forms and colours in the subfamily Otiocerinae

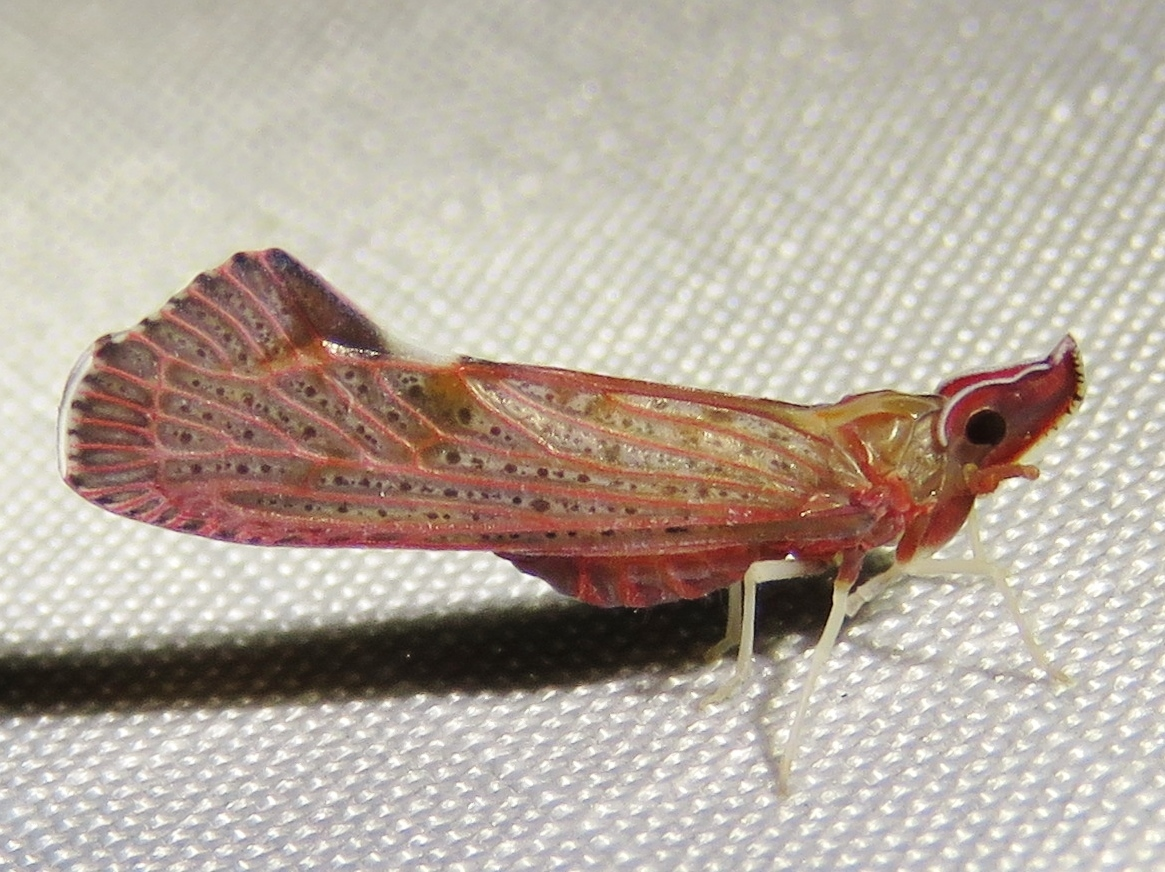
Apache degeeri (tribe Otiocerini)

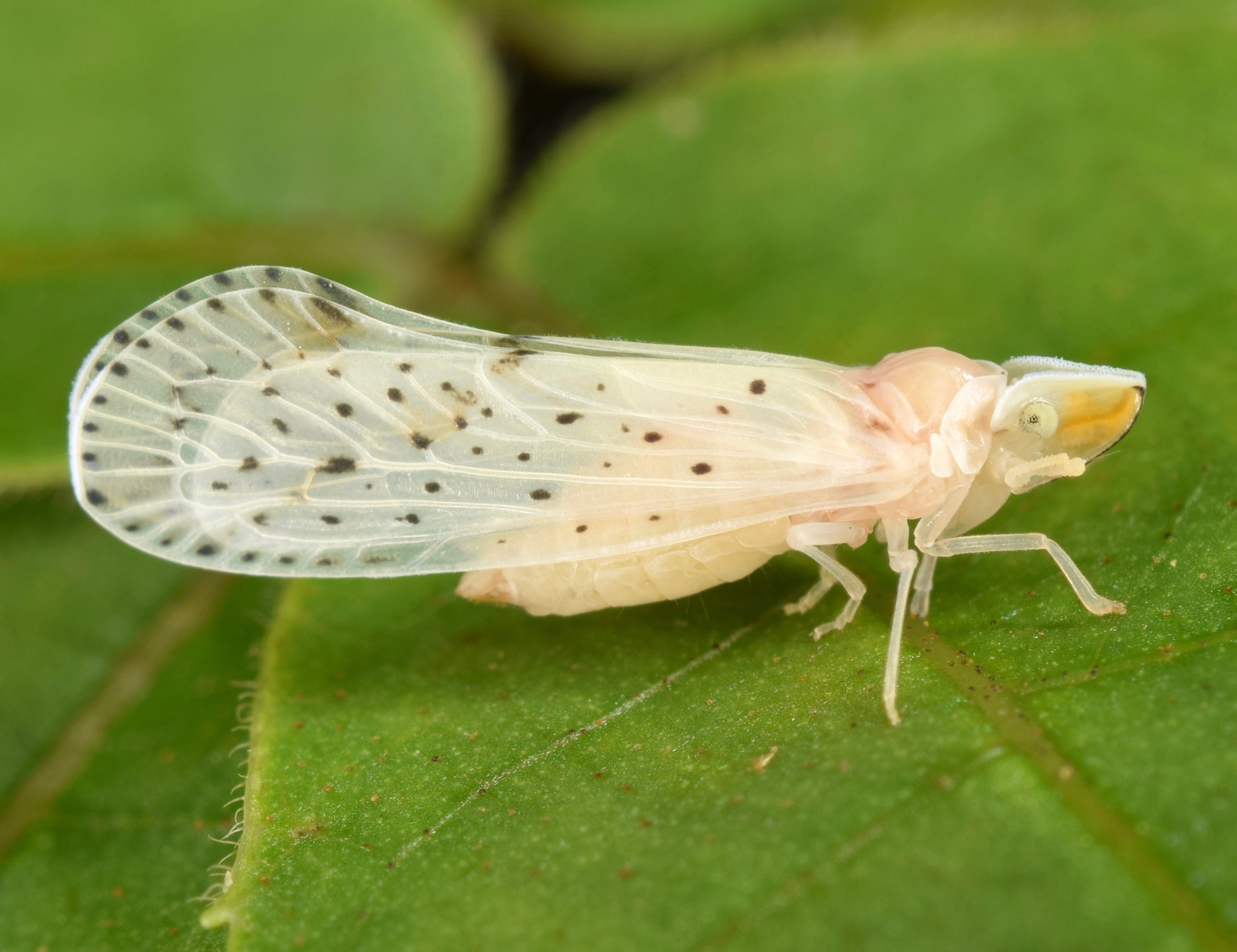
Otiocerus abbotii (tribe Otiocerini)

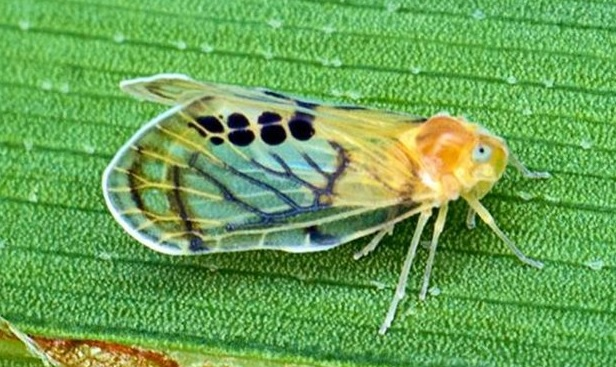
Rhotana gressittorum (tribe Rhotanini)

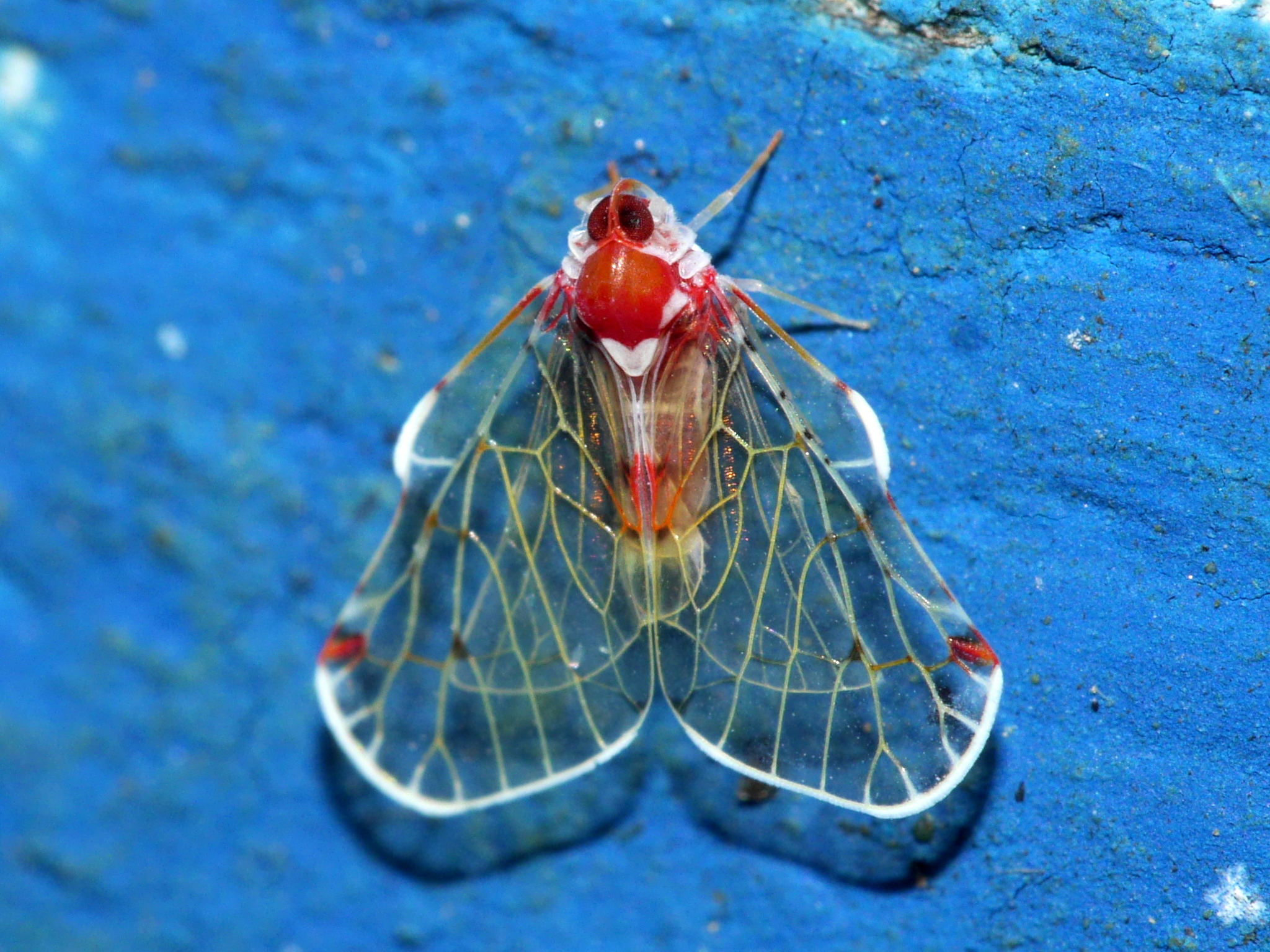
Saccharodite (tribe Rhotanini)

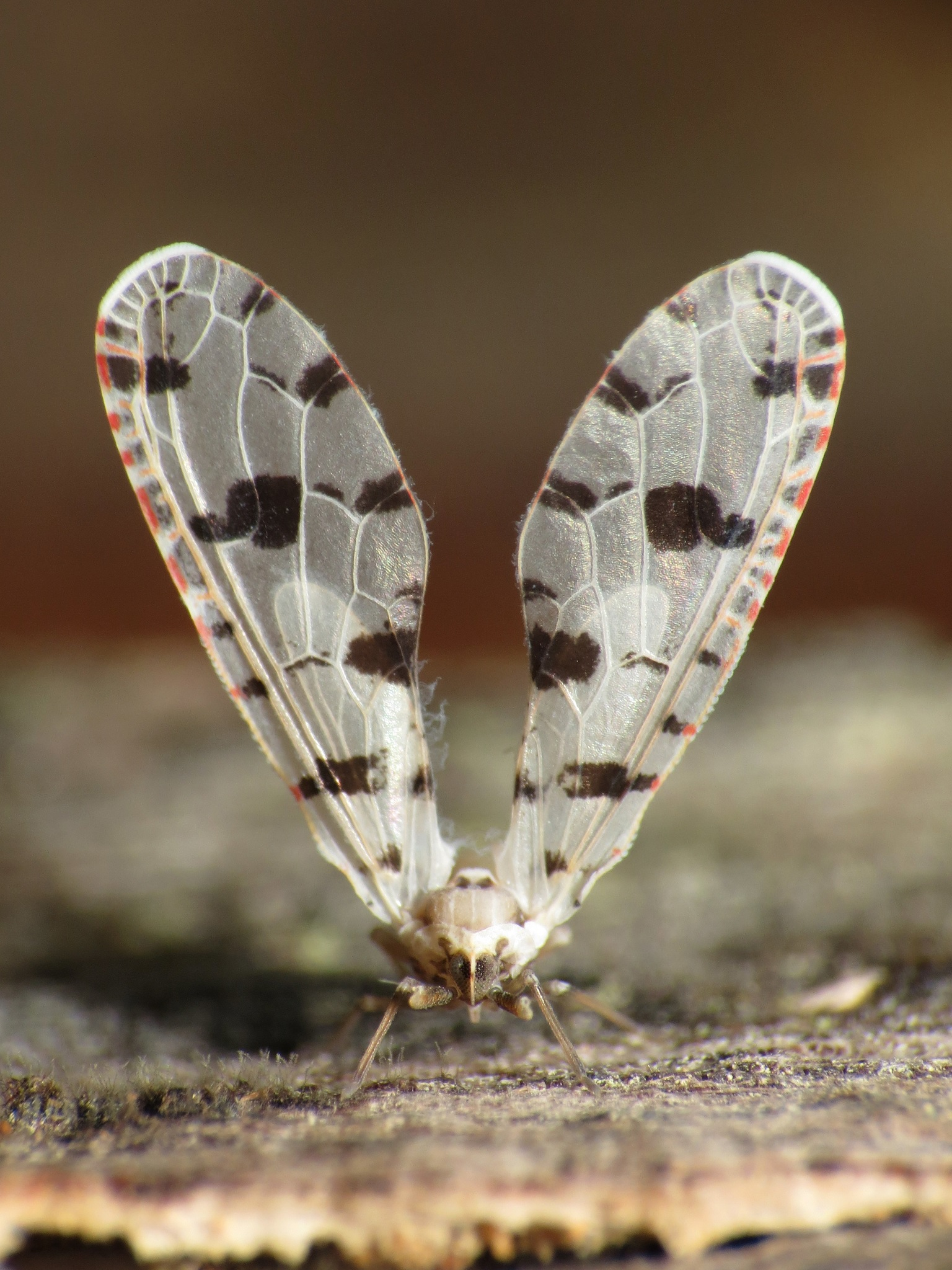
Sikaiana harti (tribe Sikaianini)

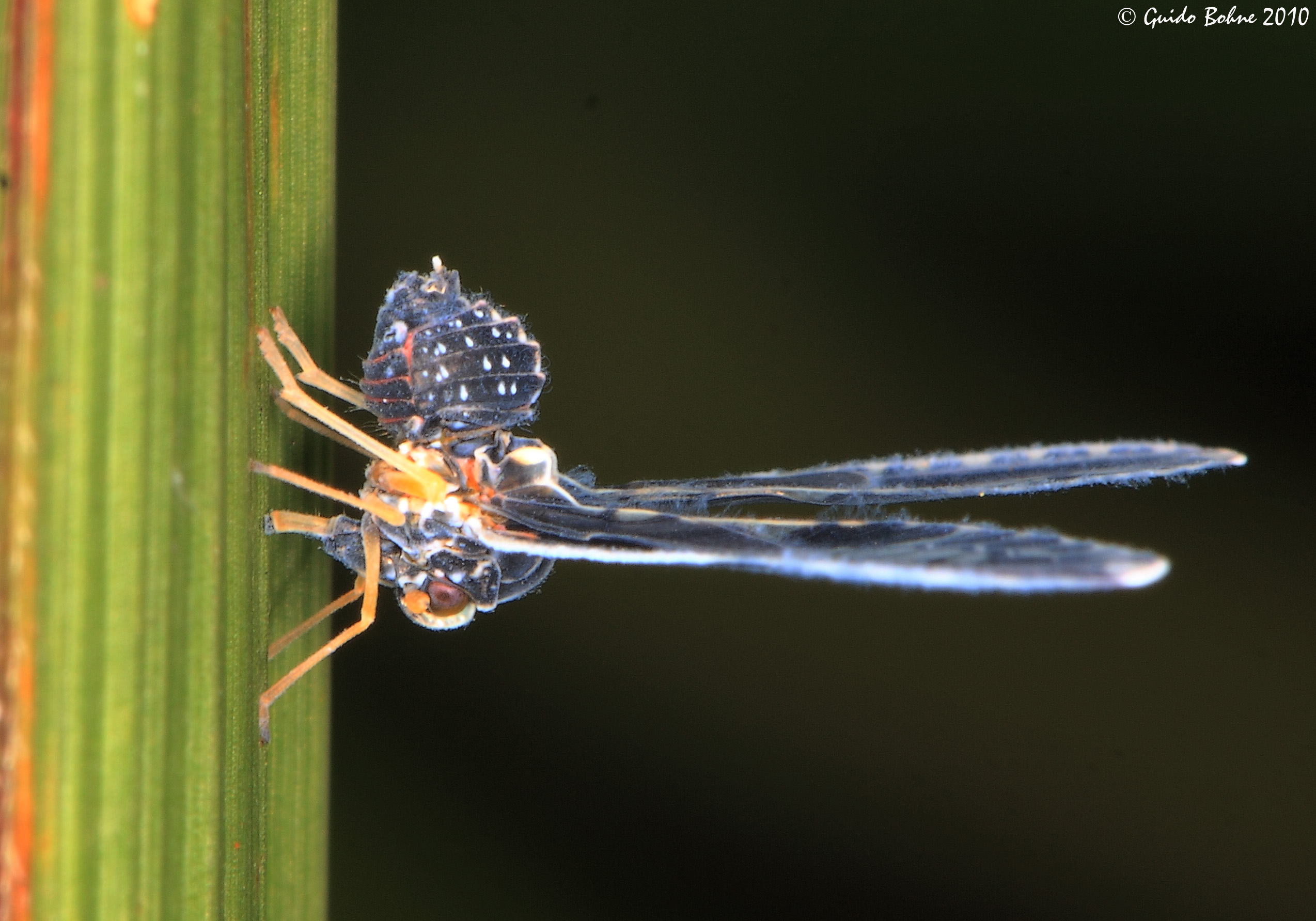
tribe Zoraidini
