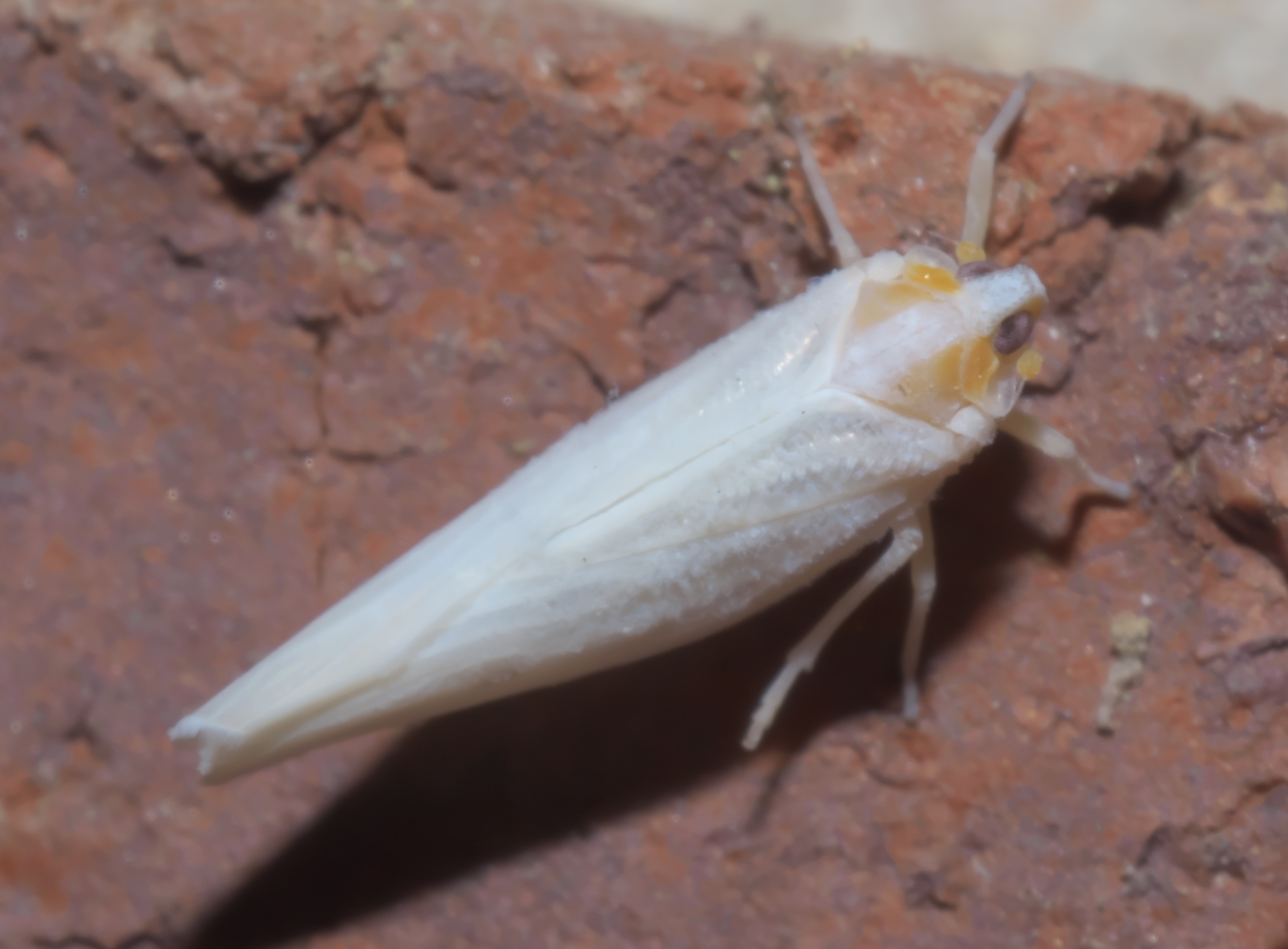

Scientific classification
- Domain: Eukaryota
- Kingdom: Animalia
- Phylum: Arthropoda
- Class: Insecta
- Order: Hemiptera
- Suborder: Auchenorrhyncha
- Infraorder: Fulgoromorpha
- Family: Derbidae
- Genus: Neocenchrea
- Species: N. heidemanni

Binomial name
- Neocenchrea heidemanni (Ball, 1902)

= Neocenchrea heidemanni =

Species of true bug

Neocenchrea heidemanni is a species of derbid planthopper in the family Derbidae.

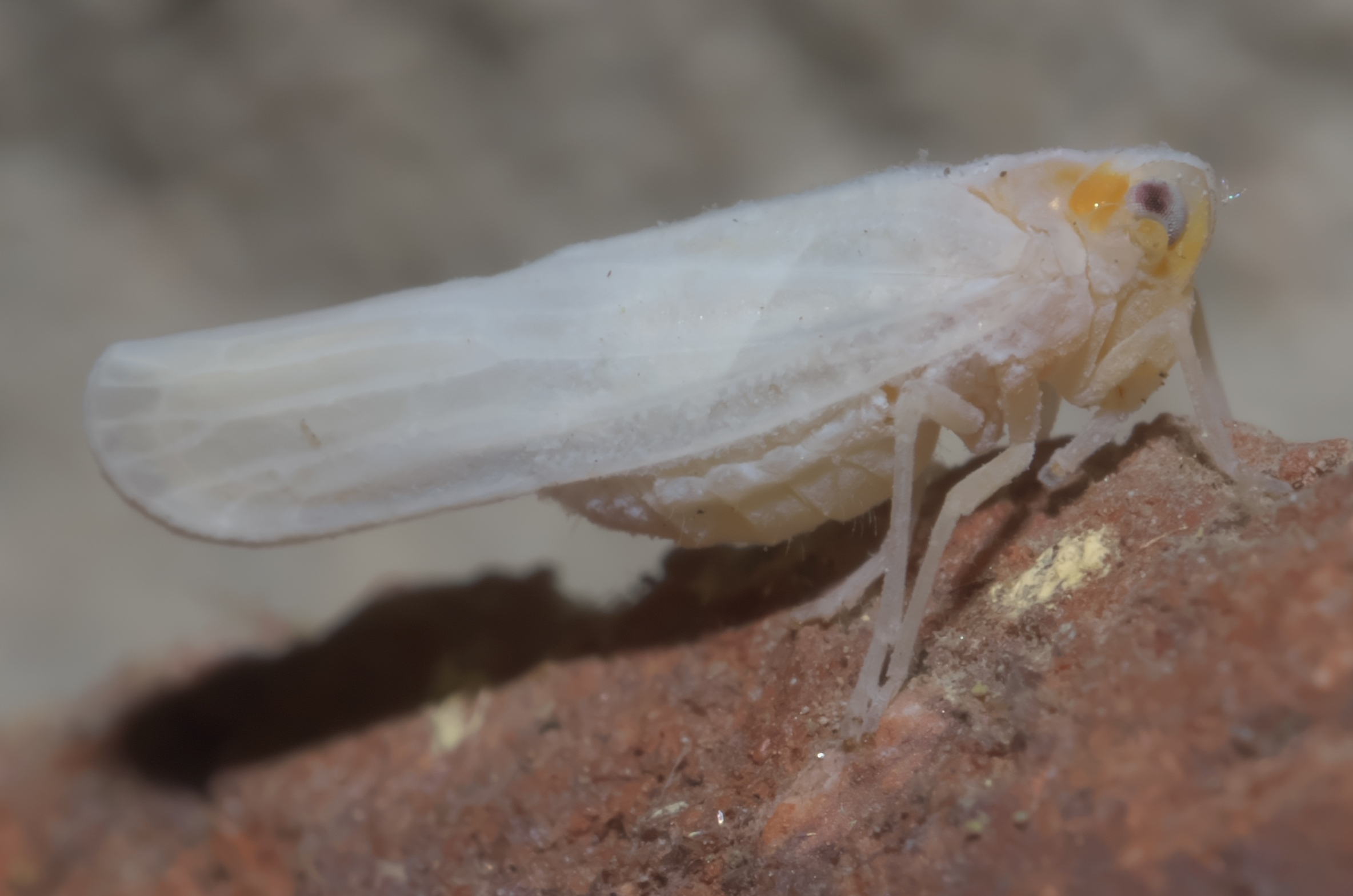
