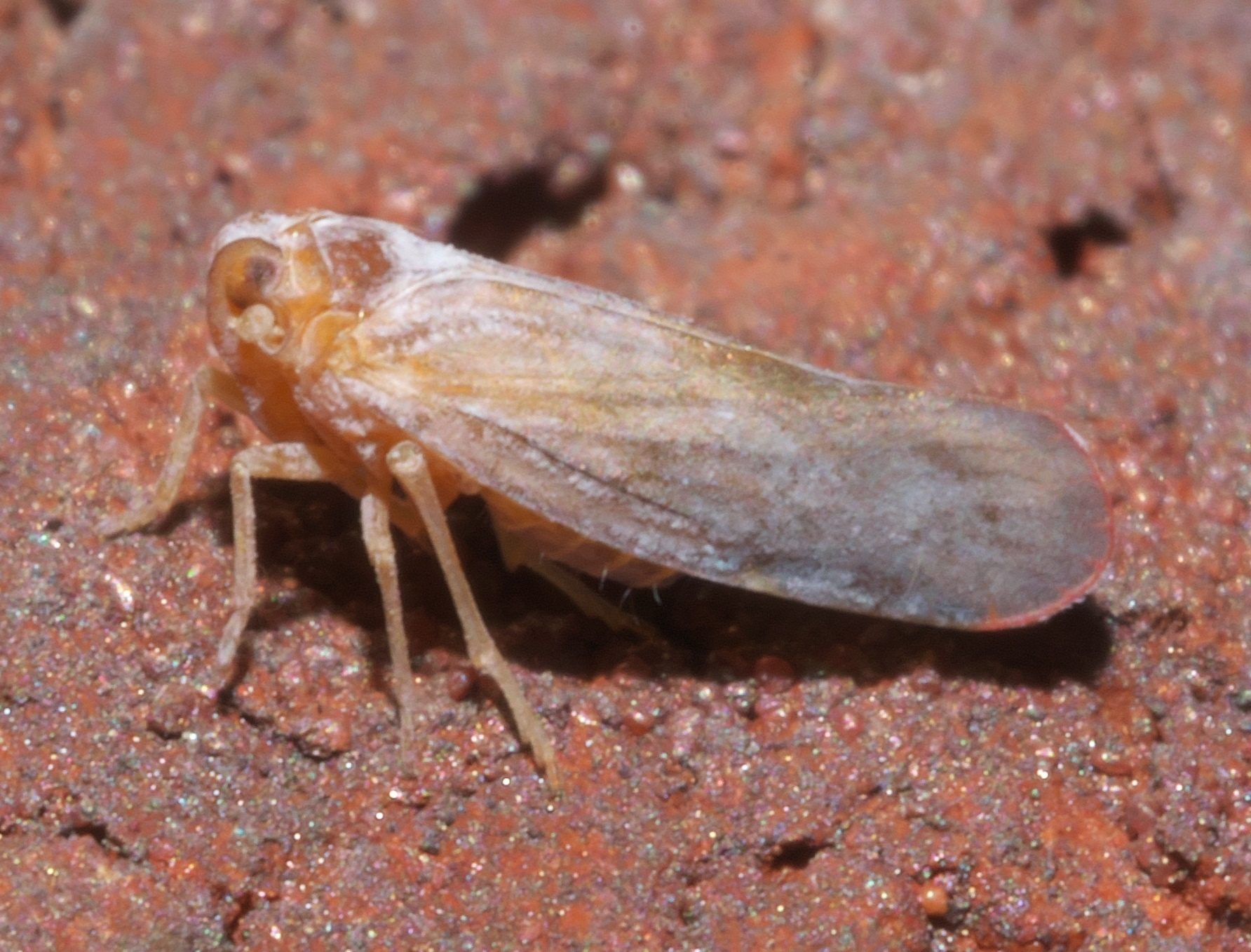
- Omolicna mcateei, Oklahoma

Scientific classification
- Domain: Eukaryota
- Kingdom: Animalia
- Phylum: Arthropoda
- Class: Insecta
- Order: Hemiptera
- Suborder: Auchenorrhyncha
- Infraorder: Fulgoromorpha
- Family: Derbidae
- Subfamily: Derbinae
- Tribe: Cenchreini
- Genus: Omolicna; Fennah, 1945

= Omolicna =

Genus of insects

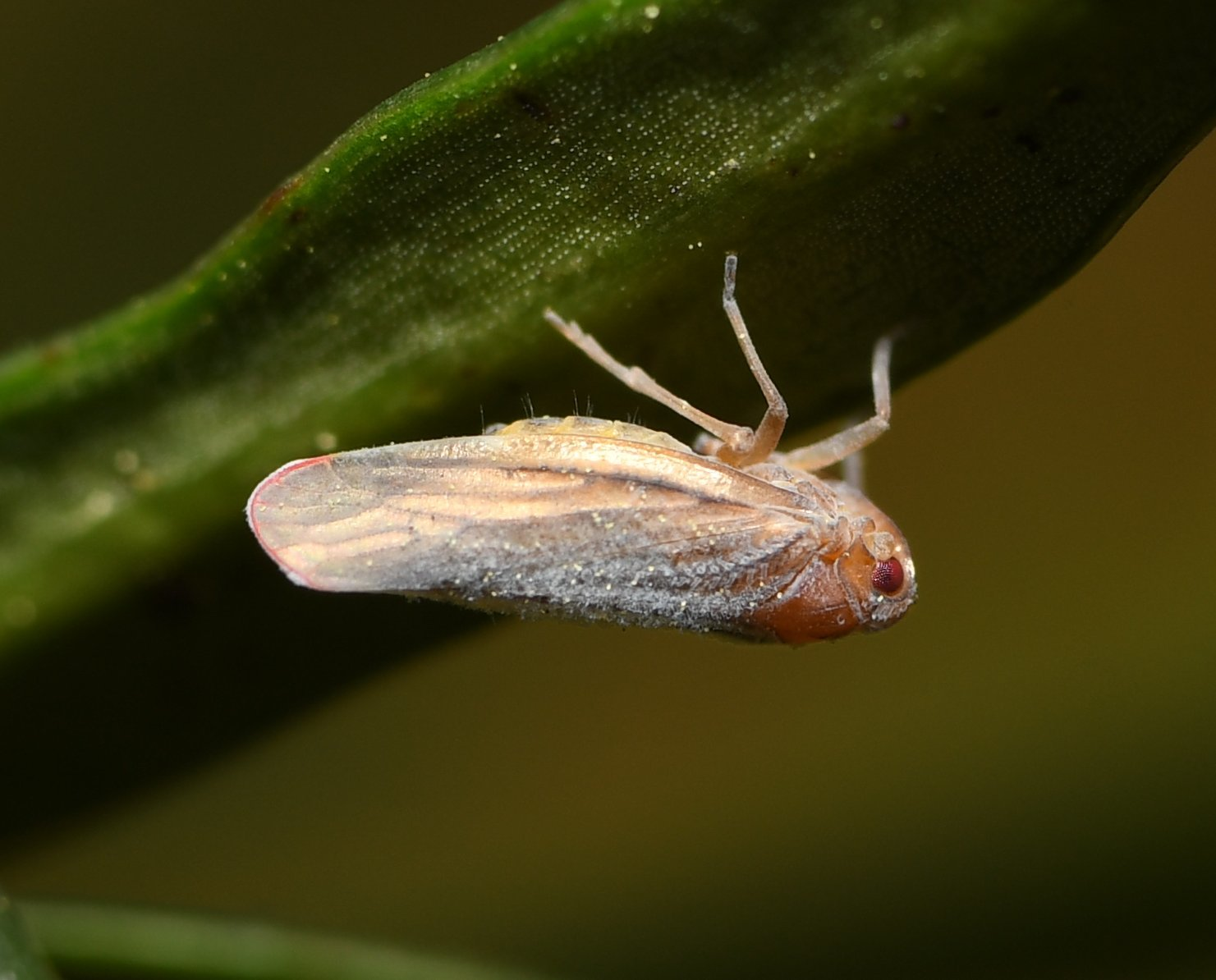
Omolicna uhleri, Florida

Omolicna is a genus of derbid planthoppers in the family Derbidae. There are more than 20 described species in Omolicna. They are found in North America, Central America, and northern South America.

== Species ==
These 22 species belong to the genus Omolicna:

- Omolicna anastomosis Caldwell, 1944
- Omolicna brunnea (Mc Atee, 1924)
- Omolicna cocoana Rodriguez-Leon & Hidalgo-Gato, 2005
- Omolicna cubana (Myers, 1926)
- Omolicna dominicana Fennah, 1952
- Omolicna dubia Caldwell, 1944
- Omolicna fulva (Van Duzee, 1909)
- Omolicna joi Wilson, Halbert & Bextine, 2014
- Omolicna latens Fennah, 1952
- Omolicna mariajosae Bahder & Bartlett, 2021
- Omolicna mcateei (Dozier, 1928)
- Omolicna nero Fennah, 1971
- Omolicna nigripennis Caldwell, 1944
- Omolicna proxima Fennah, 1945
- Omolicna puertana Caldwell, 1951
- Omolicna puncta Caldwell, 1944
- Omolicna quadrispinosa Caldwell, 1944
- Omolicna rubrimarginata Fennah, 1945
- Omolicna tarco Fennah, 1971
- Omolicna texana Caldwell, 1944
- Omolicna triata Caldwell, 1944
- Omolicna uhleri (Ball, 1902)
