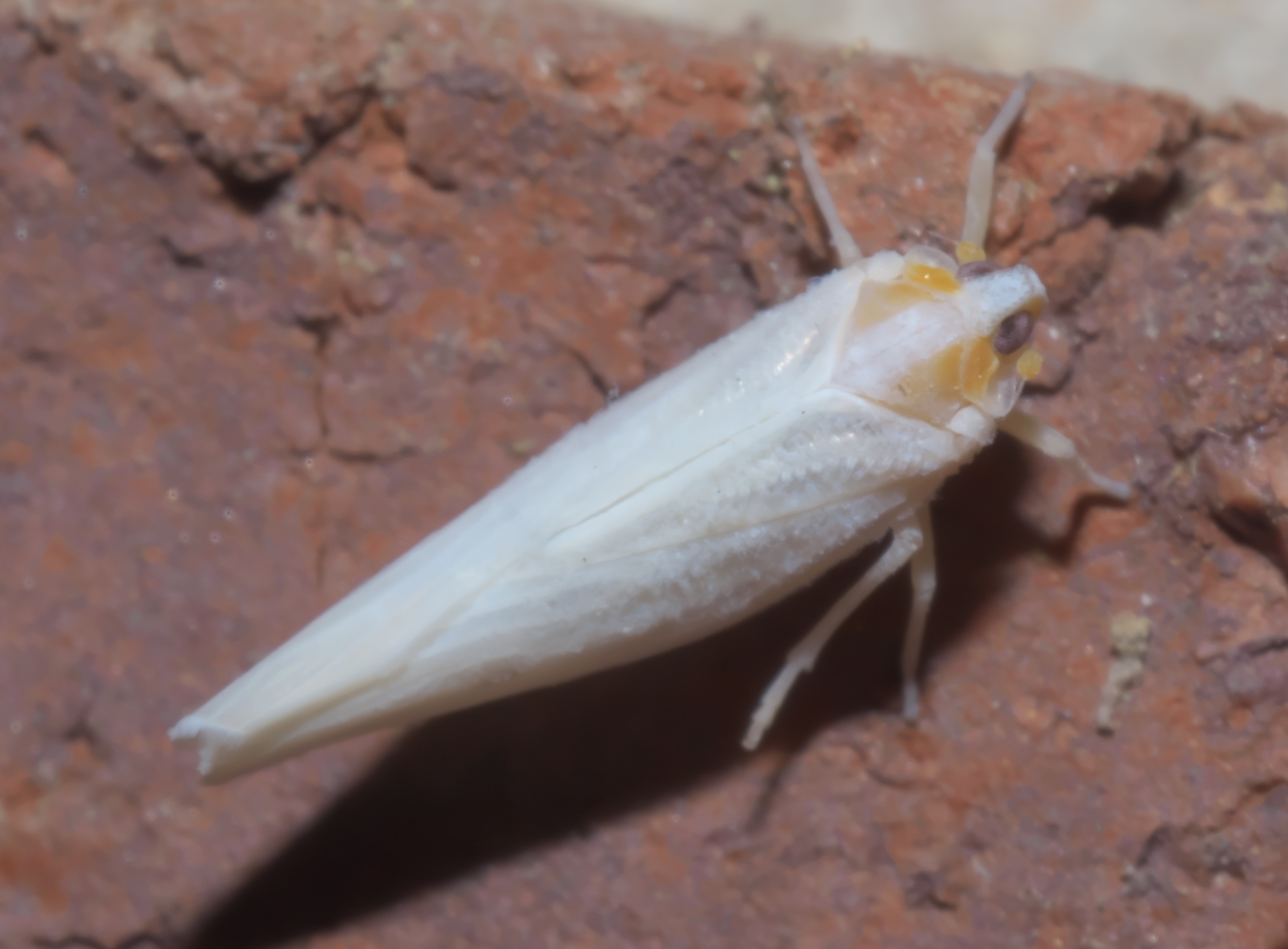
- Neocenchrea heidemanni

Scientific classification
- Domain: Eukaryota
- Kingdom: Animalia
- Phylum: Arthropoda
- Class: Insecta
- Order: Hemiptera
- Suborder: Auchenorrhyncha
- Infraorder: Fulgoromorpha
- Family: Derbidae
- Tribe: Cenchreini
- Genus: Neocenchrea; Metcalf, 1923

= Neocenchrea =

Genus of true bugs

Neocenchrea is a genus of derbid planthoppers in the family Derbidae. There are about five described species in Neocenchrea.

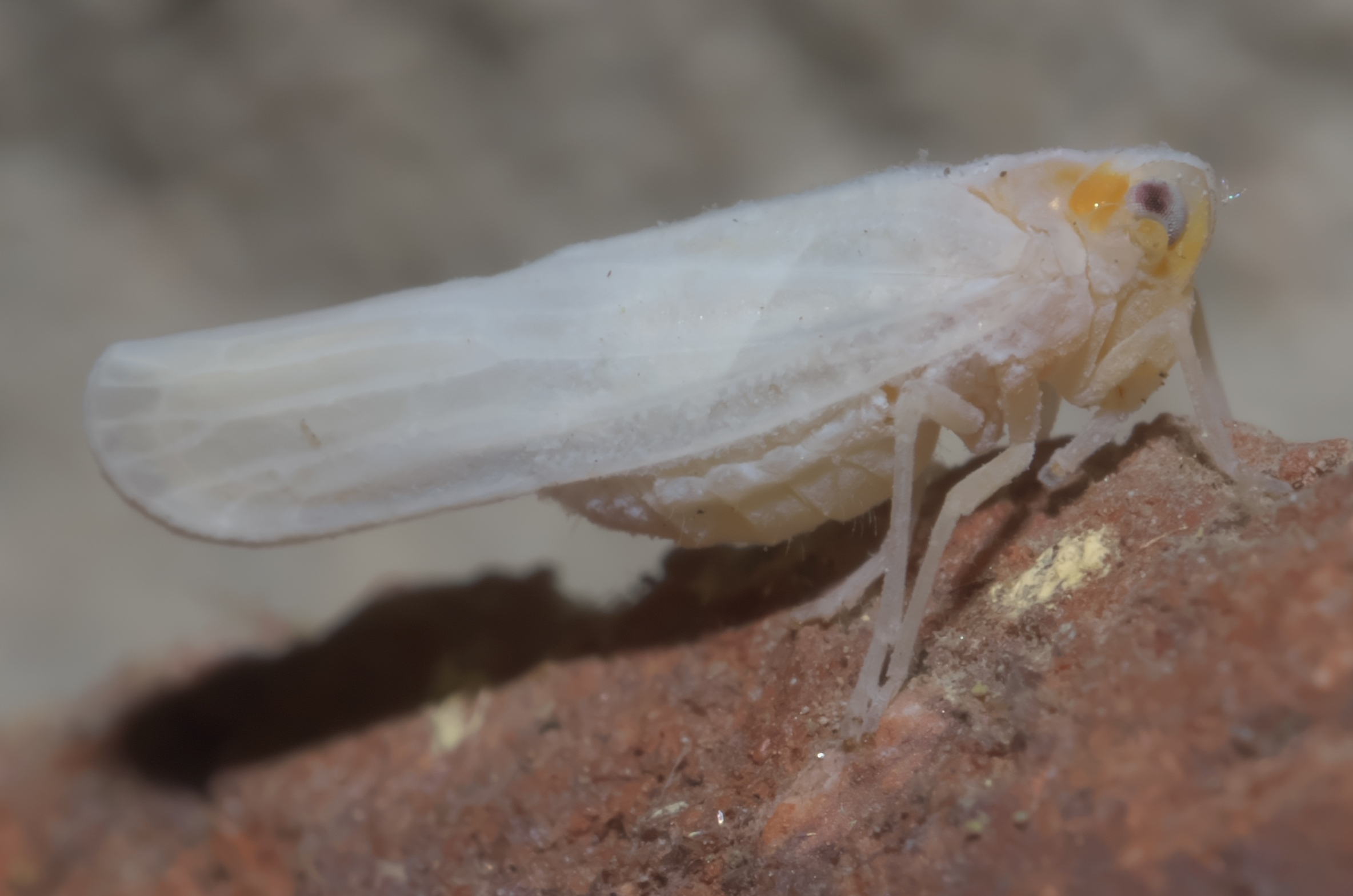
Neocenchrea heidemanni

== Species ==
These five species belong to the genus Neocenchrea:

- Neocenchrea bakeri (Mc Atee, 1924)^{c g}
- Neocenchrea heidemanni (Ball, 1902)^{c g b}
- Neocenchrea mero Fennah, 1952^{c g}
- Neocenchrea ochracea Metcalf, 1945^{c g}
- Neocenchrea pallida Metcalf, 1938^{c g}

Data sources: i = ITIS, c = Catalogue of Life, g = GBIF, b = Bugguide.net
