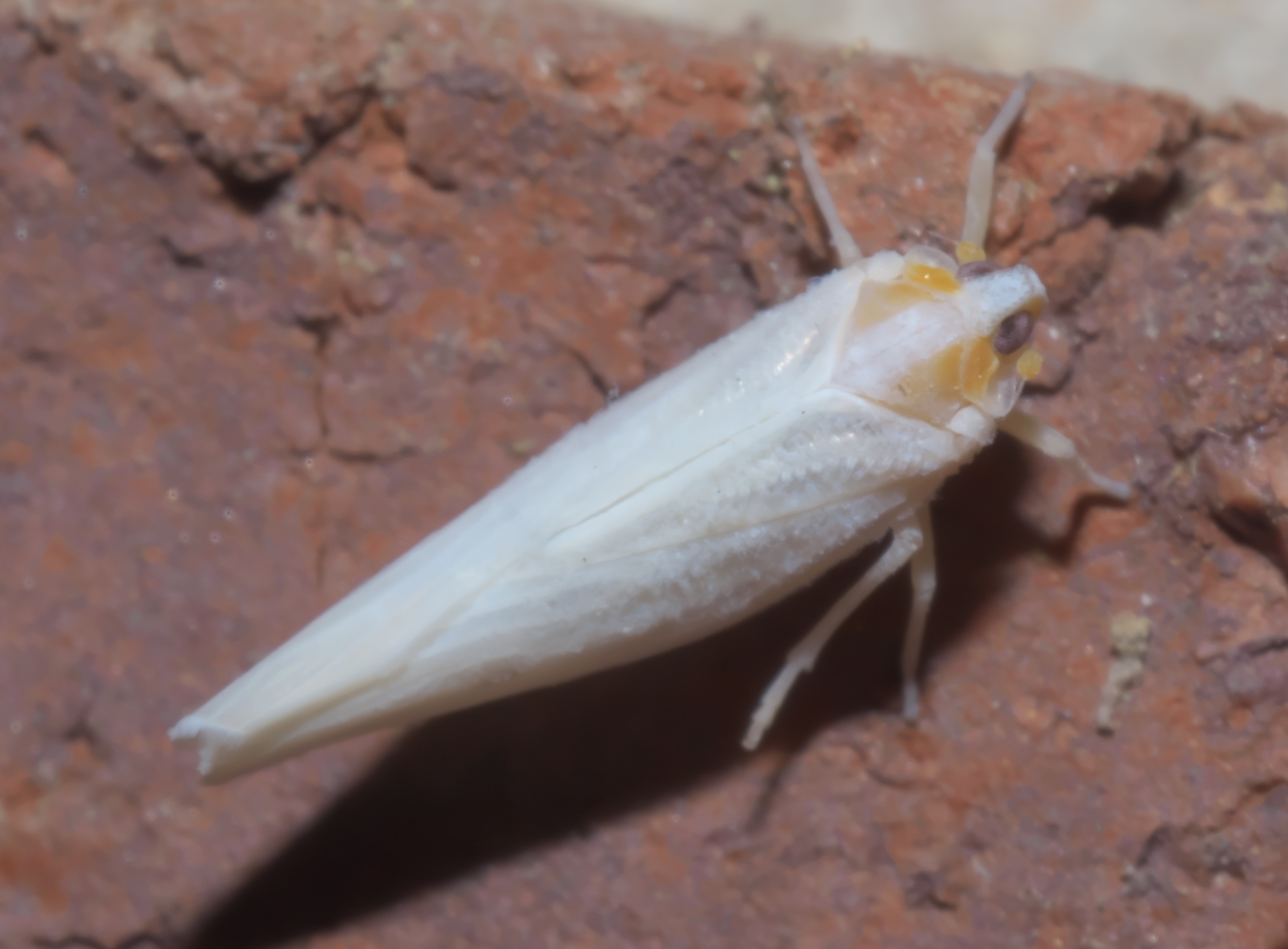
- Neocenchrea heidemanni

Scientific classification
- Kingdom: Animalia
- Phylum: Arthropoda
- Class: Insecta
- Order: Hemiptera
- Suborder: Auchenorrhyncha
- Infraorder: Fulgoromorpha
- Family: Derbidae
- Subfamily: Derbinae
- Tribe: Cenchreini; Muir, 1917

= Cenchreini =

Tribe of true bugs

Cenchreini is a tribe of derbid planthoppers in the family Derbidae. There are at least 30 genera in Cenchreini.

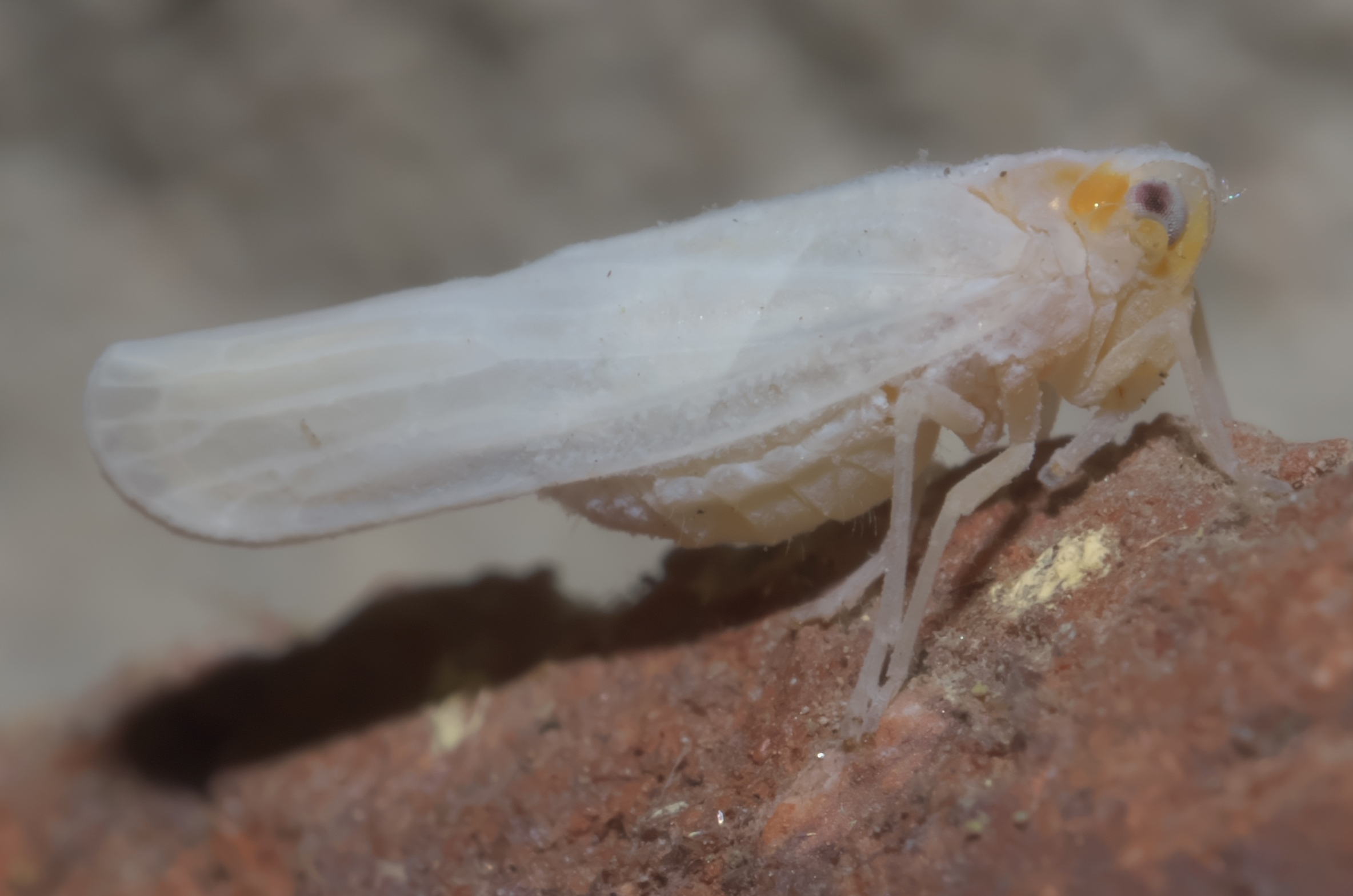
Neocenchrea heidemanni

== Genera ==
These 33 genera belong to the tribe Cenchreini:

- Anchimothon Fennah, 1952^{c g}
- Aquaelicium Distant, 1917^{c g}
- Basileocephalus Kirkaldy, 1906^{c g}
- Cenanges Fennah, 1952^{c g}
- Cenchrea Westwood, 1840^{c g}
- Contigucephalus Caldwell, 1944^{c g}
- Cyclometopum Muir, 1913^{c g}
- Dawnaria Distant, 1911^{c g}
- Dawnarioides Dozier, 1929^{c g}
- Dysimia Muir, 1924^{c g b}
- Equirria Distant, 1917^{c g}
- Fescennia Stål, 1886^{c}
- Fordicidia Distant, 1917^{c g}
- Goneokara Muir, 1913^{c g}
- Herpis Stål, 1860^{c g}
- Lamenia Stål, 1859^{i c g}
- Malenia Haupt, 1924^{c g}
- Muirileguatia Metcalf, 1945^{c g}
- Neocenchrea Metcalf, 1923^{c g b}
- Neocyclokara Muir, 1917^{c g}
- Neolamenia Muir, 1917^{c g}
- Omolicna Fennah, 1945^{c g b}
- Oropuna Fennah, 1952^{c g}
- Paraphenice Muir, 1924^{c g}
- Patara Westwood, 1840^{c g b}
- Perandenina Distant, 1911^{c g}
- Persis Stål, 1860^{c g b}
- Phaciocephalus Kirkaldy, 1906^{c g}
- Phenice Westwood, 1840^{c g}
- Symidia Muir, 1918^{c g}
- Syntames Fowler, 1905^{g}
- Vekunta Distant, 1906^{c g}
- Vinata Distant, 1906^{c g}

Data sources: i = ITIS, c = Catalogue of Life, g = GBIF, b = Bugguide.net
