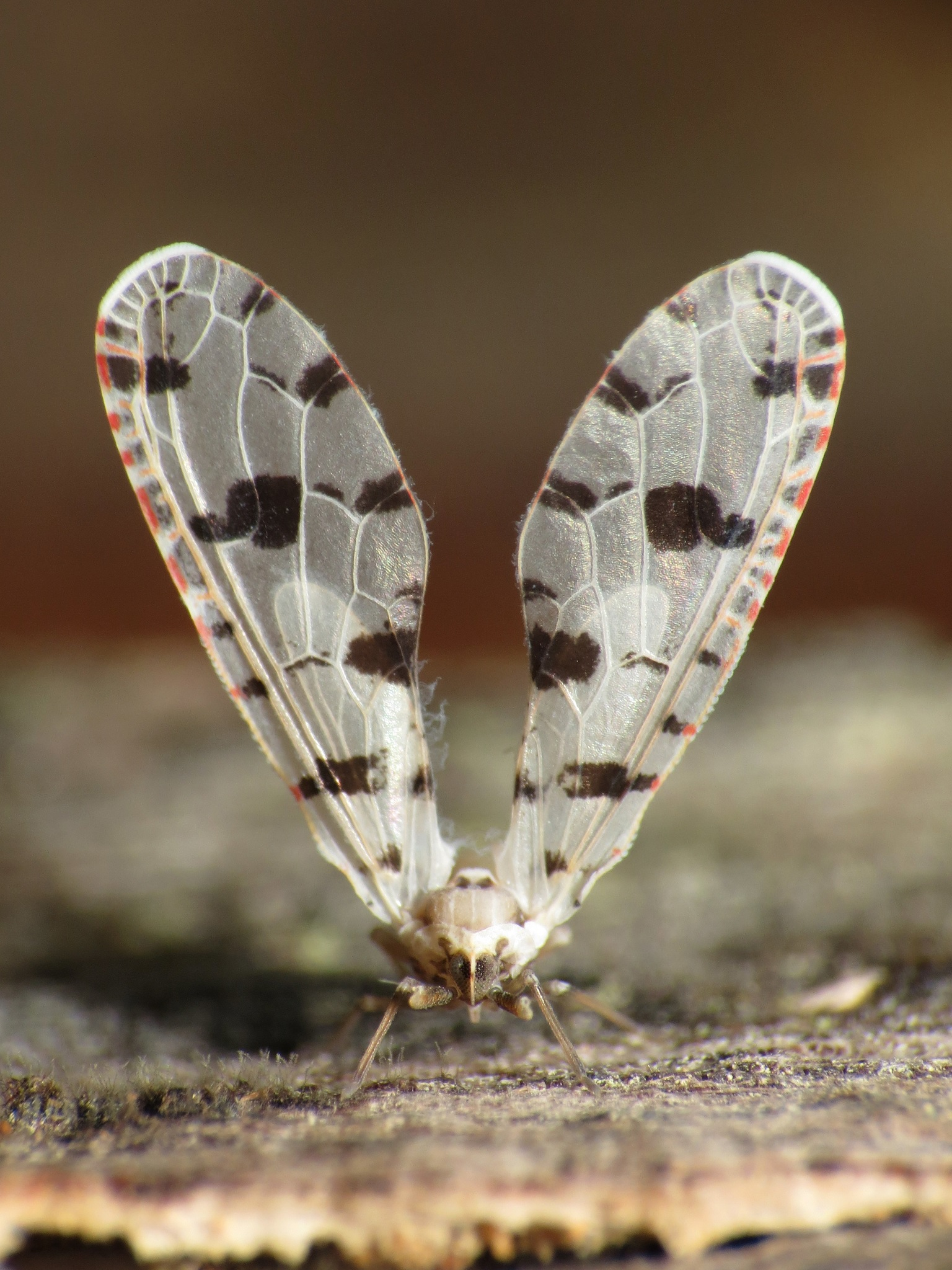
- Sikaiana harti

Scientific classification
- Kingdom: Animalia
- Phylum: Arthropoda
- Clade: Pancrustacea
- Class: Insecta
- Order: Hemiptera
- Suborder: Auchenorrhyncha
- Infraorder: Fulgoromorpha
- Family: Derbidae
- Subfamily: Otiocerinae
- Tribe: Sikaianini; Muir, 1917

= Sikaianini =

Tribe of true bugs

The Sikaianini is a small group (tribe) of planthoppers in the family Derbidae with a total of 6 genera and 34 species, as of 2025. They are mainly found in tropical regions around the world. Most species have been described from islands in southeastern Asia (the Philippines, eastern Indonesia, Palau and Taiwan), from northeastern Australia, and from the southwestern Pacific (Fiji, Samoa, the Solomon Islands and New Caledonia). Additional species are known from mainland Asia (Vietnam) and the Seychelles (one each), from West Africa (two), from North America (two) and one from the Caribbean. The members of the Sikaianini are small and delicate insects with a body length of around 2 mm and a typical forewing length of 4–6 mm. They frequently have a light coloration, and translucent forewings with some darker marks. They can be distinguished from the other tribes of the Derbidae by the shape of the eyes which reach the clypeus in front, the forewing venation and the short hind wings which sometimes seem to be used for stridulation only. The adult hoppers have been found feeding on different types of palm trees.

Type species: Sikaiana hyalinata Distant, 1907

== Distribution ==
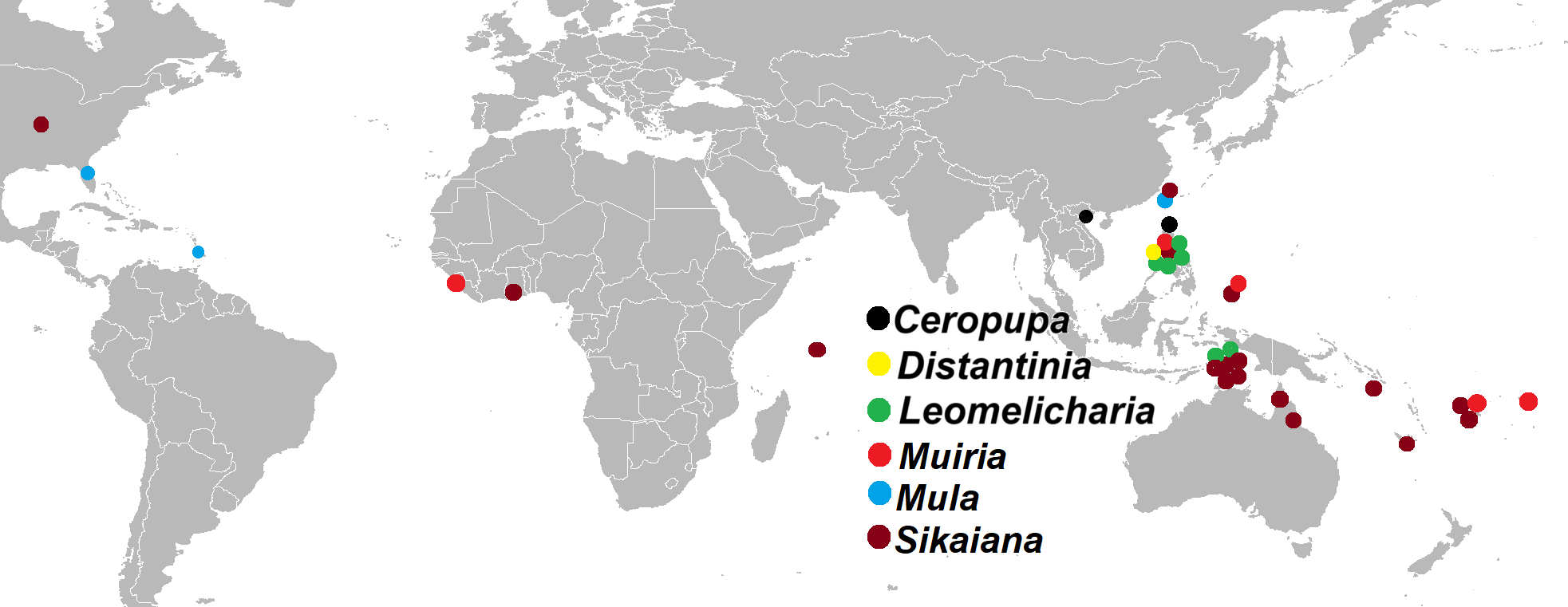
Distribution of the type localities of 34 species in the six genera of the tribe Sikaianini (click on image to enlarge it)

The members of the tribe Sikaianini are found in widely scattered areas around the world, mainly in tropical regions. The genus Sikaiana includes 17 species and was originally described from two species that live in Queensland, northeastern Australia. Twelve other species from the same genus have been also described from neighboring parts of South East Asia and the western Pacific. These include five species from Larat Island in southeastern Indonesia, four from islands in the southwestern Pacific (Solomon Islands, New Caledonia and Fiji), and one each from Palau Islands, Luzon Island (Philippines) and from Taiwan. Three other species of Sikaiana are found in the Seychelles (Indian Ocean), Ghana (West Africa) and eastern North America.

The other five genera in this tribe contain few species. The genus Muiria includes five species, described from the Pacific islands of Fiji, Samoa and Palau, one from the Philippines and one from Sierra Leone in West Africa. The genus Leomelicharia includes six species which have been only reported from Luzon Isl. (Mount Makiling) in the Philippines and from Larat Isl. in eastern Indonesia. The genus Distantinia only contains a single species from Luzon Isl. in the Philippines. The genus Mula includes 3 species, described from Florida (U.S.A.), St. Lucia (Caribbean) and Taiwan. Finally, the genus Ceropupa includes 2 species from Vietnam and from the northern Philippines. The Sikaianini have not been encountered very often, but seem to be common in some locations, apparently when the environmental conditions are suitable.

== Description ==
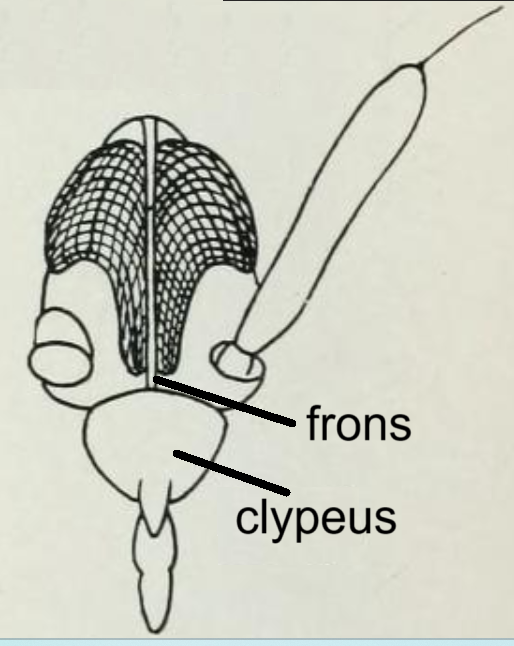
Head in frontal view of Sikaiana harti showing the long antenna and the eyes almost reaching the clypeus (original drawing by Metcalf)

The tribe Sikaianini is characterized by a combination of different features. The most important one is the shape of the eyes which are extended in front and reach, or almost reach the base of the clypeus when the head is seen in frontal view. In identification keys, the Sikaianini are usually associated with the tribe Zoraidini. Both tribes can be distinguished from other Derbidae by their short hind wings which are less than half as long as the forewings and in some species are minute and seem to be used for stridulation only.

The species of Sikaianini are among the smallest in the family Derbidae. The size of the body from the head to the end of the abdomen is between 1½ and 2½ mm. The length of the forewings is usually 4 to 5 mm, rarely 6 mm, and the total length of the insects from head to the end of the forewings is typically 5 to 6 mm. Other features include antennae as long as or longer than the face (frons) and without appendages. There are no cup-like structures behind the antennae which are found in other groups of Derbidae. The face or frons, the front part of the head between the eyes, is very narrow and compressed. In side view, the head is slightly extended in front of the eyes, but less than in some other groups of derbids and not more than the diameter of the eye. The body might have a light coloration, but several species are mostly brown, red or have some red or brownish marks. The forewings are translucent, sometimes also glassy. They often have dark markings as well as some red or white spots, especially along the costal margin. In live insects, the wings are usually raised in a vertical position above the body.

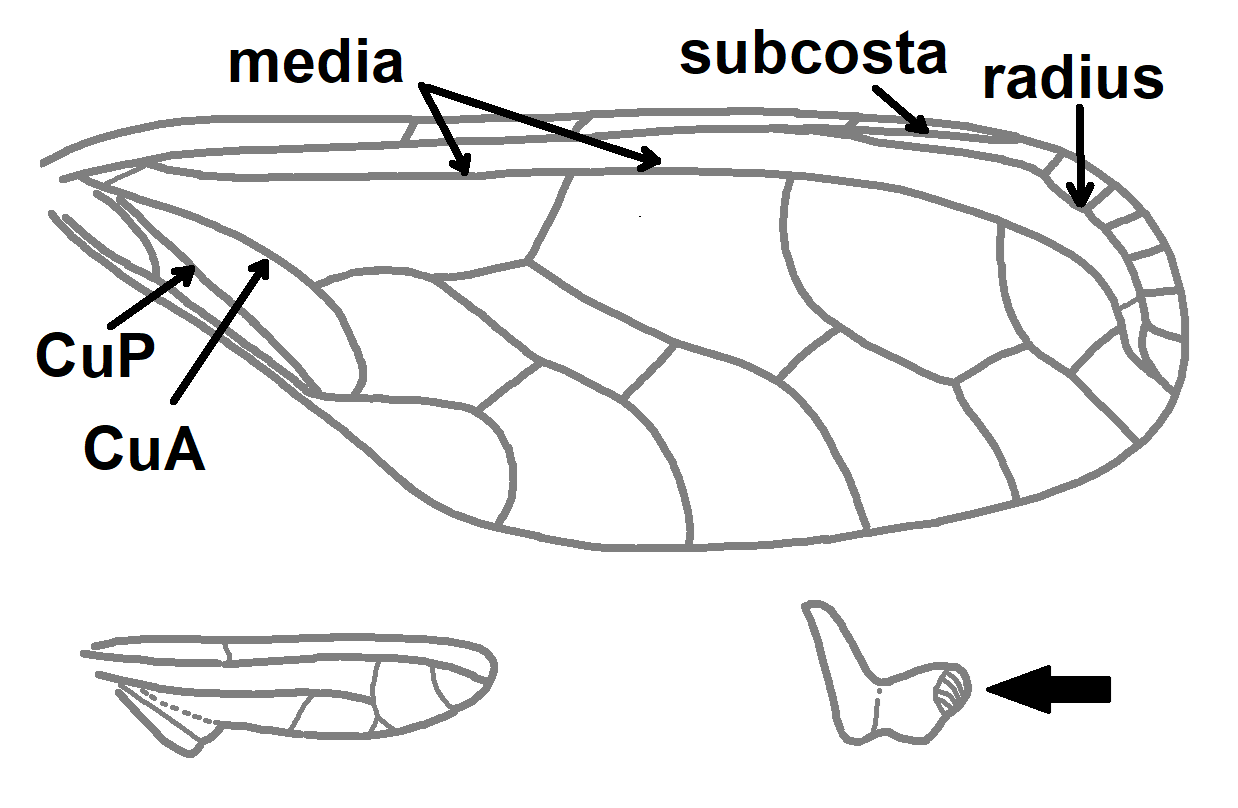
Wing shape and venation in Sikaianini – upper part: forewing of Sikaiana lycotas with some veins named (CuP = posterior cubitus, CuA = anterior cubitus), bottom left: hind wing of Sikaiana lycotas, bottom right: hind wing of Muiria stridula with stridulation area marked by arrow

In the Sikaianini, the venation of the forewings is highly unusual compared to other groups in the family Derbidae. The subcosta and radius veins are fused for most of their length, if not completely. The radius has a series of short branches and cells around the tip of the forewing and its end often joins the end of the media vein. The cells associated with the media and cubitus veins are unusually large and the media has few branches.

== Biology ==
There is no information on the biology of the nymphal stages of the species in the tribe Sikaianini. However, it can be assumed that they live in decaying organic matter like other derbids, feeding on fungi. The adult hoppers have been most often collected from different types of palm trees. In some cases, these have been specified and include for example cabbage palms (Sabal palmetto), Pinanga urosperma, Phoenicophorium borsigianum and palms of the genus Thrinax. However, other host plants like Heliconia have been also reported.

== Taxonomy and genera ==
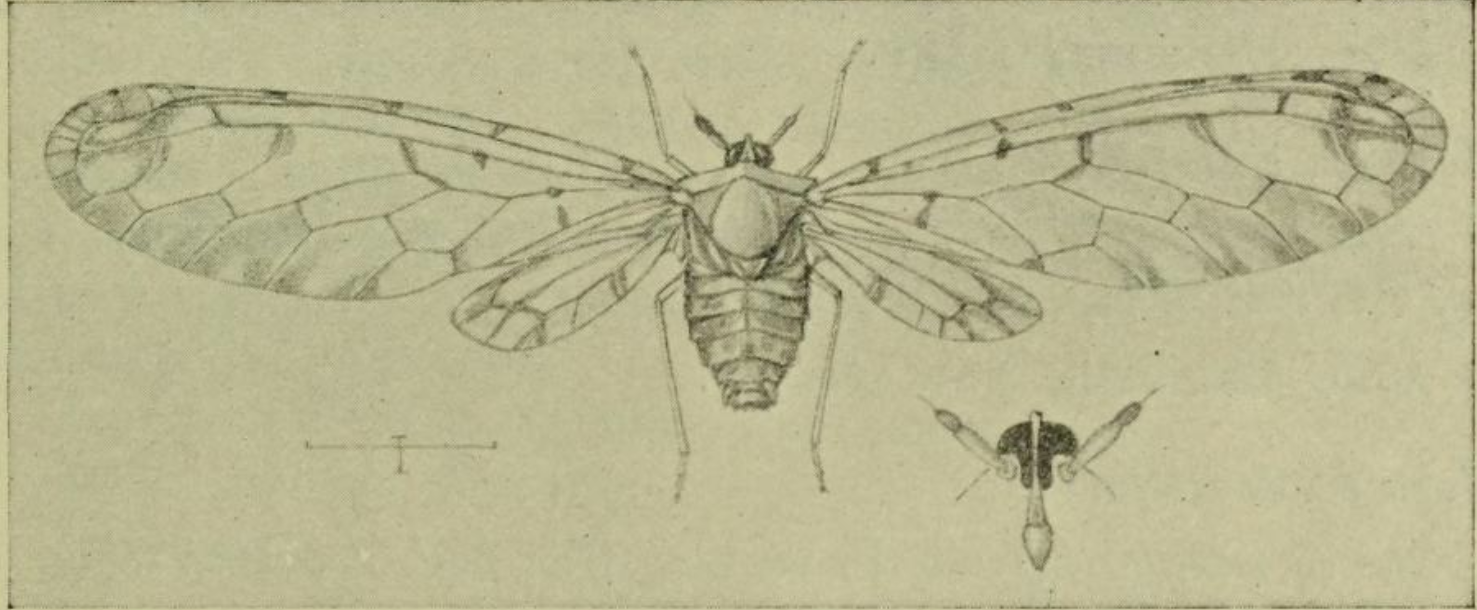
Original drawing by Distant of Sikaiana hyalinata, the type species of Sikaiana

The tribe Sikaianini is based on the genus Sikaiana, described by Distant in 1907. Distant did not indicate where the name originated from. The name "Sikaianini" for the tribe was first used by Muir in 1917. However, in 1913 he already described a "subgroup" of species and genera associated with the genus Sikaiana (actually misspelled as Sikiana) which shows similarities with the Zoraida group. Muir listed 4 genera in the tribe Sikaianini: Sikaiana, Muiria, Leomelicharia and Distantinia. Two additional genera, Mula and Ceropupa were added to this tribe subsequently. The genera Iguvium Distant 1917 from the Seychelles and Euklastus Metcalf 1923 from North America are also associated with this tribe. However, they are now both regarded as synonyms of Sikaiana.

=== Genus Ceropupa Emeljanov 1995 ===
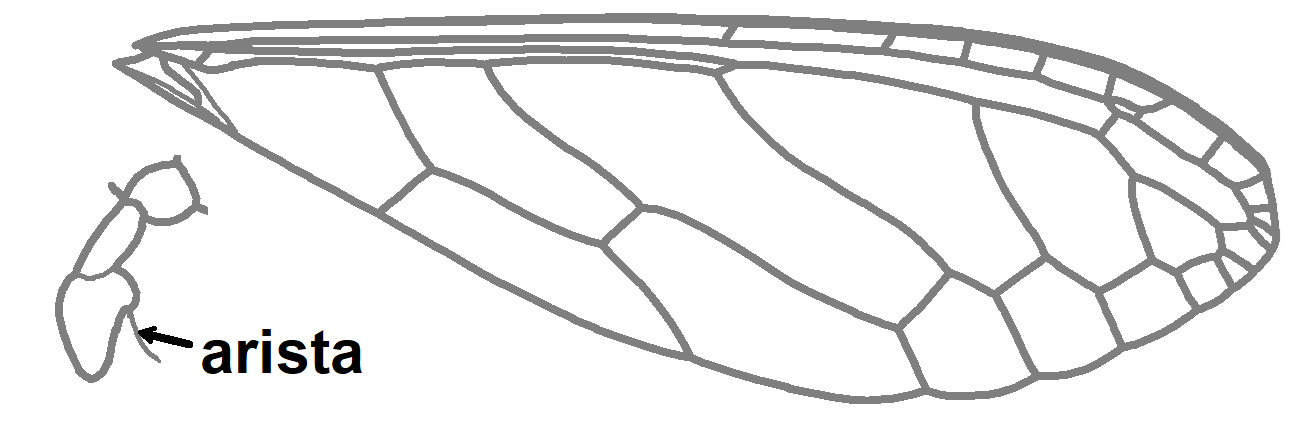
Forewing venation of Ceropupa trismegista - Lower left: antenna with arista marked

Type species: Ceropupa trismegista. Two species have been described in the genus Ceropupa, both have a predominantly dark brown coloration. The genus is similar to the genus Leomelicharia Muir (see below), especially the forewing venation. The hind wings are very small like in the genus Muiria. The original description of Ceropupa also emphasizes the unusual structure of the antennae with the second antennal segment being divided into two parts by a constriction. The first, basal, part is spindle-shaped and the second, terminal part is much broader and kidney-shaped. The terminal part is particularly broad at its base where the antennal bristle (the arista) is inserted. The description of the antennae of the genus Leomelicharia is similar: “antennae large, slightly flattened, constricted about middle, indented at side of apex where the arista arises”.

=== Genus Distantinia Muir 1917 ===
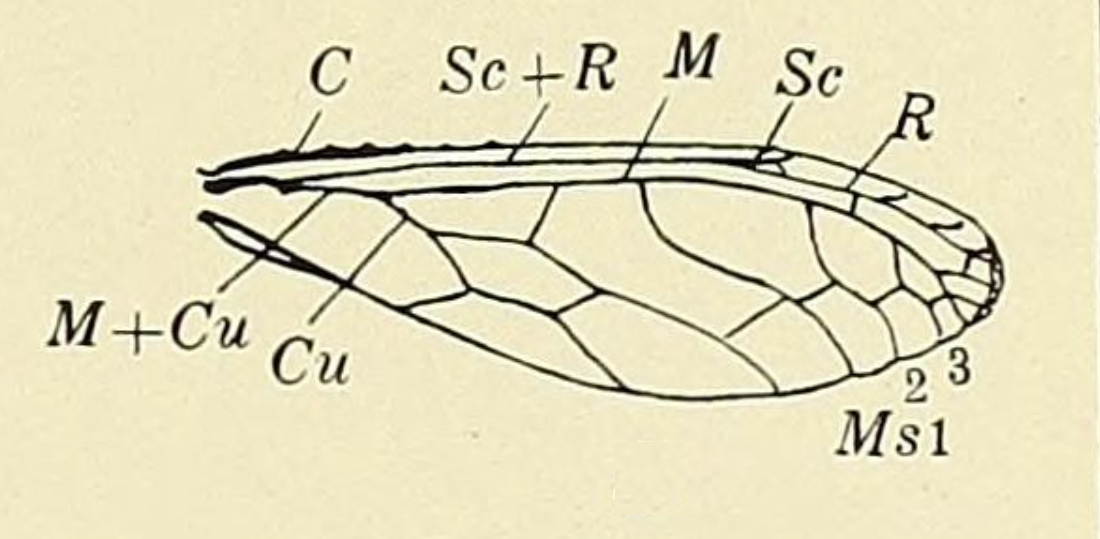
Original drawing by Muir of the forewing of Distantinia nigroacuminis with the forewing veins labelled as follows: C = costa, Sc+R = fused subcosta and radius, M = media, Sc = subcosta, R = radius, M+Cu = fused media and cubitus, Cu = cubitus, Ms = media sectors (branches)

Type species: Distantinia nigrocacuminis. The main distinguishing feature of Distantinia is the forewing having the bases of the media and cubitus veins fused, see Muir's illustration on the right. Distantinia nigrocacuminis, the sole species of Distantinia, has been only reported once from Luzon Island in the Philippines. It has a brown coloration and minute, triangular hind wings.

=== Genus Leomelicharia Muir 1913 ===
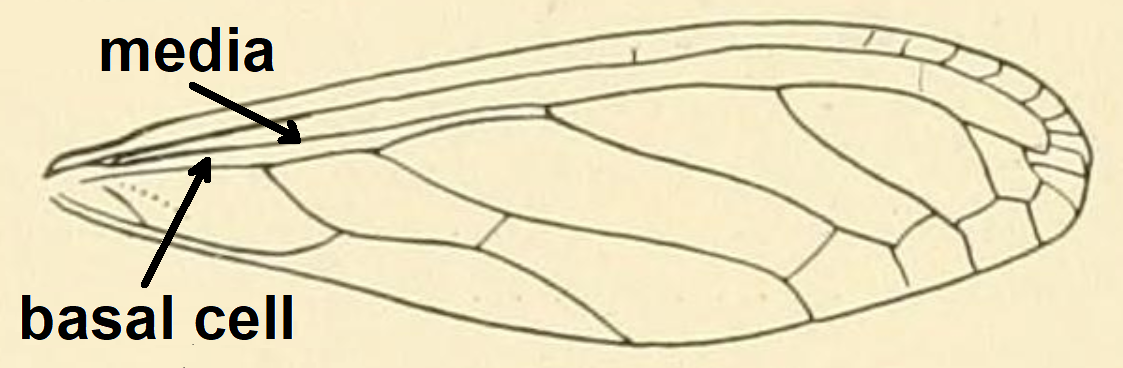
Original drawing by Muir of the forewing of Leomelicharia fuscovittata with the media and the median basal cell marked

Type species: Leomelicharia rufovittata. The species in the genus Leomelicharia Muir 1913 have been described as similar to the genus Sikaiana, but with the “median basal cell” in the forewings being very narrow and long, reaching or almost reaching the middle of the wing. Further, the hind wings are very small in this genus, but contain a stridulation plate. In addition, the antennae are constricted around the middle and are indented at the base of the arista. The more recently described genus Ceropupa has similar features (see above). The coloration of the species has been described as light brown, yellowish, bright red or reddish brown.

Leomelicharia was named after the entomologist Leopold Melichar. However, in Muir's original description the name was misspelled as Loemelicharia. In later publications as well as in the list of illustrations of his original description, Muir used Leomelicharia and this spelling is currently in use.

=== Genus Muiria Kirkaldy 1907 ===
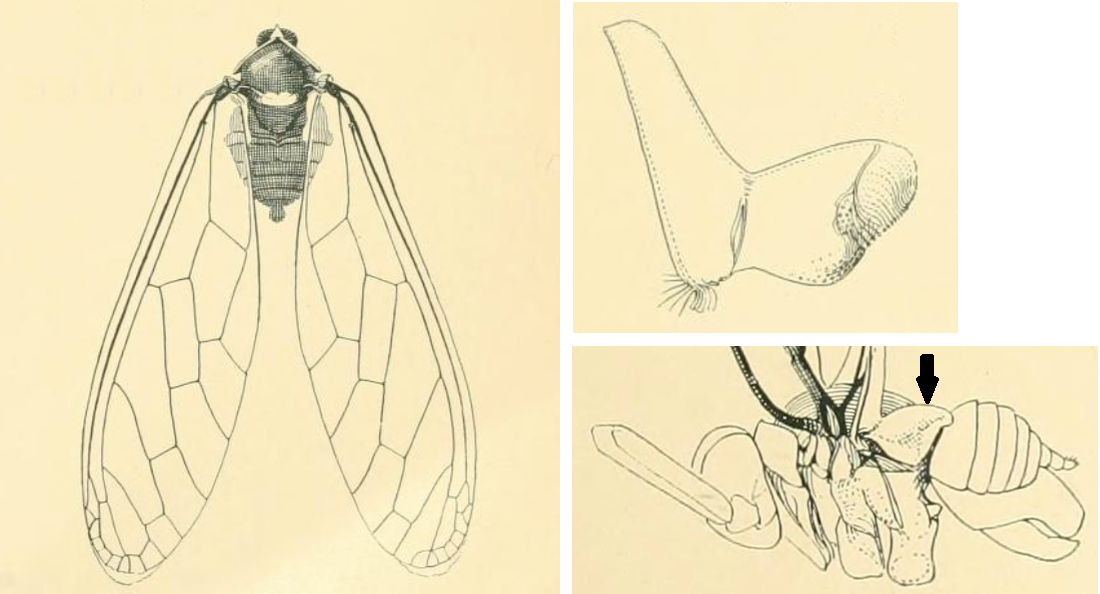
Original illustrations by G.W. Kirkaldy of Muiria stridula - left: dorsal view of insect, upper right: hind wing (enlarged), lower right: side view of insect with arrow pointing at hind wing

Type species: Muiria stridula. The genus Muiria was named by Kirkaldy after his friend (and colleague) Muir. The name of the type species, Muiria stridula, was based on Muir's observations of the stridulation activities of that species in Fiji. Muir observed hundreds of red hoppers sitting on the lower surface of palm leaves and these were making audible stridulation sounds by moving their abdomen up and down. Apart from the minute hind wings which are evidently used mainly for stridulation, the genus Muiria is characterized by its long antennae that are longer than head and thorax combined. The antennae are sometimes described as flattened. The species are partly or predominantly red, brownish, yellowish or straw-colored.

=== Genus Mula Ball 1928 ===
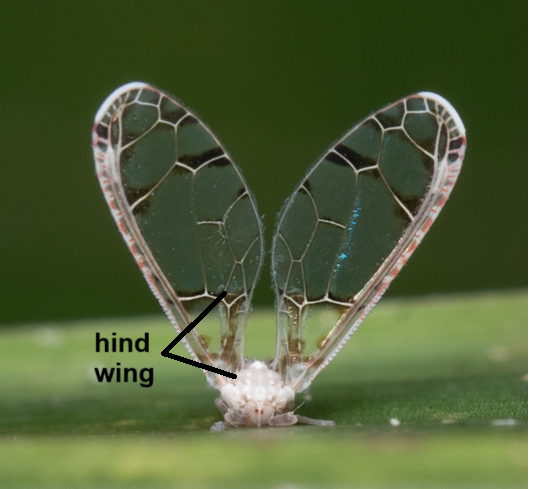
Image of Mula resonans with the size of one hind wing marked

Type species: Mula resonans. The genus Mula has been described as being similar to the genera Muiria and Sikaiana. Compared to species of the genus Sikaiana, species of Mula have distinctly shorter and narrower hind wings. In addition, the antennae are longer. The differences between Mula and Muiria are less consistent. The type species Mula resonans clearly differs from the type species Muiria stridula by having longer hind wings and shorter antennae. However, Mula chushanensis also has very short hind wings. The American Mula species have a whitish coloration, but Mula chushanensis is grayish yellow.

=== Genus Sikaiana Distant 1907 ===
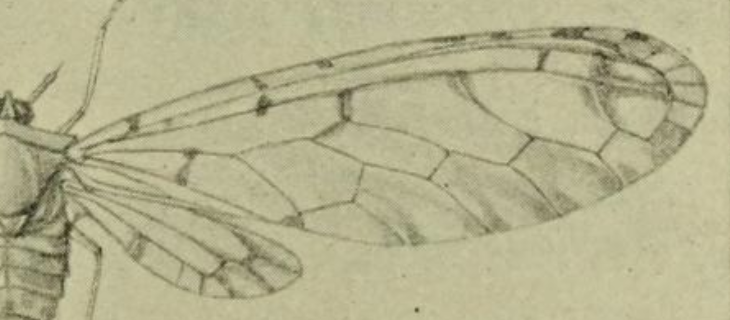
Original drawing by Distant of the wings of Sikaiana hyalinata

Type species: Sikaiana hyalinata. The species of Sikaiana differ from the other genera in the tribe Sikaianini by the comparatively long hind wings. These are at least one third (but not more than one half) of the forewing length. The antennae are usually shorter than in the other genera, but they are at least as long as the face (frons) and often longer. The forewing venation also differs from that of other genera. The coloration of the species has been most often described as straw-colored, brownish, yellowish, reddish-brown or whitish with some parts or marks colored differently, for example red, orange, dark brown or black. The taxonomy of the genus Sikaiana is in need of a revision.

== See also ==
- Rhotanini
- Zoraidini
