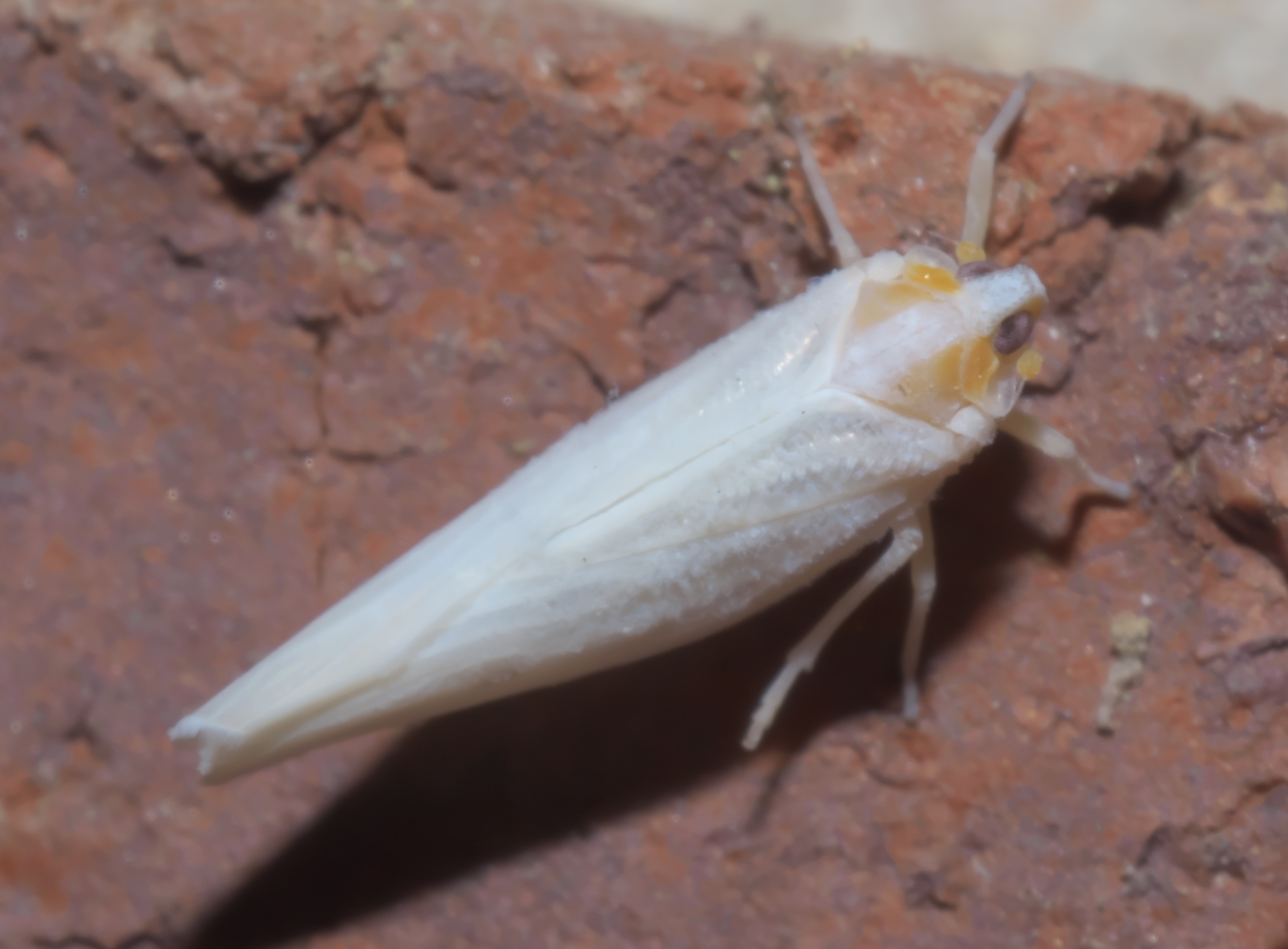
- Neocenchrea heidemanni

Scientific classification
- Domain: Eukaryota
- Kingdom: Animalia
- Phylum: Arthropoda
- Class: Insecta
- Order: Hemiptera
- Suborder: Auchenorrhyncha
- Infraorder: Fulgoromorpha
- Family: Derbidae
- Subfamily: Derbinae; Spinola, 1839

= Derbinae =

Subfamily of true bugs

Derbinae is a subfamily of derbid planthoppers in the family Derbidae.

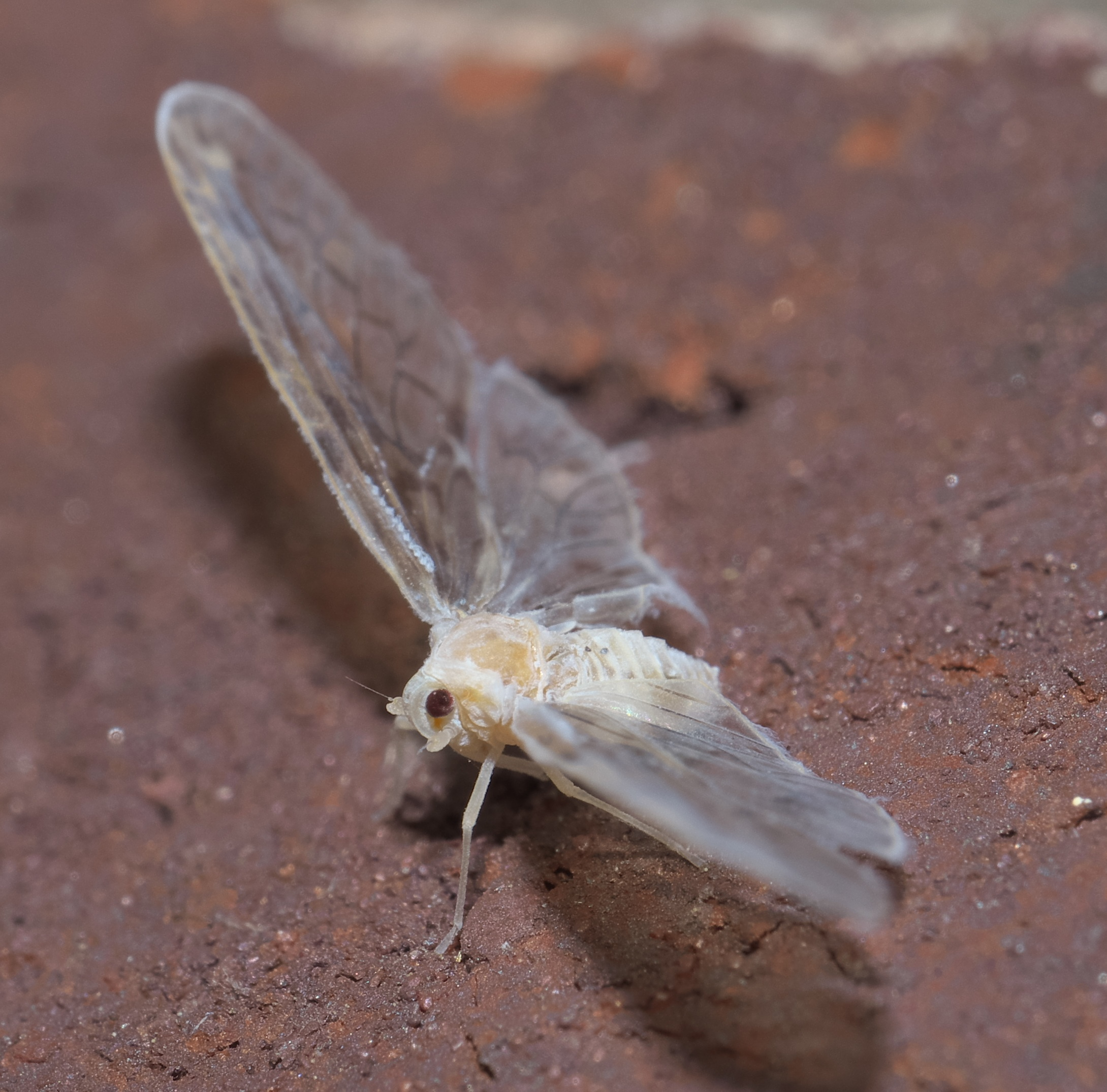
Paramysidia mississippiensis

== Genera ==
These 49 genera belong to the subfamily Derbinae:

- Aethocauda Williams, 1976^{c g}
- Amania Synave, 1973^{c g}
- Amysidiella Broomfield, 1985^{c g}
- Anchimothon Fennah, 1952^{c g}
- Aquaelicium Distant, 1917^{c g}
- Basileocephalus Kirkaldy, 1906^{c g}
- Cedochrea Emeljanov, 1995^{c g}
- Cedochrusa Emeljanov, 2008^{c g}
- Cenanges Fennah, 1952^{c g}
- Cenchrea Westwood, 1840^{c g}
- Contigucephalus Caldwell, 1944^{c g}
- Copallinges Szwedo, 2004^{c g}
- Cyclometopum Muir, 1913^{c g}
- Dawnaria Distant, 1911^{c g}
- Dawnarioides Dozier, 1929^{c g}
- Derbe Fabricius, 1803^{c g}
- Dysimia Muir, 1924^{c g b}
- Dysimiella Broomfield, 1985^{c g}
- Equirria Distant, 1917^{c g}
- Fescennia Stål, 1886^{c}
- Fordicidia Distant, 1917^{c g}
- Goneokara Muir, 1913^{c g}
- Herpis Stål, 1860^{c g}
- Ipsemysidia Broomfield, 1985^{c g}
- Lamenia Stål, 1859^{i c g}
- Malenia Haupt, 1924^{c g}
- Muirileguatia Metcalf, 1945^{c g}
- Mysidaloides Broomfield, 1985^{c g}
- Mysidia Westwood, 1840^{c g}
- Neocenchrea Metcalf, 1923^{c g b}
- Neocyclokara Muir, 1917^{c g}
- Neodawnaria O'Brien, 1982^{c g}
- Neolamenia Muir, 1917^{c g}
- Neomysidia Broomfield, 1985^{c g}
- Nicerta Walker, 1857^{c g}
- Omolicna Fennah, 1945^{c g b}
- Oropuna Fennah, 1952^{c g}
- Paramysidia Broomfield, 1985^{c g b}
- Paraphenice Muir, 1924^{c g}
- Patara Westwood, 1840^{c g b}
- Perandenina Distant, 1911^{c g}
- Persis Stål, 1860^{c g b}
- Phaciocephalus Kirkaldy, 1906^{c g}
- Phenice Westwood, 1840^{c g}
- Pseudomysidia Metcalf, 1938^{c g}
- Symidia Muir, 1918^{c g}
- Syntames Fowler, 1905^{g}
- Vekunta Distant, 1906^{c g}
- Vinata Distant, 1906^{c g}

Data sources: i = ITIS, c = Catalogue of Life, g = GBIF, b = Bugguide.net
