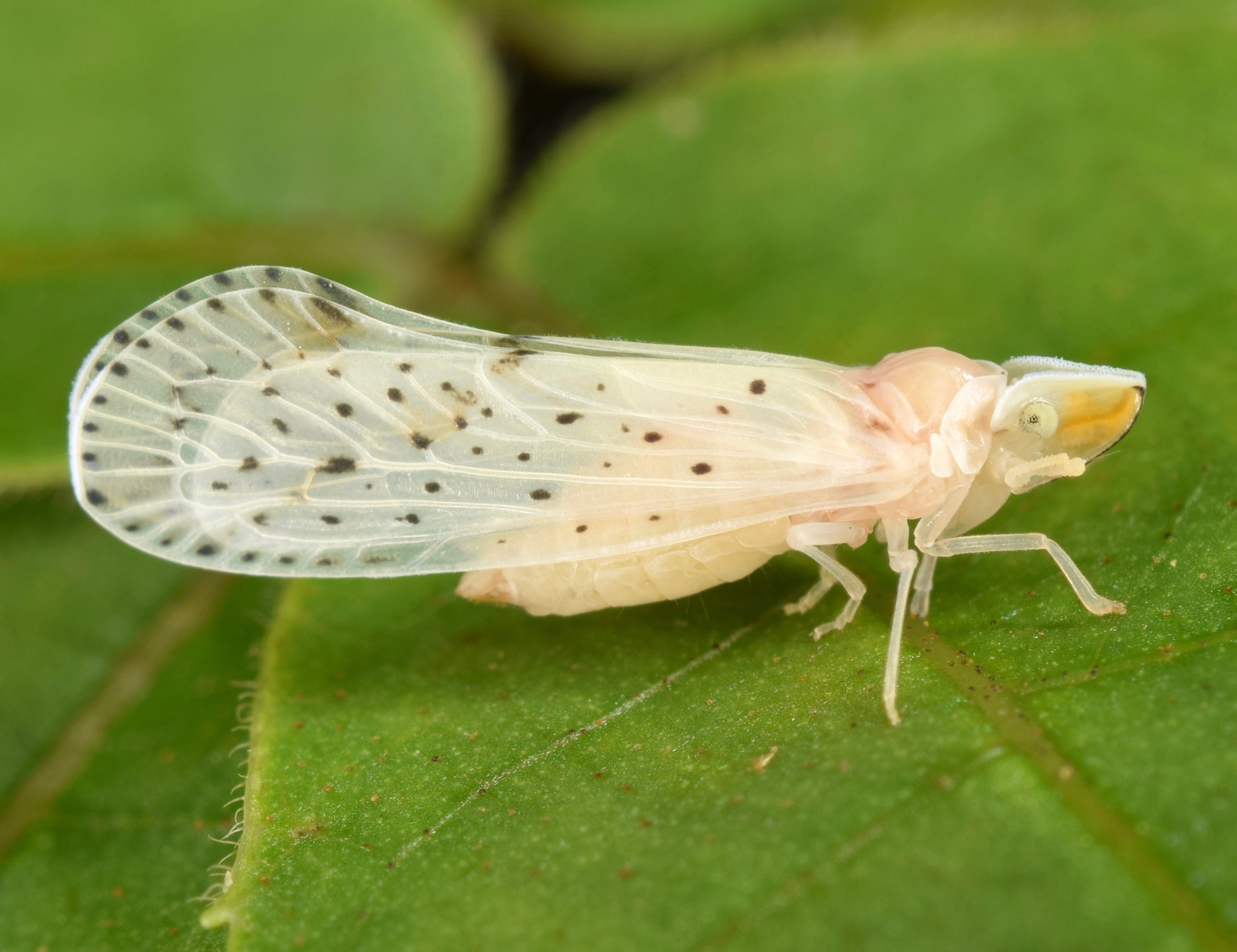
- Otiocerus abbotii

Scientific classification
- Kingdom: Animalia
- Phylum: Arthropoda
- Clade: Pancrustacea
- Class: Insecta
- Order: Hemiptera
- Suborder: Auchenorrhyncha
- Infraorder: Fulgoromorpha
- Superfamily: Fulgoroidea
- Family: Derbidae; Spinola, 1839

Subfamilies
- Breddiniolinae Fennah, 1950; Derbinae Spinola 1839; Otiocerinae Muir, 1917

= Derbidae =

Family of true bugs

The family Derbidae (commonly called derbids) is a large and diverse group of planthoppers (Fulgoroidea, Hemiptera), widely distributed in the tropics and also found in subtropical and temperate regions. It includes more than 150 genera and more than 1500 species. The adults suck the sap of plants while the nymphs live mainly in decaying organic matter, for example under the bark of dead tree trunks, feeding on fungi. In some groups of species the general structure of the insects is largely uniform, whereas in others like in the subfamily Otiocerinae various forms can be found. For example, the shape of the head, the antennae or the wings can differ considerably among genera and species.

== Description ==
Derbids are typically 5–10 mm long from head to the end of the forewings. They can be distinguished from other planthopper families by a combination of different characters, the most important one being the very short terminal segment of the rostrum which is often only as long as wide. The illustration of Eocenchrea maorica on this page highlights the short terminal segment and also shows the general appearance of a derbid which is found in a number of tribes. The species in this example is from the tribe Cenchreini, subfamily Derbinae. In this form, the length of the body from head to tip of the abdomen is slightly more than half the length from head to tip of the forewings. The end of the wings and the profile of the head are uniformly rounded, the wings are held in a roof-like (tectiform) position when the insect is at rest and the antennae are small and inconspicuous.

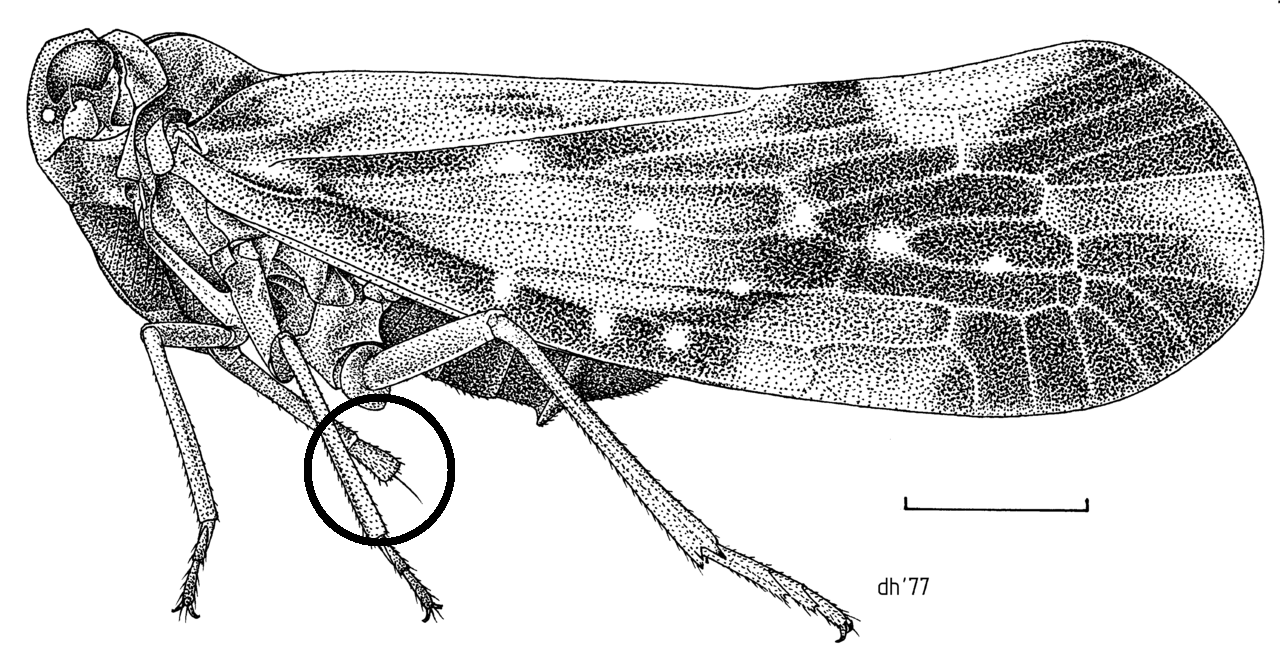
Eocenchrea maorica - short terminal segment of rostrum highlighted

Various other forms can be found among the Derbidae, especially in the shape and length of the wings, how these are held at rest, as well as the structure of the head and the antennae. These less common features may be important for placing a derbid in the respective subfamily and tribe. For example, the forewings may be extremely long and narrow while the hindwings are very small (tribe Zoraidini). The wings may be also spread out widely when the insects are at rest. The head may be extended and extremely compressed in frontal view with the anterior part consisting of two thin, leaf-like blades. The antennae may be long and branched. Derbidae might also have striking colors and wing pattern. Some of these different forms, colors and wing pattern are illustrated in the gallery below.

Diversity of forms and wing patterns in the family Derbidae (tribes in brackets)

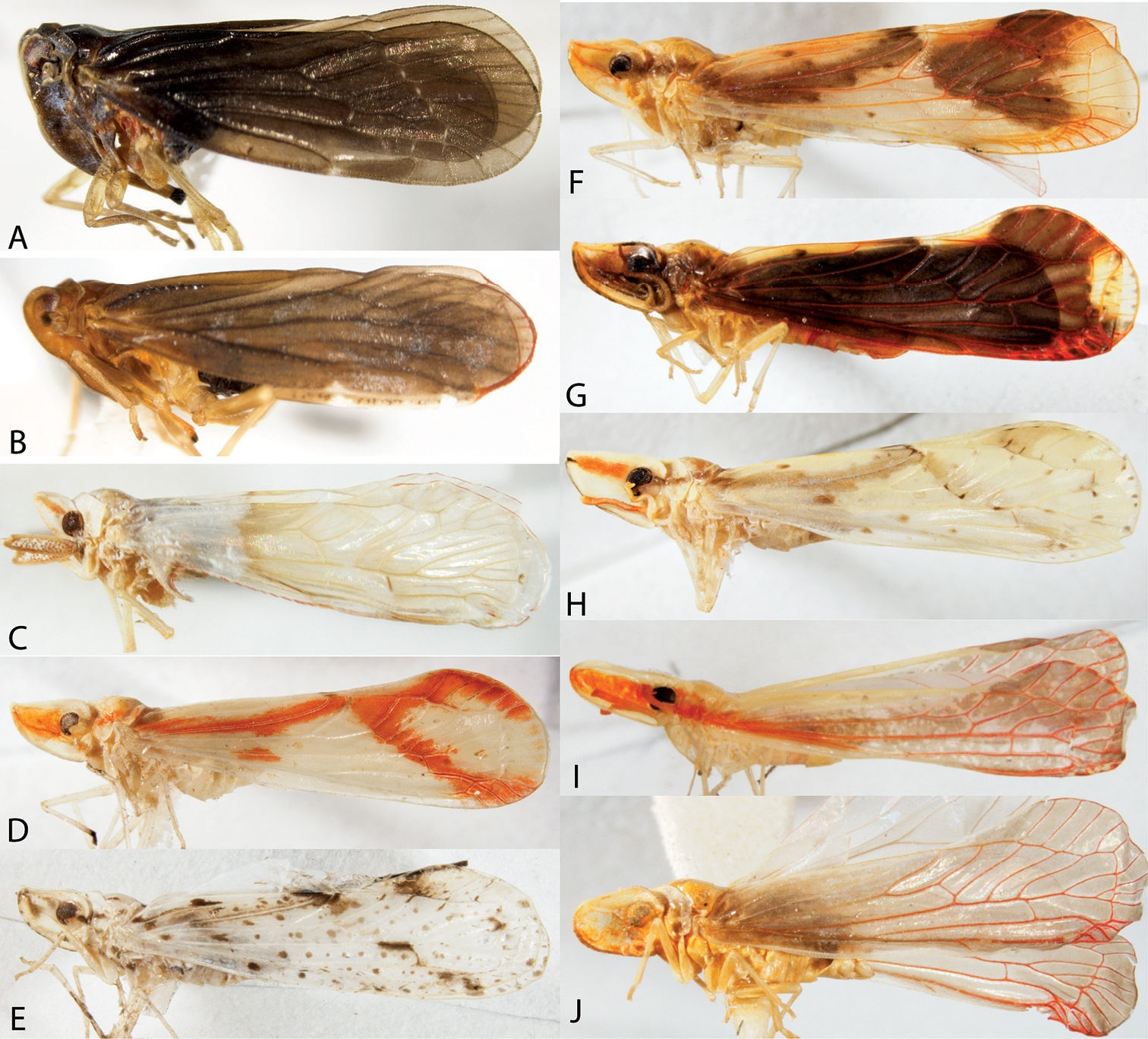
Diversity of shapes and colors of 10 derbids shown in side view

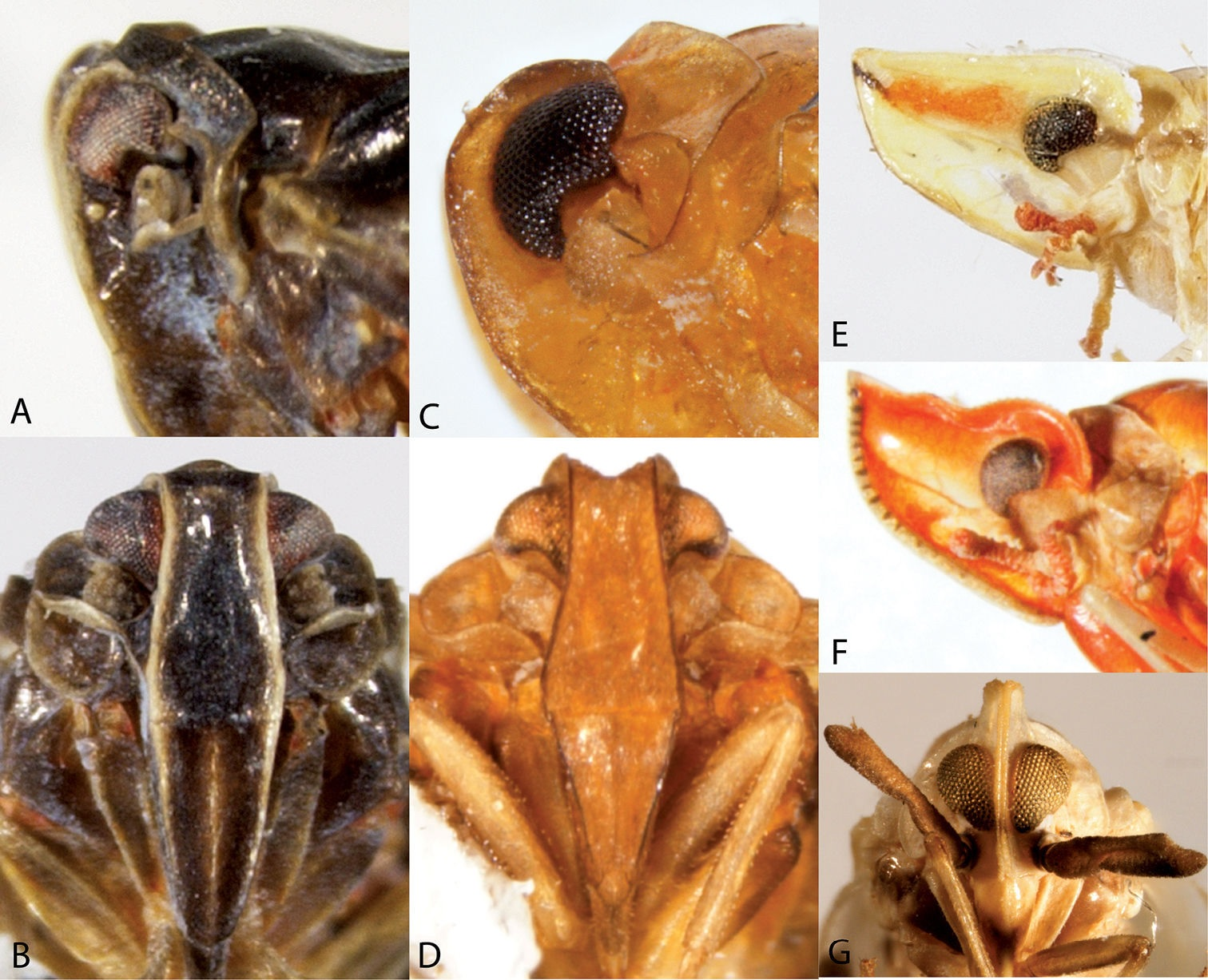
Diversity of shapes of head in Derbidae

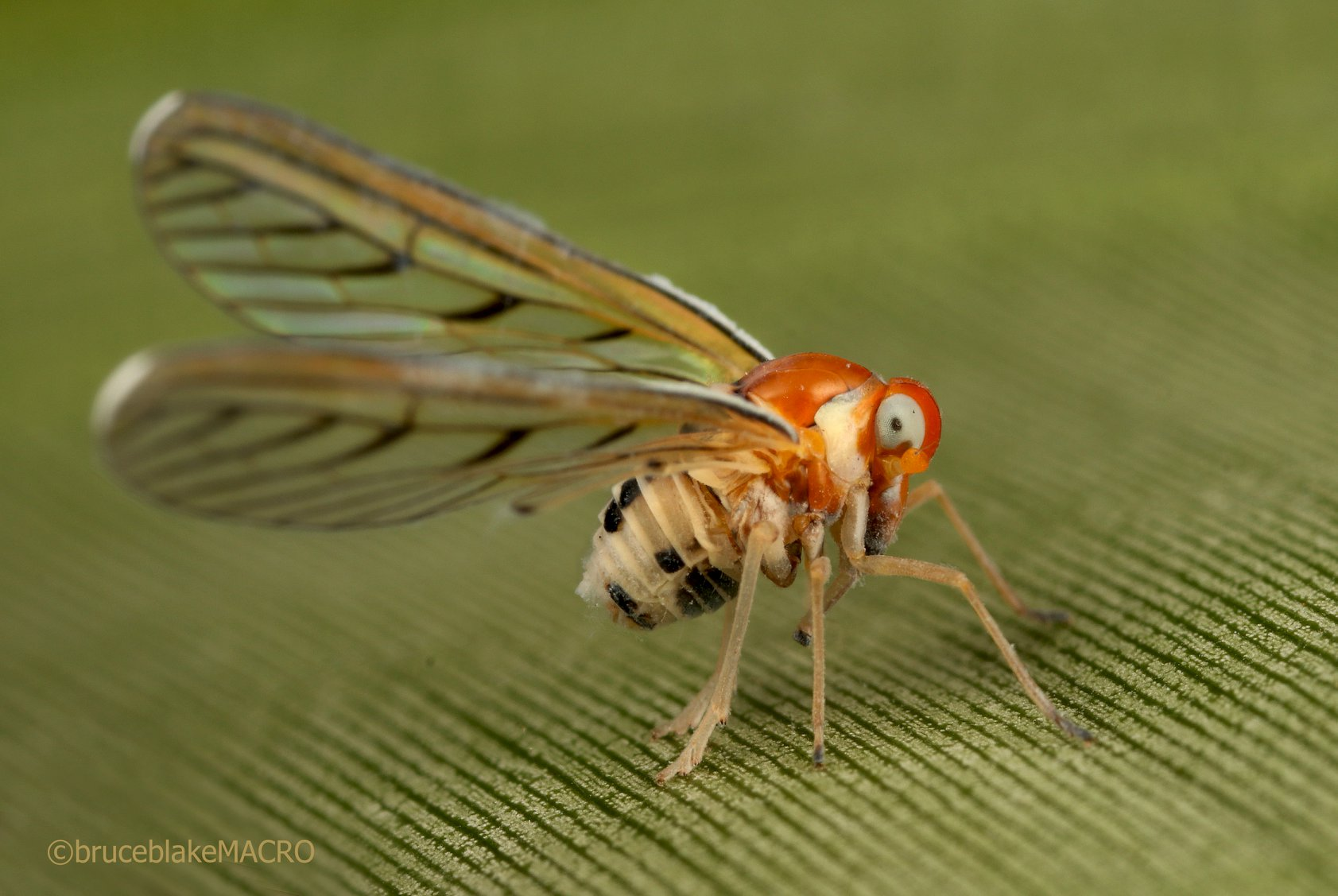
Diostrombus abdominalis on a leaf (Zoraidini)

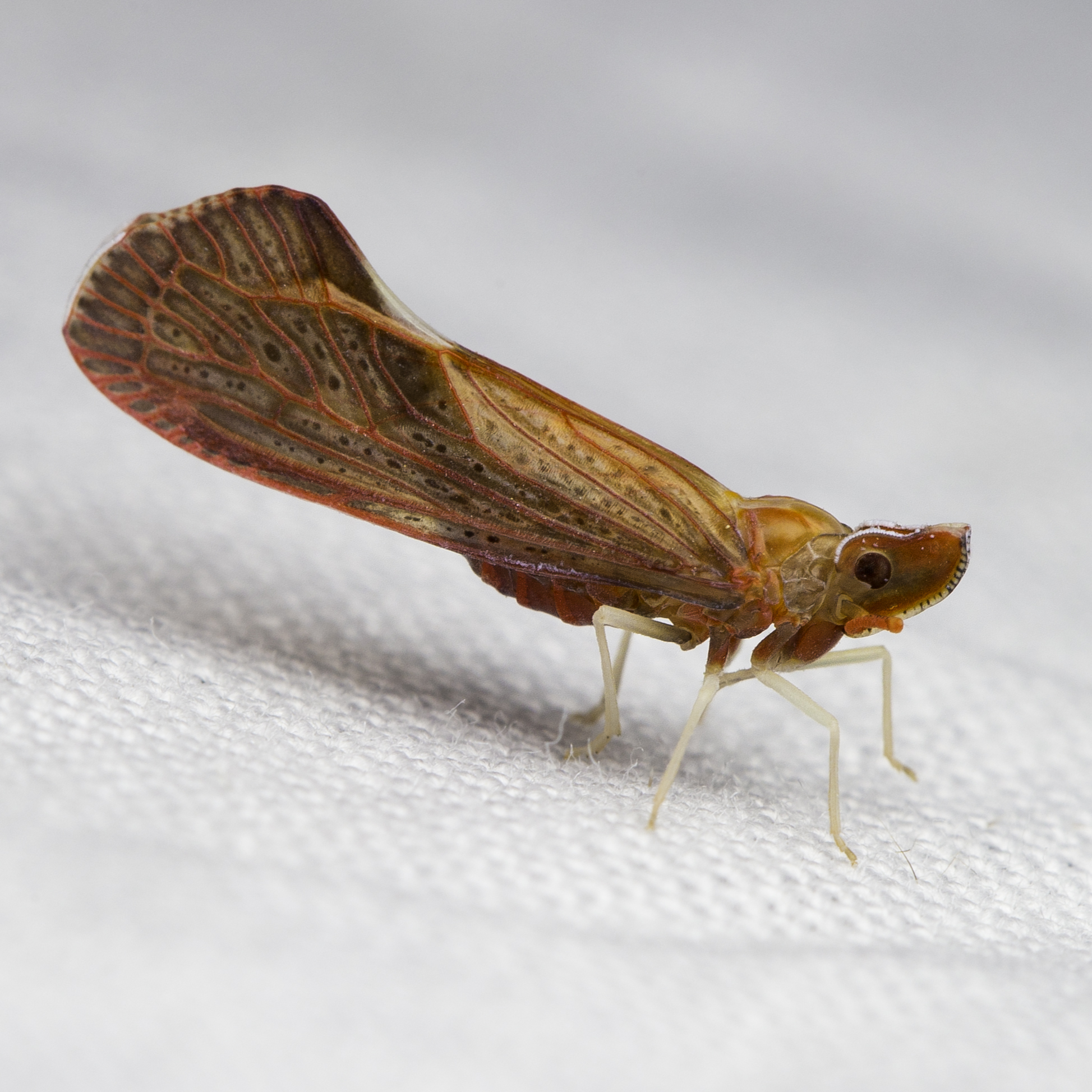
Apache californicum (Otiocerini)

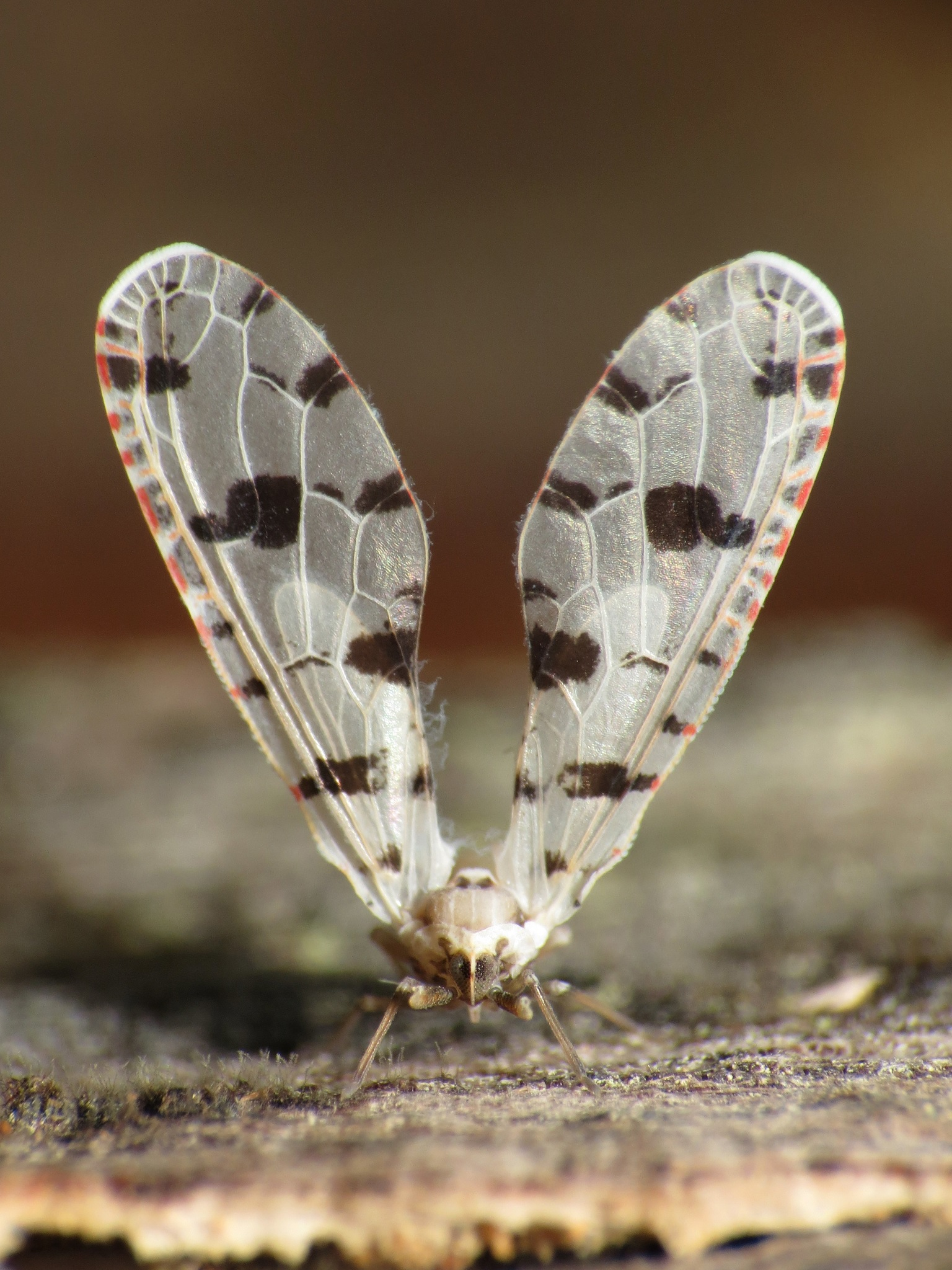
Sikaiana harti (Sikaianini)

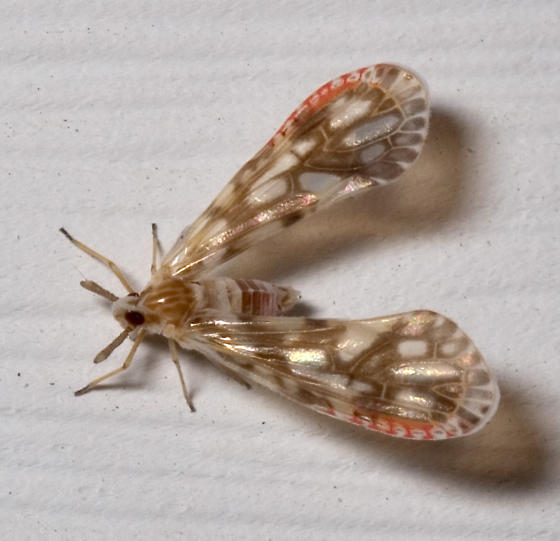
Anotia_bonnetii (Otiocerini)

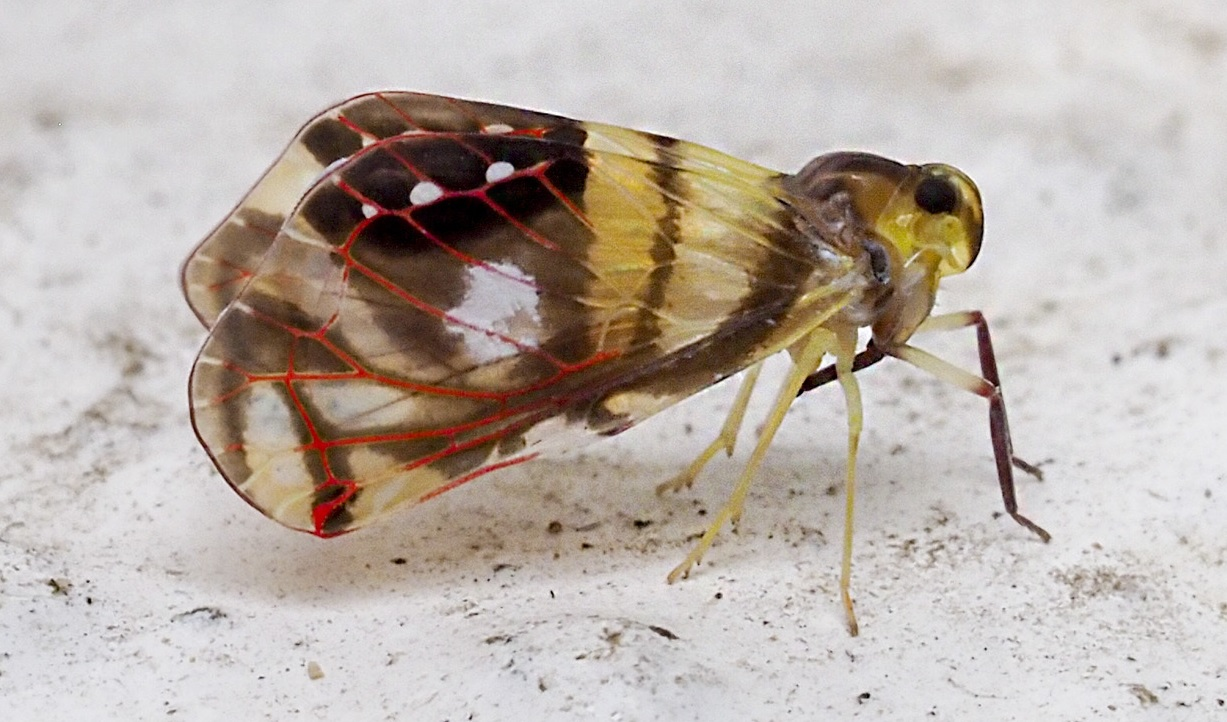
Rhotana marmorata (Rhotanini)

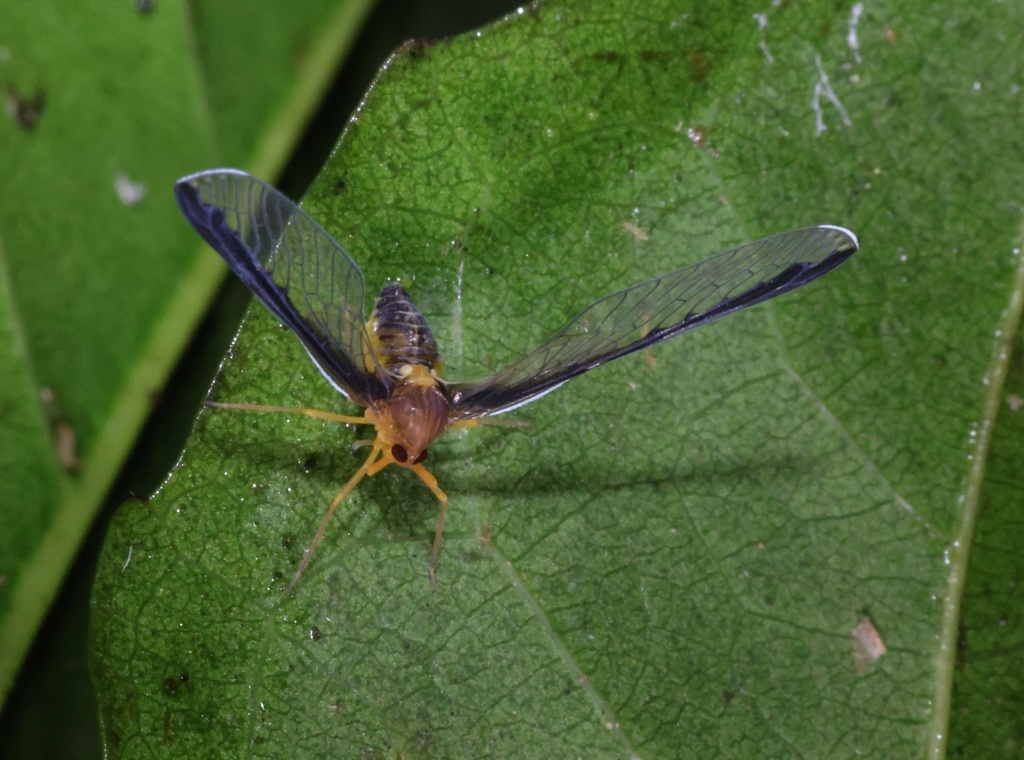
Zoraida pterophoroides (Zoraidini)

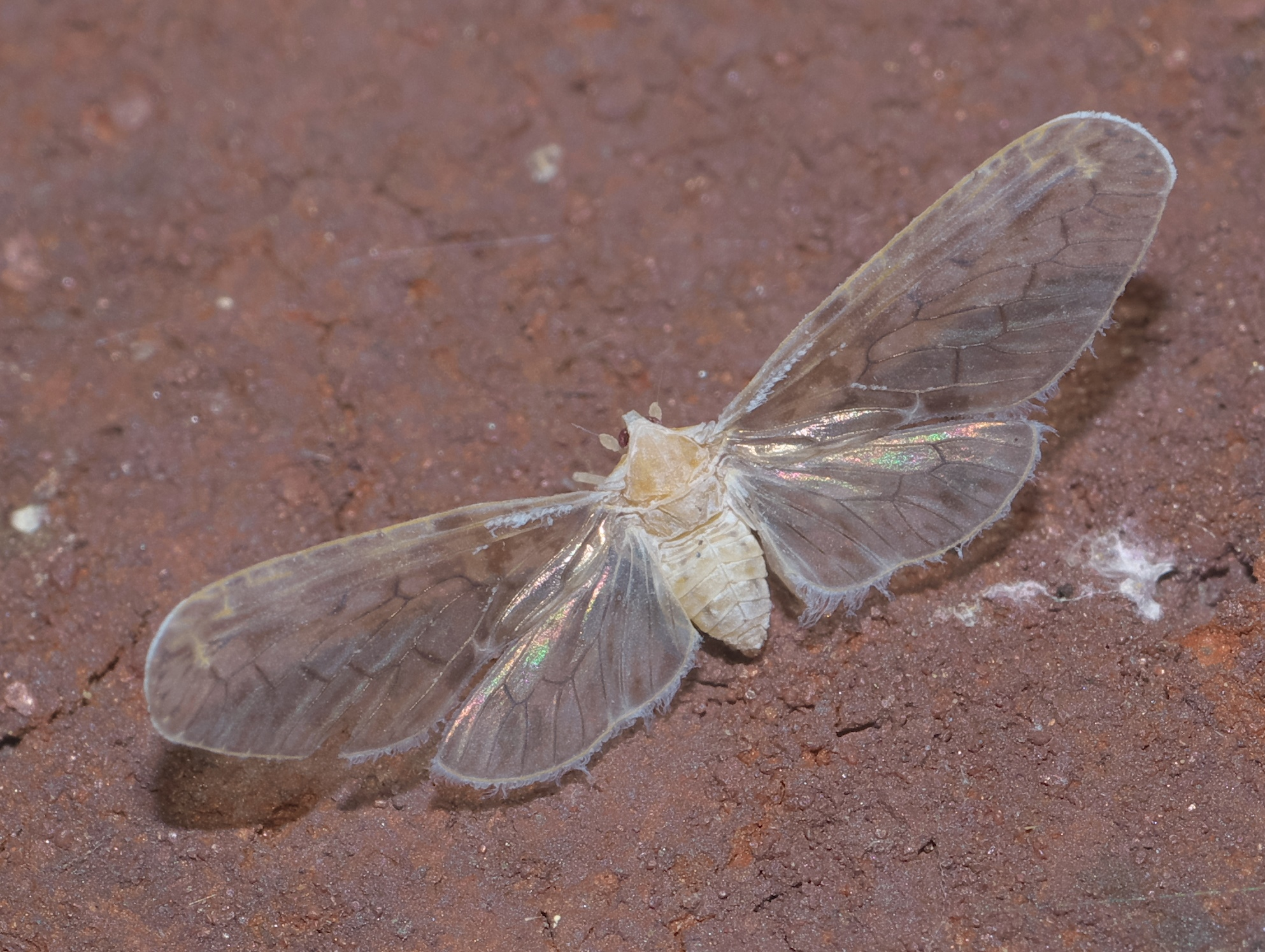
Paramysidia mississippiensis (Derbini)

== Biology ==
Information on the biology of the Derbidae is scarce. They clearly belong to the planthoppers which by nature feed by sucking the sap of plants and they have the corresponding mouthparts. However, relatively little is known about their life cycle, their feeding habits and their host plants. Monocots, especially palm trees, are often the preferred hosts. Still, the adults are often described as "gathering" or "resting" on the plants. The nymphal stages have been found associated with decaying organic matter like decaying tree trunks. For example, they have been found under the bark of dead trees or in heaps of palm debris, where they feed on fungi. In contrast, the nymphs of Cedusa hedusa were collected from mats of the moss Polytrichum commune in southern North America, where they were feeding either on fungi associated with the moss, or on the moss itself.

Several derbids are suspected of transmitting phytoplasma diseases of palms. However, no clear evidence for such transmission has been reported so far. In Mozambique, Diostrombus mkurangai (tribe Zoraidini) was one of the most common sap-sucking insects on coconut palms affected by the lethal yellowing disease and the causal phytoplasma agent was present in this derbid. In Ghana, a similar disease called Cape Saint Paul Wilt also affects coconut palms and derbids from the genera Diostrombus and Patara were again common on diseased palms. In a transmission trial, derbids were collected from diseased palms and placed in cages together with healthy palms. One of two coconut palms exposed to 4,380 Diostrombus derbids tested positive for the disease with PCR, but failed to develop symptoms. In Jamaica, 13 out of 43 derbids from the genus Cedusa (tribe Cedusini) collected from coconut palms in an area affected by the coconut lethal yellowing disease contained a phytoplasma similar to the causal agent of that disease. In Florida, Omolicna joi (tribe Cenchreini) was one of three species of planthoppers common on sabal palms affected by the phytoplasma disease Texas Phoenix Palm Decline.

== Taxonomy ==
Most studies on Derbidae have dealt with their taxonomy. The family is morphologically most similar to the sister family Achilidae and some genera have features matching both families. For example, the genus Breddiniola has been traditionally assigned to the family Achilidae, but is now placed in the family Derbidae. The classification of the different subgroups of the Derbidae (subfamilies and tribes) has also changed repeatedly over the years.

While there seems to be no disagreement among authors on the classification of the different planthopper families, there are few DNA analyses which could confirm the taxonomy of the planthoppers, as well as clarify the phyllogenetics within the Derbidae. A study from 2005 has analysed the DNA of 53 planthopper species (including 5 derbids) from 15 families. It confirmed the close relationship between the Derbidae and the Achilidae and also revealed a close relationship between the Derbidae and the Tropiduchidae.

As of 2024, 1722 species of Derbidae in 166 genera have been described world-wide. However, judging from images published on the internet, many species remain undescribed. In a revision of the tribe Rhotanini in 2011, 294 species were listed and more than half of them (178) were described as new.

The genera of Derbidae are assigned to the following 3 subfamilies and 22 tribes:

- Subfamily Breddiniolinae Fennah, 1950
1. Tribe Breddiniolini Fennah 1950
2. Tribe Cedusini Emeljanov 1992
3. Tribe Derbachilini Emeljanov & Shcherbakov 2020 (extinct)
4. Tribe Goneokarellini Emeljanov 1995
5. Tribe Ipsnolini Emeljanov 1995
6. Tribe Phrygiini Emeljanov 1995
7. Tribe Ptychoptilini Emeljanov, 1990 (extinct)
8. Tribe Vinatini Emeljanov 1992
- Subfamily Derbinae Spinola 1839
1. Tribe Cedochreini Emeljanov, 1995
2. Tribe Cenchreini Muir, 1913
3. Tribe Dawnarioidini Emeljanov 1995
4. Tribe Derbini Spinola 1839
5. Tribe Nicertini Emeljanov 1992
- Subfamily Otiocerinae Muir, 1917
1. Tribe Aquaeliciini Banaszkiewicz & Szwedo, 2005
2. Tribe Kamendakini Emeljanov 1995
3. Tribe Neocyclokarini Emeljanov 1995
4. Tribe Otiocerini Muir, 1918
5. Tribe Patarini Emeljanov, 1995
6. Tribe Phenicini Emeljanov 1995
7. Tribe Rhotanini Muir, 1918
8. Tribe Sikaianini Muir 1918
9. Tribe Zoraidini Muir 1918
