= A. nasutus =

A. nasutus may refer to:

- Acestrorhynchus nasutus, a species of fish
- Agapostemon nasutus, a species of sweat bee
- Airaphilus nasutus, a species of beetle in the genus Airaphilus
- Allonitis nasutus, a species of beetle in the genus Allonitis
- Amblytylus nasutus, a species of true bug
- Ammoplanus nasutus, a species of wasp in the genus Ammoplanus
- Amphidees nasutus, a species of weevil in the subfamily Entiminae
- Anchimolgus nasutus, a species of copepod in the family Anchimolgidae
- Anisops nasutus, a species of true bug in the genus Anisops
- Anomocopeus nasutus, a species of booklouse in the family Trogiidae
- Antrocephalus nasutus, a species of wasp in the subfamily Haltichellinae
- Apristurus nasutus, a species of catshark
- Astyanax nasutus, a species of fish in the genus Astyanax
- Atanygnathus nasutus, a species of beetle in the genus Atanygnathus
- Atopopompilus nasutus, a species of wasp in the family Pompilidae
- Atractus nasutus, a species of snake
