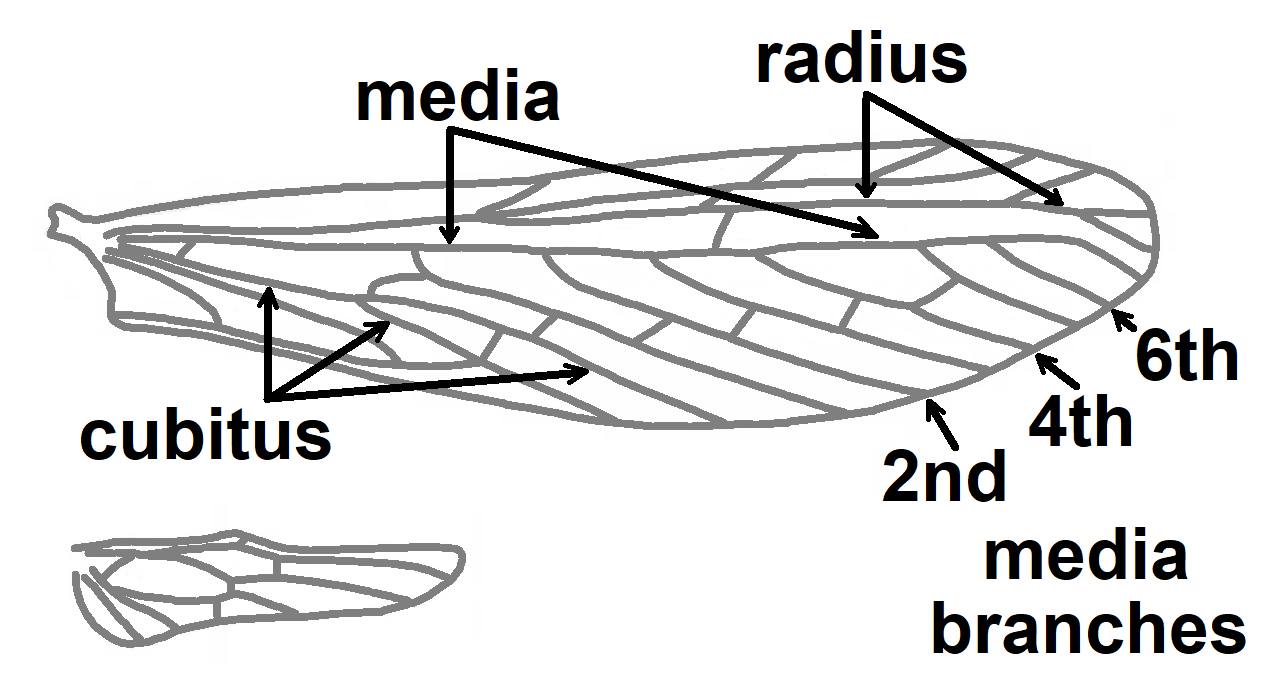
- Venation of forewing (top) and hind wing (bottom) of Lyddastrombus annetti

Scientific classification
- Kingdom: Animalia
- Phylum: Arthropoda
- Clade: Pancrustacea
- Class: Insecta
- Order: Hemiptera
- Suborder: Auchenorrhyncha
- Infraorder: Fulgoromorpha
- Family: Derbidae
- Subfamily: Otiocerinae
- Tribe: Zoraidini
- Genus: Lyddastrombus (van Stalle, 1992)

Synonyms
- Diostrombus (Lyddastrombus) van Stalle, 1992

= Lyddastrombus =

Genus of planthoppers

Lyddastrombus is a small genus of planthoppers from the family Derbidae, tribe Zoraidini, currently (2024) with 8 African species. The morphology of the species is similar to those in the genus Lydda and most species have been originally described as part of Lydda. Lyddastrombus species can be recognized by the venation of their forewings and other features. The genus also shows similarities to the genera Diostrombus and Proutista, sharing with them the short antennae and a related forewing venation, where the media vein has 6 branches with none of them forking further into sub branches. However, Lyddastrombus species differ from both genera by their much broader head. Lyddastrombus was original described as a subgenus of Diostrombus, but it is now regarded as a separate genus, due to the broader head. The species of Lyddastrombus are found mainly in the tropical rainforests of West Africa from Sierra Leone over Nigeria to the Democratic Republic of the Congo, but have been also reported from parts of eastern Africa (Malawi, Mozambique and Tanzania). Lyddastrombus hoppers have been frequently reported feeding on coconut and oil palms. In Mozambique, they were found to be carriers of a phytoplasma disease of coconut palms.

Type species: Diospolis annetti Muir, 1918, a synonym of Lyddastrombus annetti

== Description ==
The species of Lyddastrombus can be distinguished from other similar genera of the tribe Zoraidini (like the genera Lydda, Diostrombus and Proutista) by a combination of different characters on the head and the wings, as well by the structure of the aedeagus in males. These features include:

- on the forewing, the media vein has 6 branches and none of these fork further into sub branches, in Lydda the media vein has only 5 branches;
- the head is unusually broad, about as broad or almost as broad as the thorax, but much narrower in Diostrombus and Proutista;
- the antennae are short compared to genera like Pamendanga, Peggia or Zoraida, the 2nd antennal segment, the pedicel, is less than two times longer than wide;
- the hind wings are shorter than half the length of the forewings (about half as long in Lydda and Proutista);
- the vertex (the dorsal part of the head between the eyes) is not separated from the face by a ridge.

The combination of a broad head and a media vein on the forewing with 6 branches which do not fork further is the most important feature for distinguishing Lyddastrombus species from other similar genera. Within the tribe Zoraidini, Lyddastrombus species are of medium size, the body measures around 3 mm from the tip of the head to the end of the abdomen and the forewings are about 8 mm long. The forewings do not have the club-shaped outline found in many species of Proutista, instead their width increases evenly from the base reaching the greatest width around the middle of the wing.

Images of live specimens are very rare. One image of Lyddastrombus mayumbensis (labelled Diostrombus mayumbensis, a synonym name) suggests that the wings are raised above the body and are spread out at an angle of 45-60° when the insects are at rest, similar to species of Lydda, Diostrombus and Proutista. This image also suggests that live specimens of L. mayumbensis are basically light yellowish green with some straw-coloured parts and some brownish-black marks on thorax and abdomen. Museum specimens often lose their original colour and images of a paratype of that species show a light brown colouration, but similar marks on the abdomen. The taxonomic descriptions of this and other species in the genus Lyddastrombus describe the basic colour as yellowish white, bright yellow or brownish yellow with some black or dark brown parts.

== Distribution ==
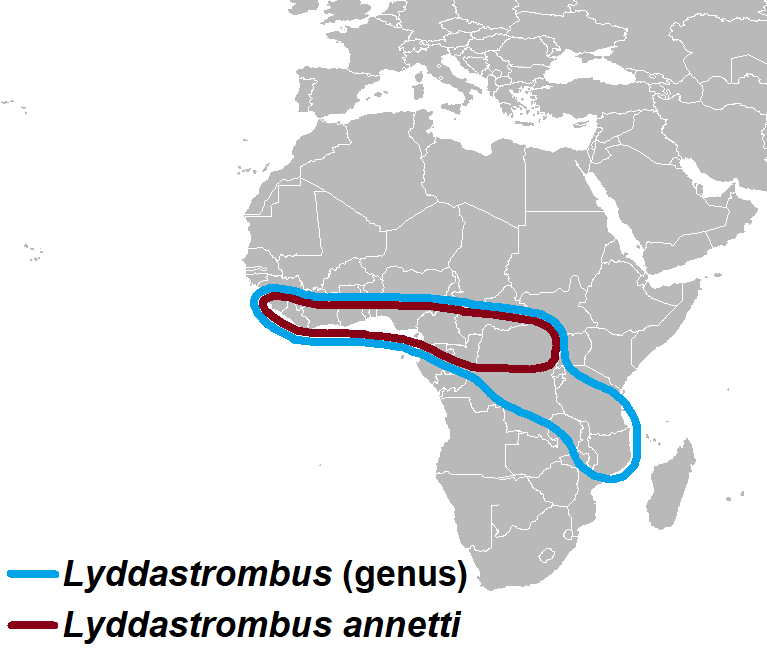
Distribution ranges of the species in the genus Lyddastrombus (blue outline) and that of Lyddastrombus annetti, the type species (brown outline)

The species of Lyddastrombus mainly live in tropical parts of West Africa, ranging from Sierra Leone in the West over the Ivory Coast, Ghana and Nigeria to the Democratic Republic of the Congo in the East. Further, the species Lyddastrombus mayumbensis and Lyddastrombus woodi are found in eastern Africa (Malawi, Mozambique and Tanzania). Most distribution records refer to the old generic combinations of Lyddastrombus species. That means the species are listed under the genera Lydda or Diostrombus.

== Biology ==
There is no information on the biology of the immature stages of Lyddastrombus species. However, it can be assumed that they live in decaying organic matter like other derbids, feeding on fungi. The adult hoppers of 6 Lyddastrombus species have been reported to feed on coconut and oil palms in West Africa (Sierra Leone and Ghana). The observations in Ghana were part of studies attempting to identify the vector of a coconut phytoplasma disease. Similar studies in eastern Africa (Mozambique and Tanzania) found Lyddastrombus woodi and an unidentified Lyddastrombus species on coconut palms. In addition, PCR tests for the disease agent gave positive results for the unidentified Lyddastrombus species in Mozambique, suggesting it could be a vector of coconut phytoplasma diseases.

== Taxonomy and species ==
The genus Lyddastrombus was originally described as a subgenus of Diostrombus, but the status was later changed to a full genus. During the original description, 8 species were assigned to the subgenus. Seven of these had been previously described under the genus Lydda or its synonym Diospolis (L. annetti, L. cocos, L. elaeidis, L. hargreavesi, L. lineatipes, L. mayumbensis, L. woodi) and one under the genus Derbe which had been later assigned to the genus Diostrombus (L. biclavatus). The genus is not very well known. Lists of species are often incomplete and the species may be still referred to under the genera Diostrombus or Lydda.

The following species have been studied as possible vectors of coconut diseases:

- Lyddastrombus annetti (Muir, 1918)
- Lyddastrombus lineatipes (Muir, 1926)
- Lyddastrombus mayumbensis (Synave, 1966)
- Lyddastrombus woodi (Muir, 1926)
