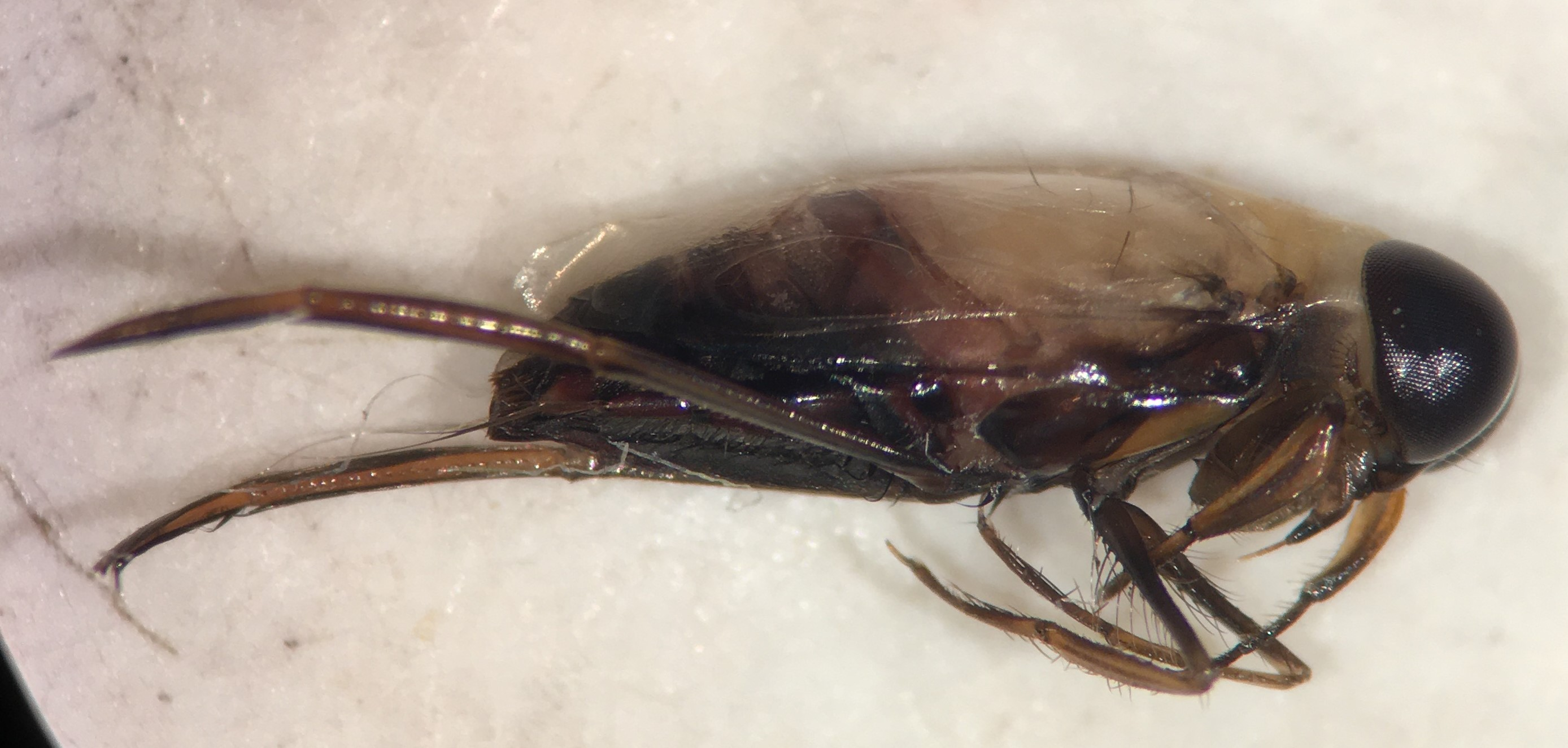
- Buenoa marki

Scientific classification
- Kingdom: Animalia
- Phylum: Arthropoda
- Clade: Pancrustacea
- Class: Insecta
- Order: Hemiptera
- Suborder: Heteroptera
- Family: Notonectidae
- Subfamily: Anisopinae
- Genus: Buenoa; Kirkaldy, 1904

Type species
- Anisops antigone Kirkaldy, 1899

= Buenoa =

Genus of true bugs

Buenoa is a genus of backswimmer. It was created by George Willis Kirkaldy in 1904 to include all species of Anisops from the Western Hemisphere with a two-segmented front tarsus in males, reserving the latter genus for Eastern Hemisphere species with a one-segmented front tarsus in males. It contains 69 described species.

== Species ==
- Buenoa absidata Truxal, 1953
- Buenoa albida (Champion, 1901)
- Buenoa alterna Truxal, 1953
- Buenoa amazona Padilla-Gil, 2003
- Buenoa amnigenoidea Nieser, 1970
- Buenoa amnigenopsis Nieser, 1975
- Buenoa amnigenus (White, 1879)
- Buenoa analoga Padilla-Gil, 2012
- Buenoa anomala Padilla-Gil, 2010
- Buenoa antigone (Kirkaldy, 1899)
- Buenoa arida Truxal, 1953
- Buenoa arizonis Bare, 1928
- Buenoa artafrons Truxal, 1953
- Buenoa burtsa Padilla-Gil, 2010
- Buenoa communis Truxal, 1953
- Buenoa confusa Truxal, 1953
- Buenoa crassipes (Champion, 1901)
- Buenoa dactylis Padilla-Gil, 2010
- Buenoa deplanatylus Barbosa & Nessimian, 2013
- Buenoa dilaticrus Barbosa, Nessimian & Ferreira-Keppler, 2010
- Buenoa distincta Truxal, 1953
- Buenoa elegans (Fieber, 1851)
- Buenoa excavata Truxal, 1953
- Buenoa exilidens Barbosa, Nessimian & Ferreira-Keppler, 2010
- Buenoa fasciata Nieser, 1970
- Buenoa femoralis (Fieber, 1851)
- Buenoa fittkaul Nieser, 1970
- Buenoa funensis Padilla-Gil, 2010
- Buenoa fuscipennis (Berg, 1879)
- Buenoa gracilis Truxal, 1953
- Buenoa hungerfordi Truxal, 1953
- Buenoa ida Kirkaldy, 1904
- Buenoa incompta Truxal, 1953
- Buenoa konta Nieser & Pelli, 1994
- Buenoa limnocastoris Hungerford, 1923
- Buenoa machrisi Truxal, 1957
- Buenoa macrophthalma (Fieber, 1851)
- Buenoa macrotibialis Hungerford, 1924
- Buenoa macrotrichia Truxal, 1953
- Buenoa marki Reichart, 1971
- Buenoa margaritacea Torre-Bueno, 1908
- Buenoa mutabilis Truxal, 1953
- Buenoa nieseri Padilla-Gil, 2003
- Buenoa nitida Truxal, 1953 (Synonym: Buenoa doesburgi Nieser, 1968)
- Buenoa oculata Truxal, 1953
- Buenoa omeri Truxal, 1953
- Buenoa oreia Nieser, Melo, Pelli & Barbosa, 1997
- Buenoa pallens (Champion, 1901)
- Buenoa pallipes (Fabricius, 1803)
- Buenoa paranensis Jaczewski, 1928
- Buenoa penta Padilla-Gil, 2012
- Buenoa platycnemis (Fieber, 1851)
- Buenoa prosthetus Padilla-Gil, 2010
- Buenoa pseudomutabilis Barbosa, Ribeiro & Nessimian, 2010
- Buenoa rostra Truxal, 1953
- Buenoa salutis Kirkaldy, 1904
- Buenoa scimitra Bare, 1925
- Buenoa serrana Angrisano, 1983
- Buenoa speciosa Truxal, 1953
- Buenoa tarsalis Truxal, 1953
- Buenoa thomasi Truxal, 1953
- Buenoa tibialis Truxal, 1957
- Buenoa triangularis Truxal, 1957
- Buenoa truxali Nieser, 1968
- Buenoa tumaquensis Padilla-Gil, 2010
- Buenoa uhleri Truxal, 1953
- Buenoa unguis Truxal, 1953
- Buenoa uselus Padilla-Gil, 2010
