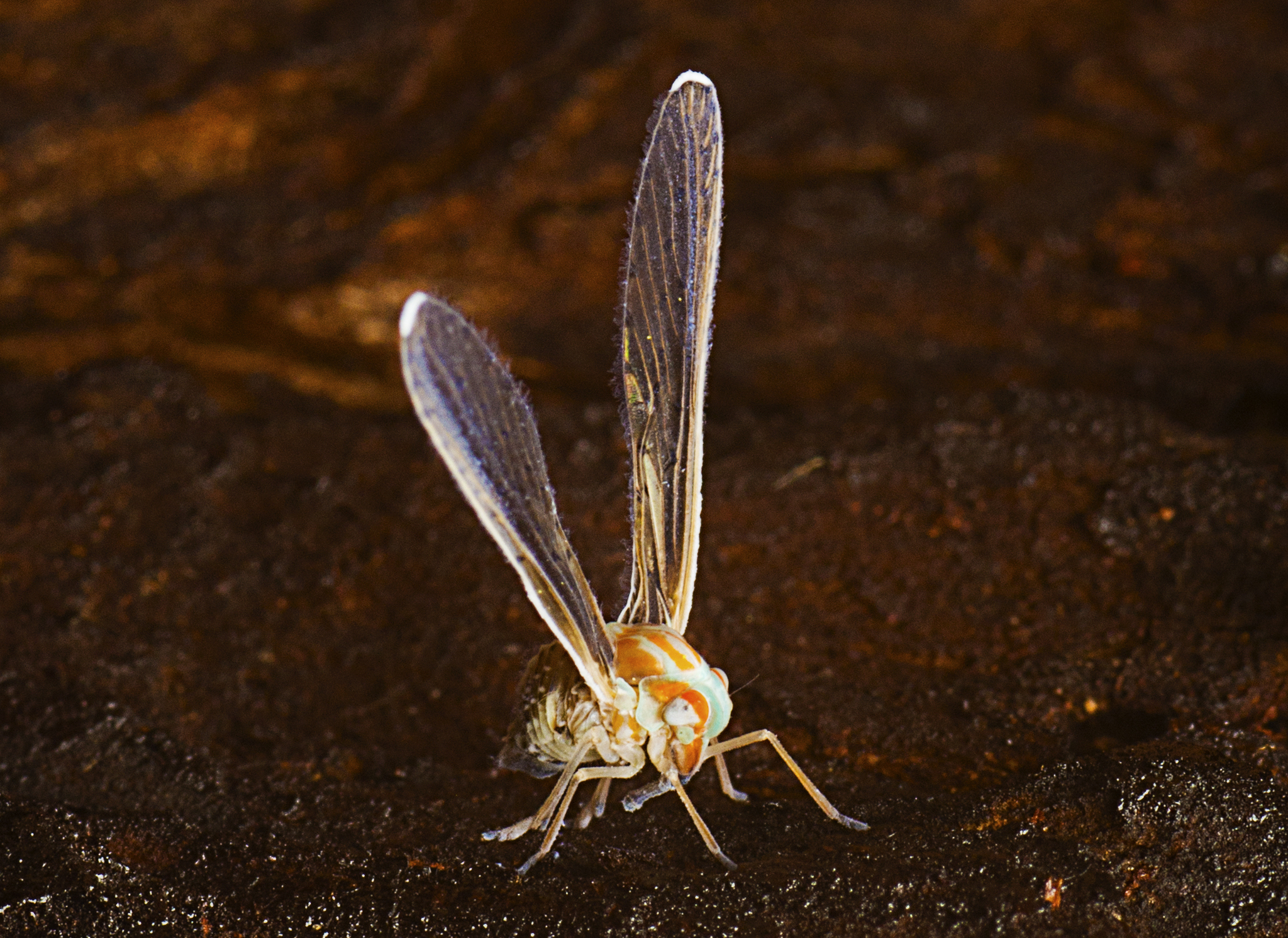
- A species of Lydda, probably Lydda elongata

Scientific classification
- Kingdom: Animalia
- Phylum: Arthropoda
- Clade: Pancrustacea
- Class: Insecta
- Order: Hemiptera
- Suborder: Auchenorrhyncha
- Infraorder: Fulgoromorpha
- Family: Derbidae
- Subfamily: Otiocerinae
- Tribe: Zoraidini
- Genus: Lydda; Westwood, 1840

Synonyms
- Diospolis Westwood, 1841; Philadelpheia Kirkaldy, 1906; Arfaka Distant, 1907; Afakia Kirkaldy, 1909

= Lydda (planthopper) =

Genus of planthoppers

Lydda is a genus of planthoppers from the family Derbidae, tribe Zoraidini, with 21 species, as of 2024. The known distribution range of its species is restricted to parts of Queensland and the Northern Territory in Australia, to the island of New Guinea and to the island of Larat in south-eastern Indonesia. The type species, Lydda elongata (Fabricius 1781), is mainly found in parts of Queensland and in New Guinea. In the past, the genus was often confused with the genus Proutista and a number of Lydda species have been originally described under Proutista. While species of Lydda and Proutista share a similar club-shaped outline of their forewings and a similar wing venation, there are significant differences between both genera in the forewing venation and the structure of the aedeagus in males. On the forewings, the media vein has only 5 branches, while Proutista species have 6 branches. In the type species, Lydda elongata, the eyes are unusually large and the head is very broad. The hind wings are about half as long as the forewings. Some species of Lydda have elaborate patterns on their body and forewings. For example, in live specimens of Lydda elongata, the body has a mixture of reddish brown and bluish patterns, while the forewings are brownish with darker spots. Species that have been previously described under the genus Lydda in Africa are now assigned to the genus Lyddastrombus.

Type species: Cicada elongata Fabricius 1781, a synonym of Lydda elongata

== Distribution ==
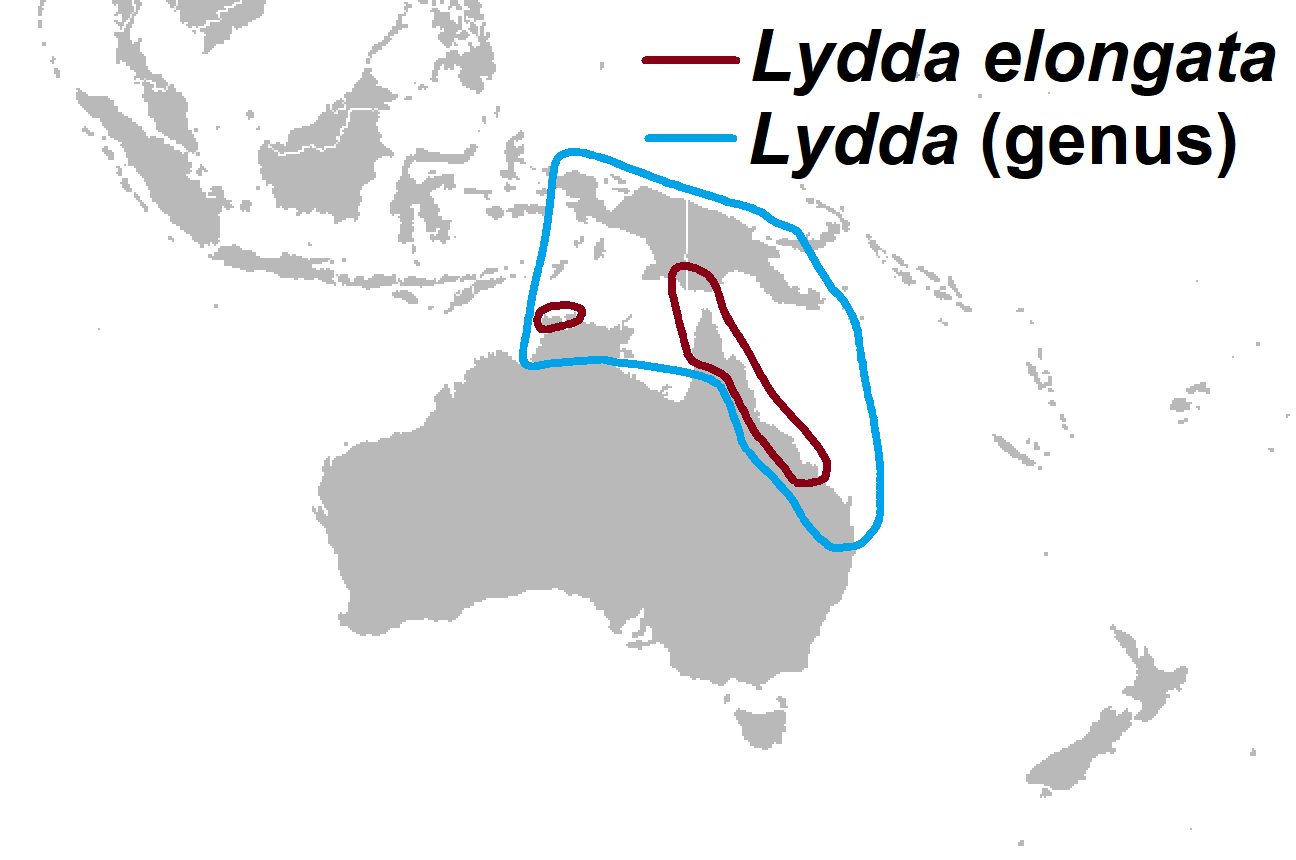
Distribution ranges of the species in the genus Lydda (blue outline) and that of Lydda elongata, the type species (brown outline)

The species of the genus Lydda live in tropical rainforests of north-eastern Australia (some areas in the states of Queensland and the Northern Territory), in all parts of the island of New Guinea (Papua New Guinea and several Indonesian provinces), as well as on the Indonesian island of Larat south of the island of New Guinea. The type species, Lydda elongata, is found mainly in some areas of Queensland, Australia and in some parts of New Guinea. There are additional small, isolated pockets in the Northern Territory of Australia, north of the city of Darwin. While most species of Lydda have a restricted distribution, a few species are more widely distributed. For example, the species Lydda lumholtzi has been recorded from different parts of the island of New Guinea as well as from some areas in northern Australia (Queensland and Northern Territory). Previous distribution records of Lydda species in Africa refer to species now assigned to the genus Lyddastrombus.

== Description ==
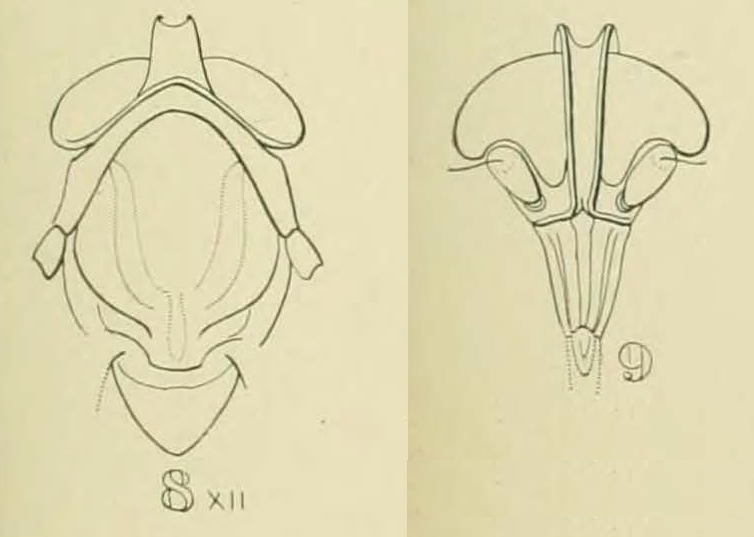
Head and thorax of Lydda elongata. Left: dorsal view of head and thorax, right: frontal view of head. These are the original drawings by Kirkaldy of Philadelpheia pandani, a synonym of Lydda elongata

The genus Lydda is similar in appearance to the genus Proutista. Both genera have been frequently confused in the past and various species of Lydda have been originally described as species of Proutista. Lydda species can be recognized by a combination of different characters of which the forewing venation and the structure of the aedeagus of males is regarded as most significant. In Lydda elongata, the type species, the head with the eyes is almost as broad as the pronotum in dorsal view, a character which was previously considered to be significant. However, in other species, the head is less broad. The face (frons) of Lydda species is narrow with the ridges on its sides running approximately parallel to each other. In side view, the head has a flat profile. The antennae are short. On the hind legs, the tibia has small lateral spines. The body from the tip of the head to the end of the abdomen is 3–4 mm long.

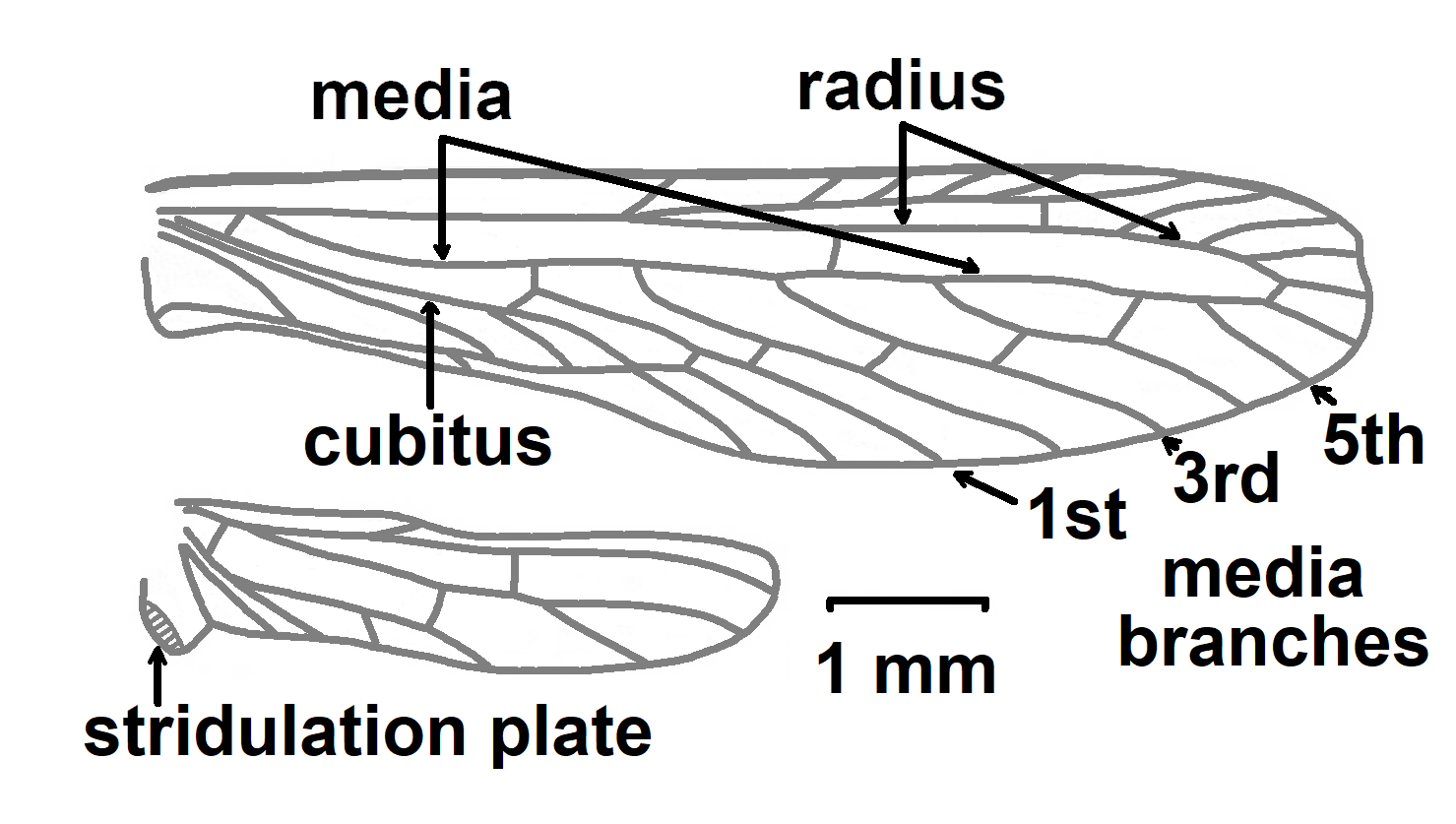
Shape and venation of forewing (top) and hind wing (bottom) of Lydda elongata, the type species of the genus Lydda

The forewings are between 6½ and 8½ mm long, while the hind wings are slightly less than half as long as the forewings. The shape of the forewings resembles that of the species of Proutista. Their outline is often club-shaped with the basal third being narrow and the distal part being unusually broad. The venation of the forewings is also similar to that in the genus Proutista with none of the media branches forking further into sub branches. However, among other differences, there are only 5 branches of the media vein in Lydda compared to 6 in Proutista. Similar to the genus Proutista, live specimens of the genus Lydda raise their wings above the body and spread them out at an angle of about 60°.

Lydda species can have elaborate patterns on head and thorax and can be rather colourful. In live specimens of Lydda elongata, the type species, the dorsal parts of head and thorax are partly reddish brown and partly bluish (see image in the taxobox). The face, the facial ridges and the antennae are light blue, as is the central part of the pronotum. These bluish parts are lined with broad, reddish brown stripes and the sides of the head and the pronotum are also partly bluish and partly reddish brown. The mesonotum is reddish brown with bluish longitudinal stripes and the forewings are brownish with darker spots. In Lydda lumholtzi, the forewings are checkered. The thorax is mainly brown with a whitish, trident-shaped mark on the mesonotum.

== Biology ==
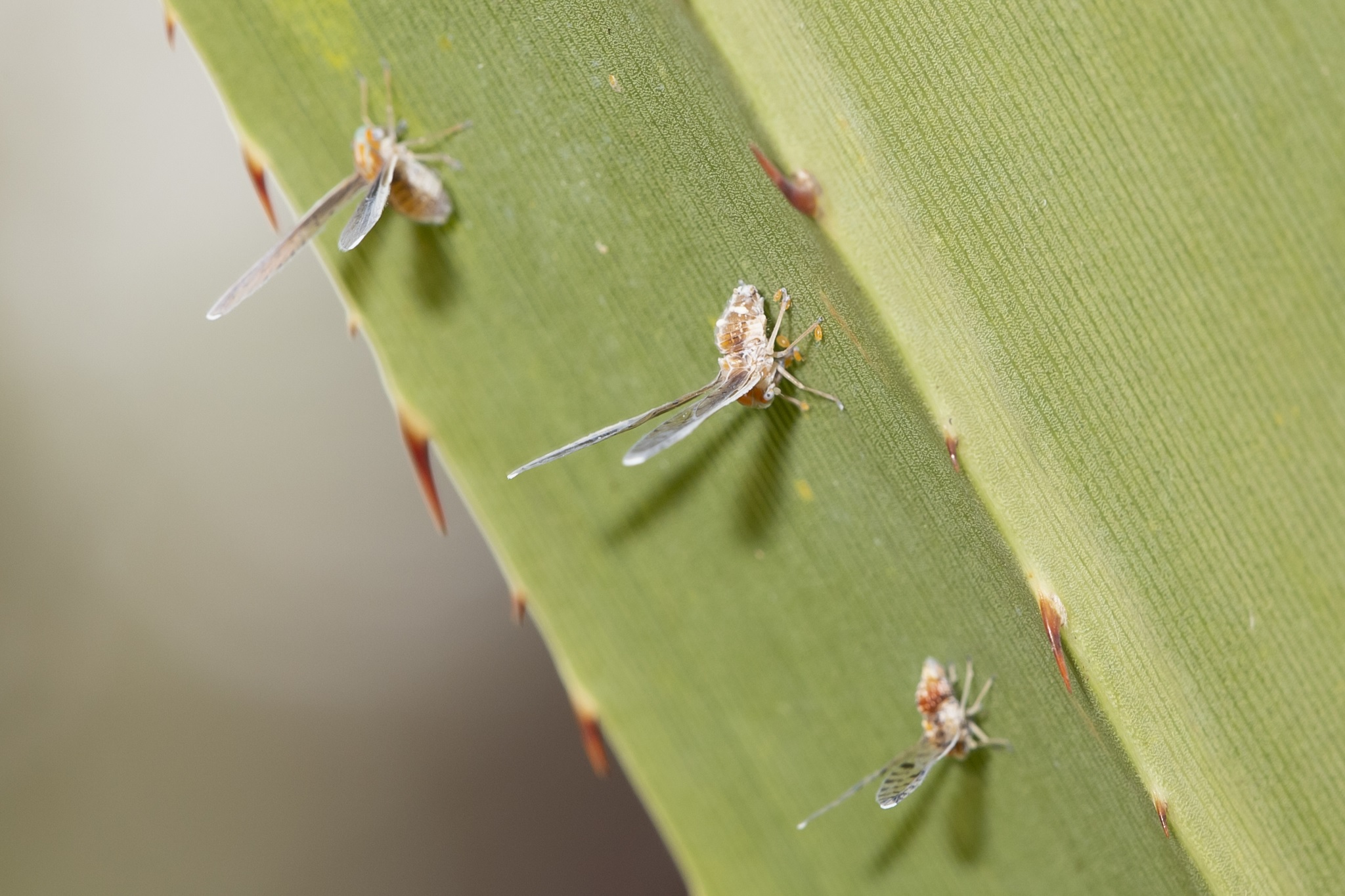
Group of Lydda elongata hoppers feeding on a leaf

There is no information on the biology of the nymphal stages of Lydda species. However, it can be assumed that they live in decaying organic matter like other derbids, feeding on fungi. Like for many other derbids, the host plants of the adult hoppers are mainly monocots and include bananas, sugar cane, maize and palm trees. Lydda gressitti and Lydda lurida have been recorded from various host plants in New Guinea, and Lydda elongata has been reported on screw palms (Pandanus) and sugar cane. While the internet contains images of 10 or more insects from the genus Lydda feeding on a leaf, Lydda species are not regarded as harmful to their host plants and most species are rare with a very restricted geographic distribution range.

== Taxonomy and species ==
Westwood described the genus Lydda in 1840 with the type species Derbe elongata from New Holland (Australia), a species originally described by Fabricius in 1781 as Cicada elongata. However, a year later Westwood renamed Lydda as Diospolis. Although the name Diospolis was subsequently used by various authors, the name Lydda is now accepted, based on the priority of the older name. In his descriptions, Westwood did not explain the origin of the names Lydda and Diospolis and why he renamed Lydda as Diospolis. There could be a relationship between these names and the city Lod in Israel, since "Lydda" is the ancient Greek name for that city and "Diospolis" is its name used during the Roman Empire ("Lod" is the Hebrew name).

In 1906, Kirkaldy described the genus Philadelpheia with the type species Philadelpheia pandani from Cairns, Queensland in Australia. However, in 1918, Muir regarded Philadelpheia pandani to be a synonym of Diospolis elongata and therefore Philadelpheia to be a synonym for Diospolis. Philadelpheia is now accepted as a synonym of Lydda and Philadelpheia pandani as a synonym of Lydda elongata (Fabricius, 1781).

In 1907, Distant described the genus Arfaka with the type species Arfaka decida from New Guinea. In 1909, Kirkaldy renamed Arfaka to Afakia, assuming Distant's name was a misspelling for the village "Afaka" in New Guinea. In 1910, Distant clarified that Arfaka was named after the "Arfak" mountains in New Guinea, not after a village. However, he accepted Kirkaldy's new name because the name Arfaka was preoccupied by a genus of Cicadidae. In 1918, Muir regarded both genera Arfaka and Afakia as synonyms of Proutista, but since 1992 they are regarded as synonyms of Lydda.

During a taxonomic revision and a re-description of the genus Lydda in 1992, seven species, described and assigned to Lydda in Africa, were transferred to a new taxon, Diostrombus subgenus Lyddastrombus, with the type species Diospolis annetti Muir, 1918 (= Lydda annetti). Lyddastrombus is now regarded as a full genus, separate from Diostrombus. The removal of the African species from the genus restricts the distribution range of the genus to New Guinea and northern Australia.

The genus Lydda has 21 recognized species as of 2024. None of them seems to be particular common or widespread. The following 6 species have been observed or listed slightly more often, as per Google Scholar and other sources:

- Lydda elongata (Fabricius, 1781)
- Lydda gressitti (Van Stalle, 1990)
- Lydda lumholtzi (Kirkaldy, 1907)
- Lydda lurida (Muir, 1913)
- Lydda lutea (Muir, 1913)
- Lydda sacchari (Van Stalle, 1986)
