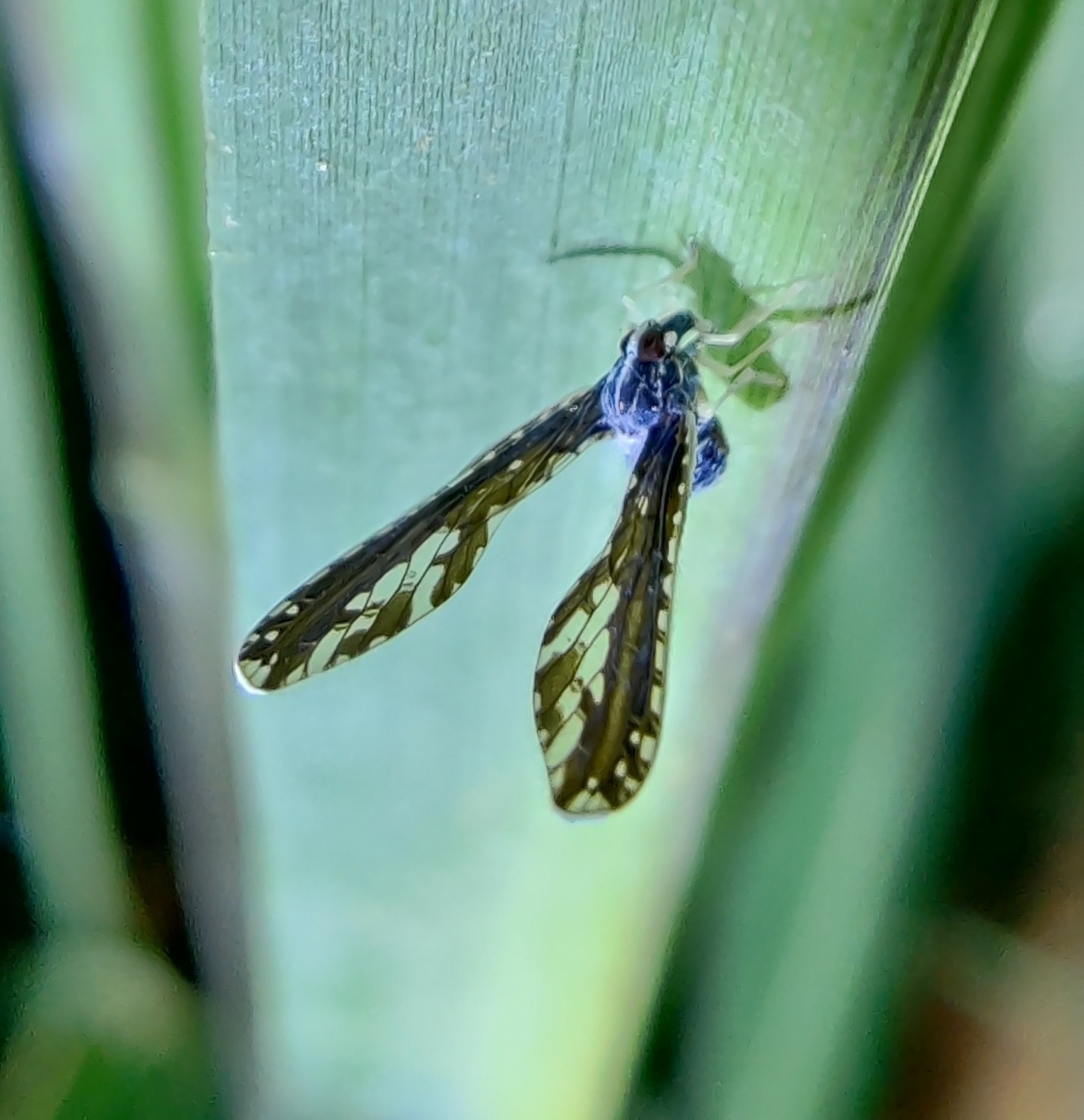
- Proutista moesta

Scientific classification
- Kingdom: Animalia
- Phylum: Arthropoda
- Class: Insecta
- Order: Hemiptera
- Suborder: Auchenorrhyncha
- Infraorder: Fulgoromorpha
- Family: Derbidae
- Subfamily: Otiocerinae
- Tribe: Zoraidini
- Genus: Proutista; Kirkaldy, 1904

Synonyms
- Assamia Buckton, 1896; Sardis Kirkaldy, 1906

= Proutista =

Genus of planthoppers

Proutista is a small genus of planthoppers from the family Derbidae, tribe Zoraidini, with 10 species, as of 2024. The type species, Proutista moesta is widely distributed and often very common, its distribution ranging from Tanzania in Africa, over some Indian Ocean islands (Seychelles, Maldives) and southern parts of western Asia (India, Sri Lanka) to far eastern Asia (China, Taiwan, Japan) and parts of the western Pacific (Philippines, Guam, Palau, Indonesia, Papua New Guinea). Seven of the remaining species are also found in tropical parts of Asia and only two additional species have been recorded from Africa, where Proutista fritillaris is the most common one. The species of Proutista are characterized by a combination of different features, mainly the shape and venation of the forewings, the size of the hind wings and the structure of the head and the antennae. On the forewings the media vein has 6 branches, none of them branching further into sub branches. The hind wings are about half as long as the forewings and have a rounded tip. The head has a narrow face (frons) and the antennae are rather short, much shorter than the face.

Type species: Assamia dentata Buckton, 1896, a synonym of Proutista moesta (Westwood, 1851)

== Distribution ==
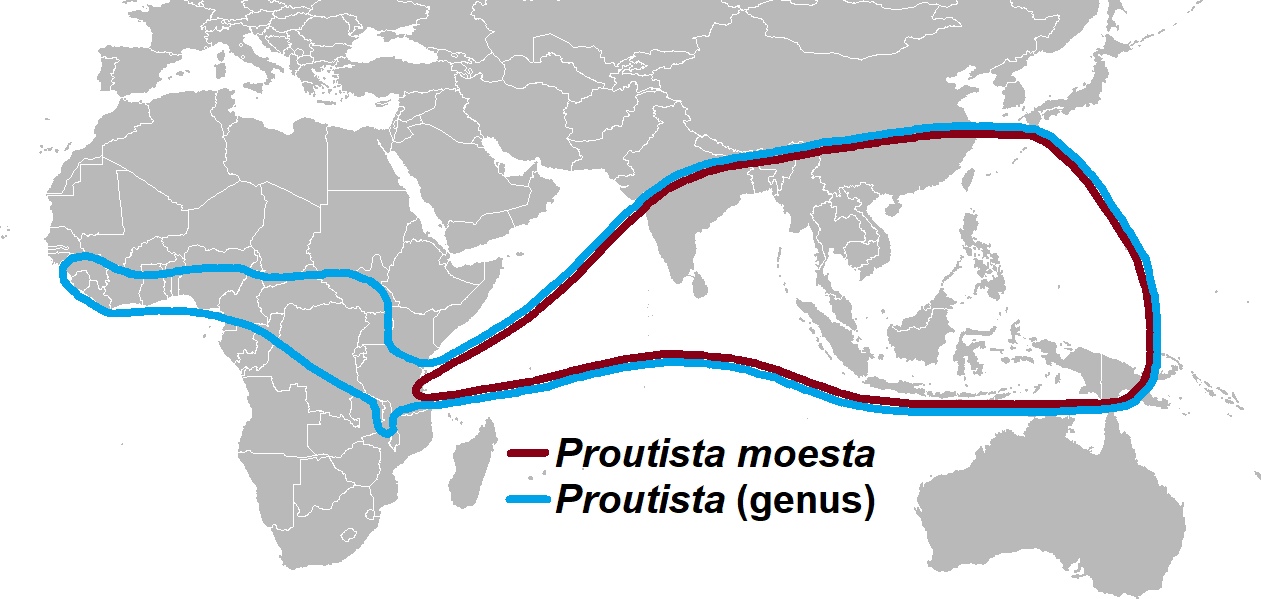
Distribution ranges of the species in the genus Proutista (blue outline) and that of Proutista moesta, the type species (brown outline)

Species of the genus Proutista are found in tropical parts of Africa, Asia and the western Pacific, as well as in some subtropical parts of eastern Asia. The distribution of Proutista moesta, the type species ranges from Tanzania in eastern Africa over the Seychelles and the Maldives in the India Ocean to India and Sri Lanka. The only record from Africa possibly represents a new introduction. Further east, Proutista moesta has been reported from southern parts of mainland Asia (Bangladesh, Malaysia, Thailand, Vietnam, China) and from various islands in western parts of the Pacific, including Indonesia, the Philippines, Taiwan, Japan, Guam, Palau and New Guinea. Apart from Proutista moesta, 7 other species of Proutista have been described from Asia and the western Pacific, but none of them is common. Only two additional species are known from Africa, with Proutista fritillaris being common and widespread in tropical parts of western Africa (Sierra Leone, Guinea, Togo, Ivory Coast, Central African Republic, Cameroon, Nigeria, Democratic Republic of the Congo) and some parts of eastern Africa (Malawi, Uganda, "Sudan", Tanzania).

== Description ==
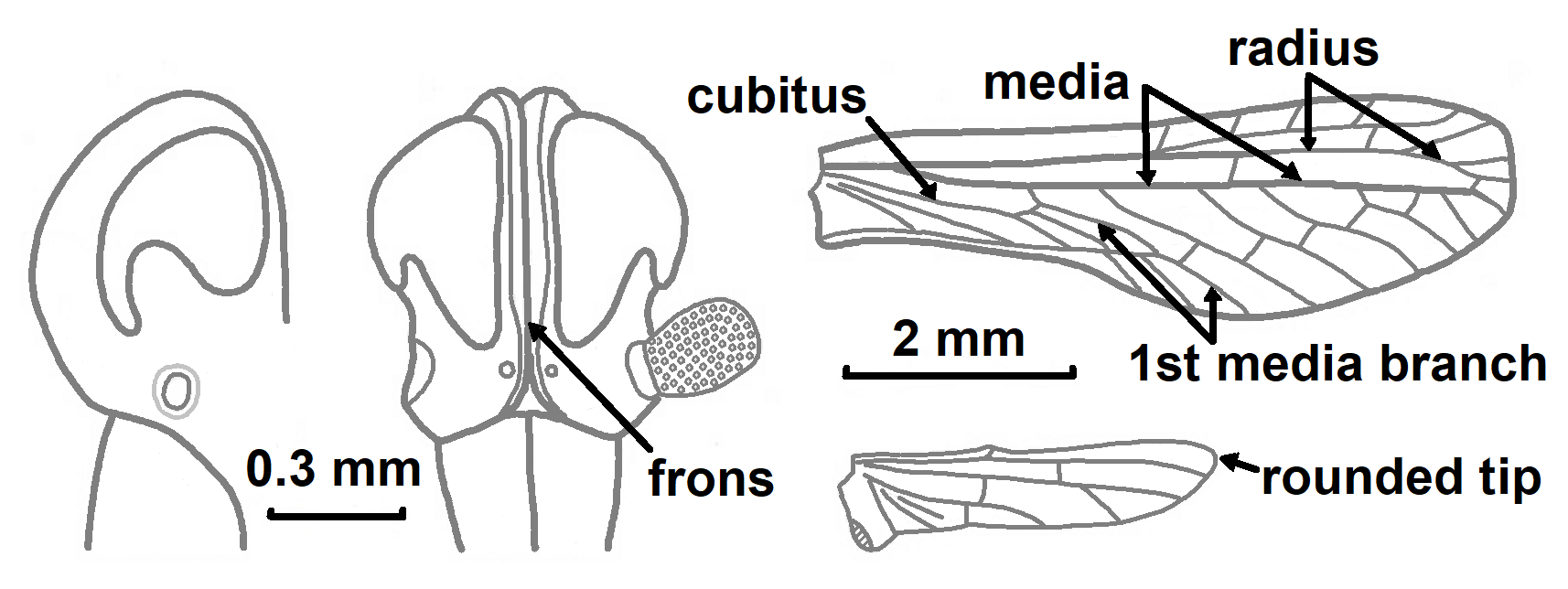
Head and wings of Proutista moesta. Left: head in profile and frontal view. Right: forewing venation (top) and hind wing venation (botton)

Species of Proutista can be recognized by a combination of different characters:

- On the forewings, the media vein has 6 branches with none of them forking further into sub branches.
- The hind wings are about half as long as the forewings and have a rounded tip.
- The head is much narrower than the thorax, has a narrow face (frons), a flat profile, 2 ocelli and short antennae with the last antennal segment less than twice as long as wide.
- The forewings often have a club-shaped outline with the basal third being unusually narrow and the distal part being unusually broad.

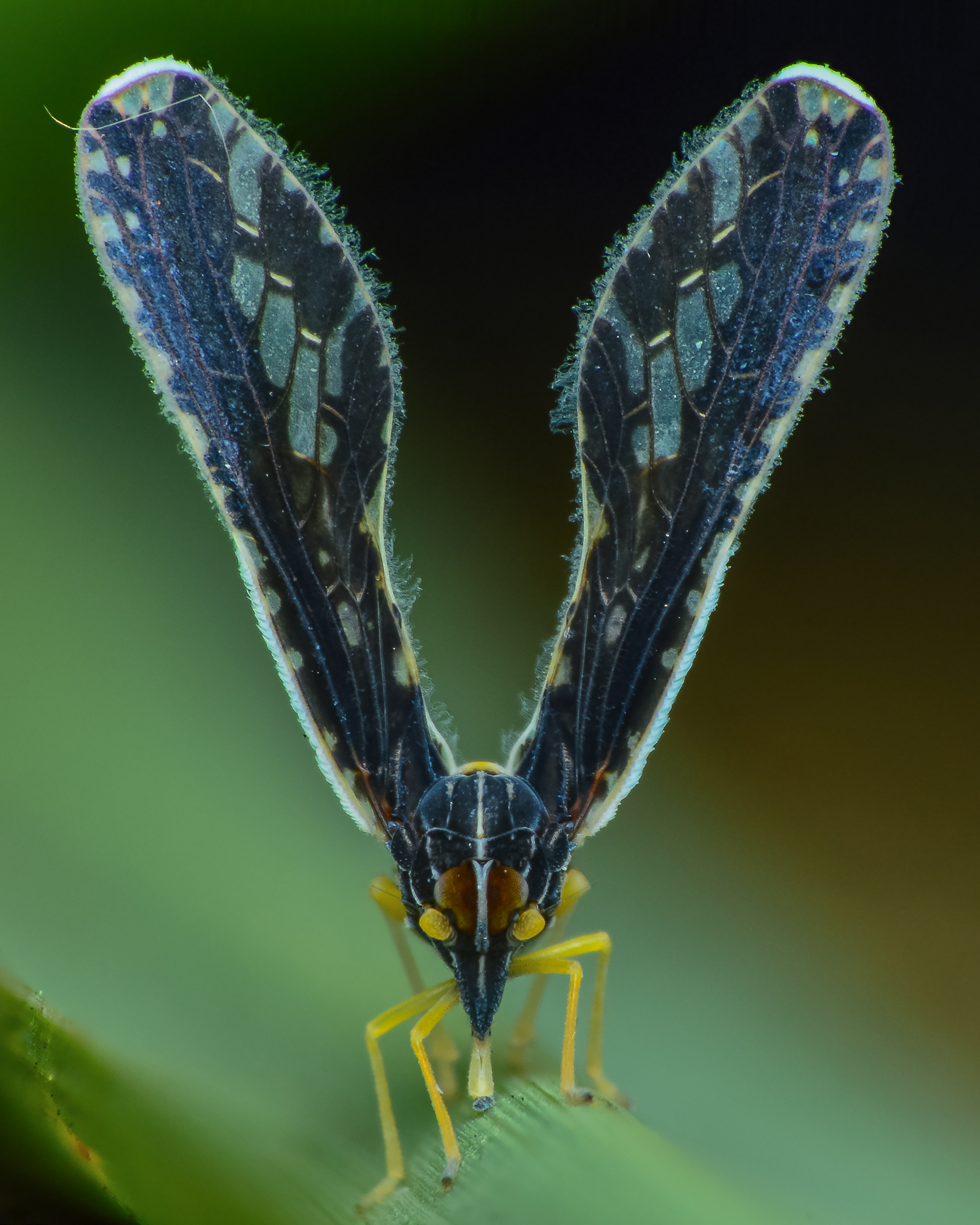
Proutista moesta in frontal view

Compared to other genera of the tribe Zoraidini, species of Proutista are small. The body from head to the end of the abdomen is around 2.5 to 3.0 mm long and the forewings have a length of 6 to 8 mm. Males are smaller than females. The two most common species, Proutista moesta in Asia and Proutista fritillaris in Africa are predominantly black with the legs and some parts of the body straw-coloured. The wings are also mainly black, interrupted by light patches which can give them a checkered appearance. However, other species like Proutista wilemani from Taiwan or Proutista javensis from Java are lighter. Available images of live specimens (Proutista moesta and P. fritillaris) suggest that when Proutista species are at rest, their forewings are raised above the body and spread out at an angle of about 60°.

== Biology and impact ==
In general, immature stages of insects from the family Derbidae are associated with decaying organic matter like rotting wood, where they feed on fungi. For species of Proutista, information on their breeding habitats is rare, but immatures of Proutista moesta have been reported from oil palm bunch waste. The adults of Proutista moesta have been recorded from a number of different host plants with palm trees like coconut and oil palms being cited most often. However, sugarcane and maize have also been reported as hosts.

Proutista moesta can be very common and is often cited as an agricultural pest of oil palms and sugarcane. It is also regarded as a vector of coconut diseases causes by phytoplasmas, based on the presence of the disease agents inside the insects. In Australia, it is regarded as a biosecurity risk. However, there does not seem to be any information on the direct effects the feeding activities of the insect has on growth or yield of the host plants.

== Taxonomy and species ==
The genus Proutista was original described by Buckton in 1896 as Assamia with the type species Assamia dentata from Assam, India. In 1903, Melichar stated that Assamia dentata is a synonym of Derbe (Phenice) moesta Westwood, 1851 which had been described from "India orientali". In 1904, Kirkaldy renamed Assamia Buckton as Proutista, since the name Assamia was preoccupied.

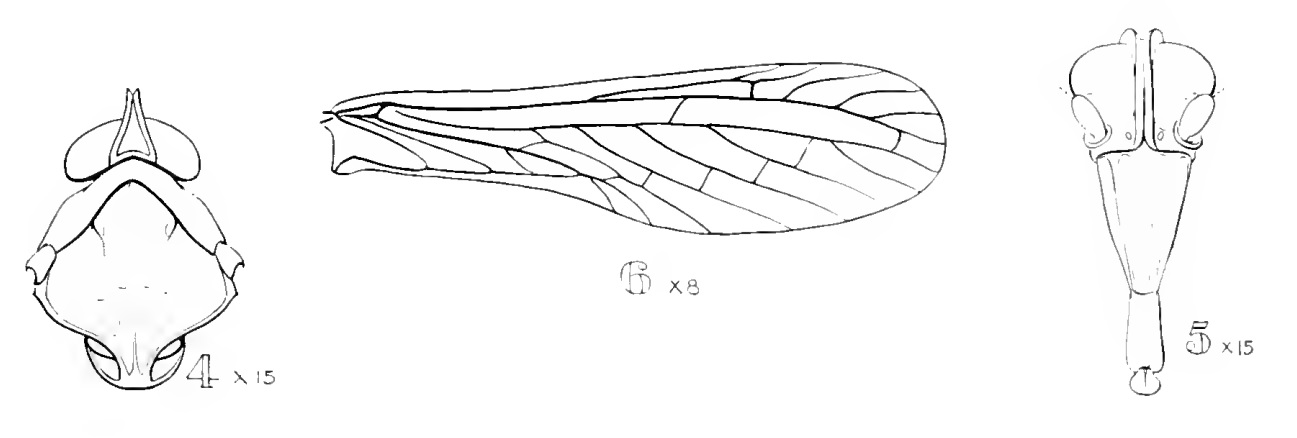
Original illustrations by G.W. Kirkaldy of an insect from Queensland, Australia which he believed was Phenice maculosa Krueger 1897, but later named Proutista lumholtzi (now a synonym of Lydda kumholtzi)

In 1906, Kirkaldy described a new genus which he named Sardis, with Phenice maculosa Krueger, 1897 from Java, Indonesia as the type species. As part of this description he also described and illustrated an insect from Queensland, Australia which he believed to be Phenice maculosa, but stating that he had not seen Krueger's "original work". One year later, he realized that the described and illustrated specimen from Australia was not Phenice maculosa and that:

- Phenice maculoca Krueger, 1897 is a synonym of Proutista moesta Westwood, 1851.
- The genus Sardis is consequently a synonym of Proutista.
- The specimen from Australia he described and illustrated as Phenice maculoca is a different species which he named Proutista lumholtzi. This species is now known as Lydda lumholtzi (Kirkaldy, 1907).

The following 3 genera in the tribe Zoraidini are most similar to the genus Proutista, among others they all have a similar appearance, wing shape and wing venation:

- Shizuka Matsumura, 1914, a small genus in eastern Asia, which differs from Proutista mainly by its longer antennae and the course of the cubitus vein on the forewing.
- Lydda Westwood, 1840 which has a wider head, about as wide as the thorax, and shorter hind wings.
- Diostrombus Uhler, 1896 which differs by the hind wings being shorter and having a pointed tip.

Currently (2024), 10 species are placed in the genus Proutista. The most common ones are:

- Proutista fritillaris (Boheman 1838)
- Proutista furcatovittata (Stål, 1855)
- Proutista moesta (Westwood, 1851)
