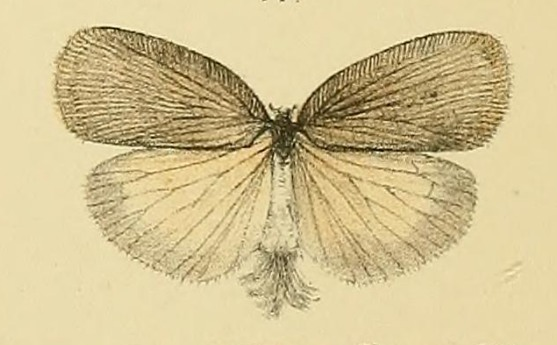
- Illustration by William Forsell Kirby

Scientific classification
- Kingdom: Animalia
- Phylum: Arthropoda
- Clade: Pancrustacea
- Class: Insecta
- Order: Hemiptera
- Suborder: Auchenorrhyncha
- Infraorder: Fulgoromorpha
- Family: Flatidae
- Genus: Adelidoria
- Species: A. glauca

Binomial name
- Adelidoria glauca (Kirby, 1891)

Synonyms
- Hansenia glauca Kirkaldy, 1903; Hansenia kirbyi Melichar, 1901; Poeciloptera glauca William Forsell Kirby, 1891

= Adelidoria glauca =

Species of insect

Adelidoria glauca is an insect species from Sri Lanka that was first described by William Forsell Kirby in 1891. It is the only species of the genus Adelidoria, which is related to the genus Cerynia, but differs in the neuration, etc.

== Description ==
According to Distant, length excluding tegmina 9 to 10 mm; including tegmina 33 to 35 mm. According to Kirby it is 27–31 mm long. Tegmina are pale bluish grey, hind marginal area is paler; hind wings are more grey and iridescent. Body white, scutellum and legs black. Abdomen covered with white feathery waxy excrescences. The frons is longitudinally convex, genae anteriorly rotundate, neither frons nor genae produced in the middle. Ocelli distinct. Antennae: segments of the peduncle elongate, first extending considerably beyond the lateral margins of the genae, second about one-fifth longer than the first. Tegmina are very greatly decumbent, very ample, sensibly widened towards the apex, rotundate, with a single regular series of transverse nervures towards the apex; corium, etc. (except at the base) with numerous transverse nervures; many of the longitudinal nervures furcate. Costal membrane dilated, basally narrowed more than twice as long in the middle as the costal area. Posterior tibiae with one spine. Abdomen compressed.

== Biology and behavior ==
It sometimes covers the leaves of Syzygium trees upon which the larva feeds. When disturbed, it flies away in clouds.

== Distribution ==
It is only known from Sri Lanka.
