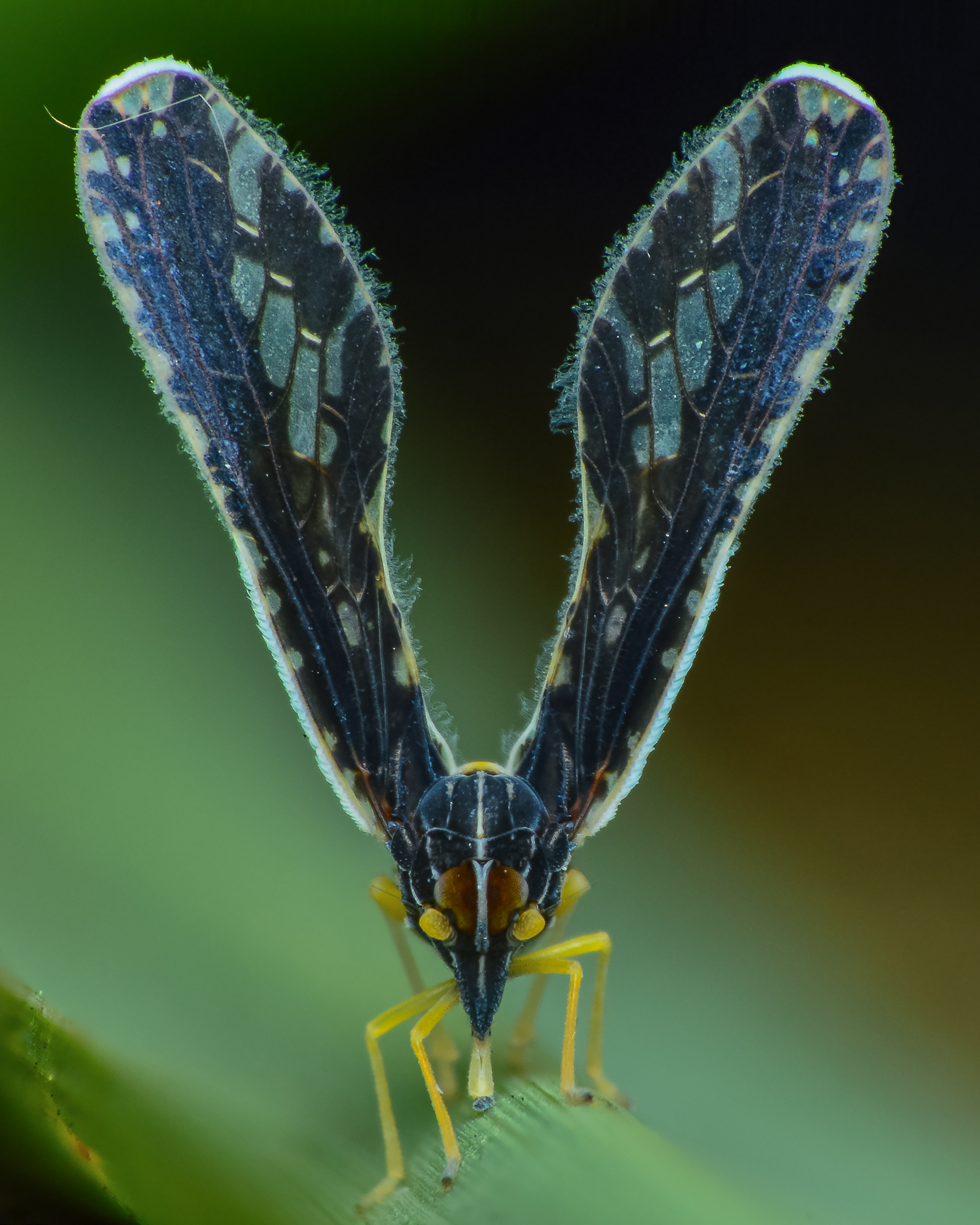
- Frontal view of Proutista moesta

Scientific classification
- Kingdom: Animalia
- Phylum: Arthropoda
- Class: Insecta
- Order: Hemiptera
- Suborder: Auchenorrhyncha
- Infraorder: Fulgoromorpha
- Family: Derbidae
- Genus: Proutista
- Species: P. moesta

Binomial name
- Proutista moesta (Westwood, 1851)

Synonyms
- Derbe (Phenice) moesta Westwood, 1851; Phenice moesta (Westwood, 1851); Thracia albipes Walker, 1870; Assamia dentata Buckton, 1896; Phenice maculosa Krüger, 1897

= Proutista moesta =

Species of planthopper

Proutista moesta is a common species of planthopper from the family Derbidae, tribe Zoraidini. It is found in tropical parts of Asia from India to southern parts of China, some islands in the western Pacific (Taiwan, parts of Japan, Philippines, Guam, parts of Northern Marianas, Palau, parts of the Federated States of Micronesia, Indonesia, Papua New Guinea), as well as in the Indian Ocean (Seychelles, Maldives). There is also a record from eastern Africa, a possible recent introduction. P. moesta can be common on crops like oil palms, coconut palms, sugarcane and several cereals, where it sucks the sap from the plants. It is often regarded as a pest of these crops, a vector of phytoplasma diseases and a biosecurity risk in countries outside its distribution range. Males of P. moesta are smaller (around 6.9 mm) than females (around 7.6 mm) when measured from the tip of the head to the end of the forewings. The forewings alone have a length of around 6.1 mm for males or around 6.6 mm for females. The colour is predominantly black, but the legs, antennae, facial ridges and the rostrum are yellowish to light orange. The ridges on the mesonotum and the clypeus are whitish to light yellow and the body has scattered white dots. The black forewings have some clear patches, mainly along the costal margin and in the distal half between the hind margin and the media vein. When at rest, the insect raises its wings above the body and spreads them out at an angle of about 60°.

== Distribution ==
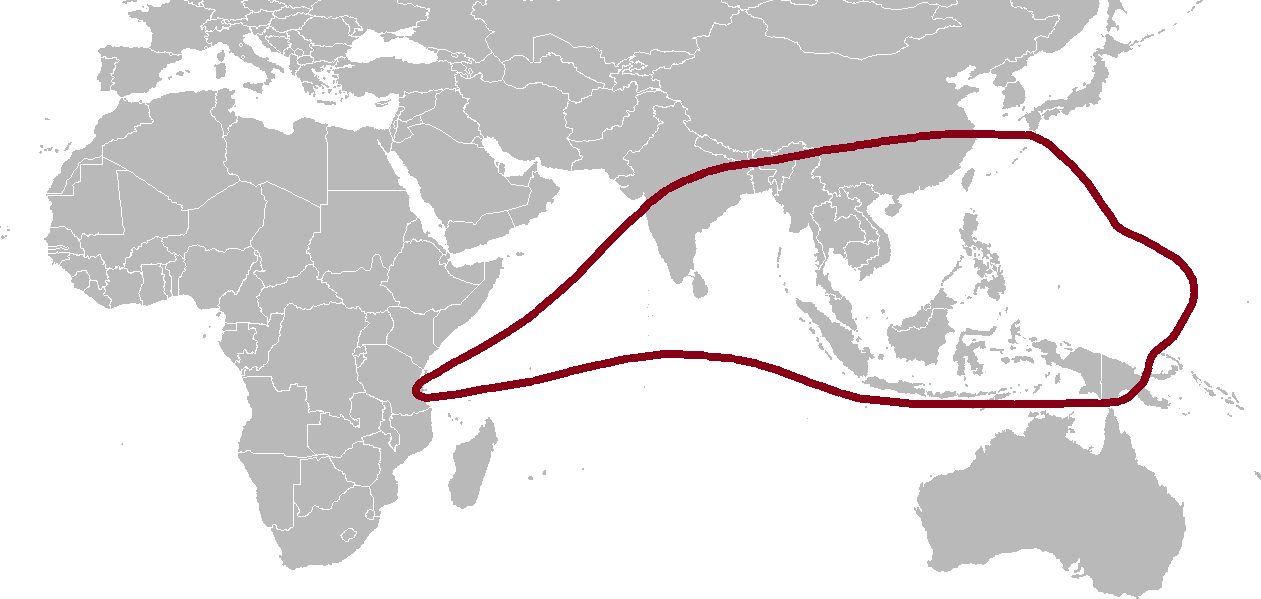
Distribution range of Proutista moesta

Proutista moesta is the most common species in the genus Proutista in Asia. Its distribution ranges from Tanzania in eastern Africa over the Seychelles and the Maldives in the India Ocean to India and Sri Lanka. The only record from Africa possibly represents a new introduction. Further east, Proutista moesta has been reported from southern parts of mainland Asia (Bangladesh, Malaysia, Thailand, Vietnam, southern China) and from various islands in the western parts of the Pacific. These apparently include most parts of Indonesia, the Philippines, Taiwan, Guam, Palau and New Guinea. There are also records from Japan, from parts of the Northern Marianas (Tinian, Rota) and from parts of the Federated States of Micronesia (Losap Atoll, Nomwin Atoll). In his original description, Westwood gives eastern India ("India orientali") as type locality. The type localities of the species which are now regarded as synonyms of P. moesta is Assam (north-eastern India) for Assamia dentata, Flores (Indonesia) for Thracia albipes and Java (Indonesia) for Phenice maculosa.

== Description ==
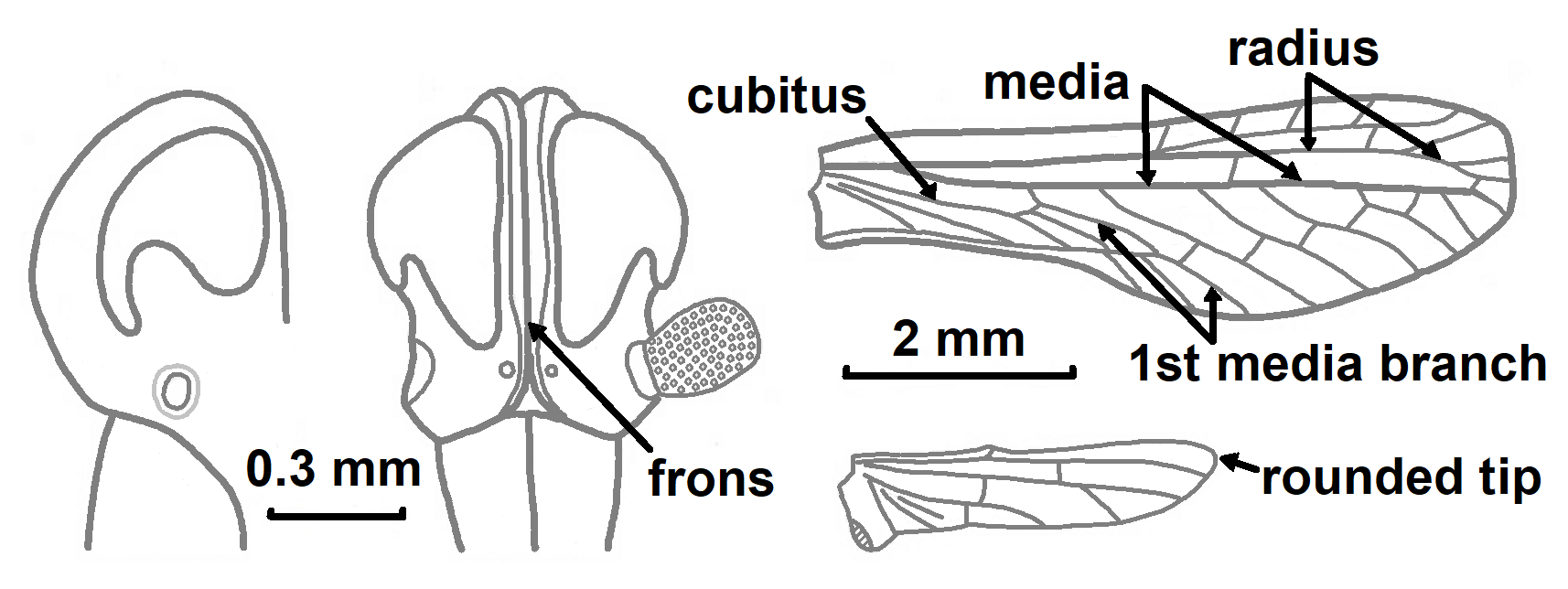
Head and wings of Proutista moesta. Left: head in profile and frontal view. Right: forewing venation (top) and hind wing venation (bottom)

Proutista moesta is one of the smaller species in the genus Proutista. The body from the tip of the head to the end of the abdomen is around 3 mm long and the length of the forewings is about 6 to 6½ mm. Females are on average about 10% larger than males. For example, the size of specimens from Taiwan has been given as 6.8 to 7.0 mm for males and 7.4 to 7.8 mm for females, when measured from the tip of the head to the end of the forewings, with forewings alone having a length of 6.1 to 6.2 mm for males and 6.5 to 6.8 mm for females.

Like in other species of the genus Proutista, the media vein of the forewing has 6 branches which do not fork further into sub branches. The hind wings are about half as long as the forewings and have rounded tips. The forewings have a club-shaped outline with a narrow basal part which widens abruptly to an unusually broad distal part. The face (frons) is narrow and the facial ridges meet in front of the eyes.

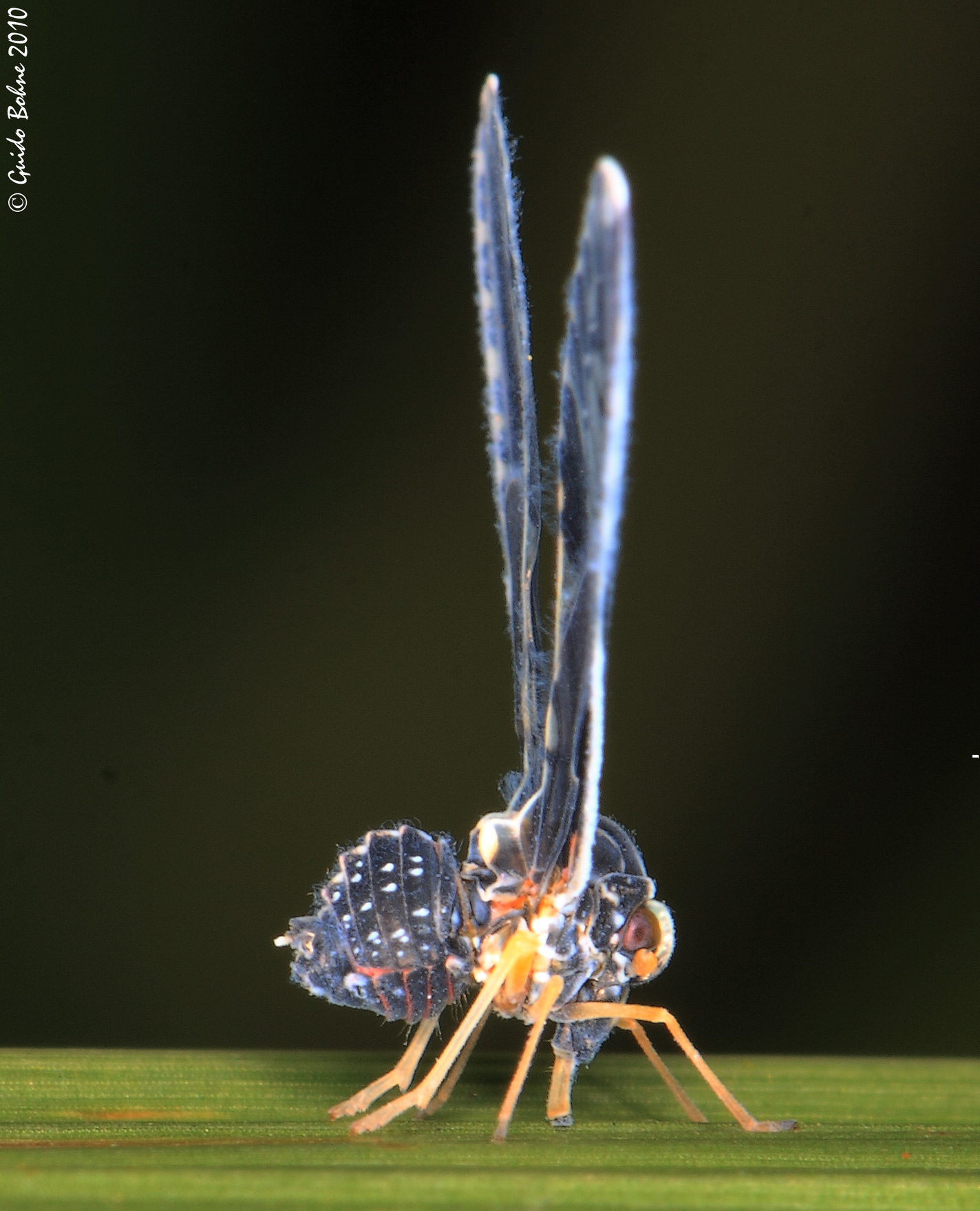
Side view of Proutista moesta

Proutista moesta is predominantly black, except for the legs, the antennae, the upper parts of the facial ridges and the rostrum which are yellowish to light orange. The mesoscutellum and ridges on the mesonotum, on the abdomen and on the clypeus are whitish to light yellow or orange. The abdominal segments have rows of white dots and the rest of the body has also some small scattered white marks. The black forewings have a whitish outer margin, whitish tips and clear patches along the costal margin and in the distal half between the hind margin and the media vein. The hindwings are black with some clear patches along the hind margin. When at rest, P. moesta raises its wings above the body and spreads them out at an angle of about 60°.

== Biology and impact ==
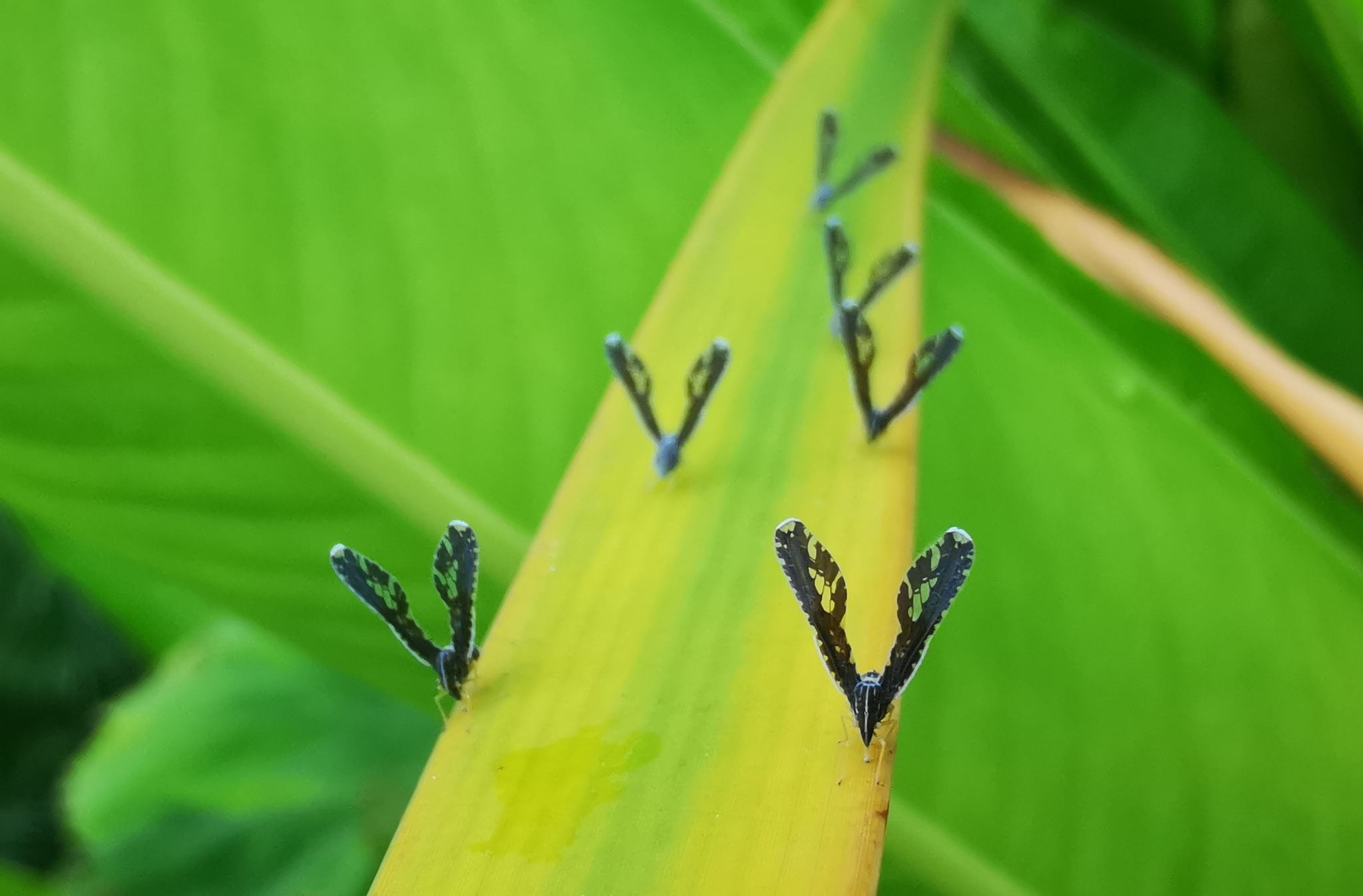
Group of Proutista moesta (Derbidae) feeding on a leaf near Chiang Mai (Thailand) from iNaturalist

Like for other members of the family Derbidae, the immature stages of Proutista moesta have been associated with decaying organic matter and apparently feed on fungi. For example, immature P. moesta have been found in oil palm bunch waste. The adult hoppers feed by sucking the sap from monocots. Palm trees like coconut and oil palms are being cited most often as host plants, but sugarcane and cereals like maize or millet are also hosts.

Proutista moesta can be very common and is often cited as an agricultural pest of oil palms or sugarcane. In Australia, it is regarded as a biosecurity risk, apparently mainly due to its ability to harbour phytoplasma diseases. However, apart from recording the seasonal frequency, there does not seem to be any information on the impact of the insect on the growth or yield of its host plants. Economically more important appears to be the role of P. moesta as a disease vector. This is mainly based on the presence of the disease agents inside the insects. However, a transmission trial also provided evidence that P. moesta is a vector of phytoplasma diseases in coconut palms.

== Taxonomy ==
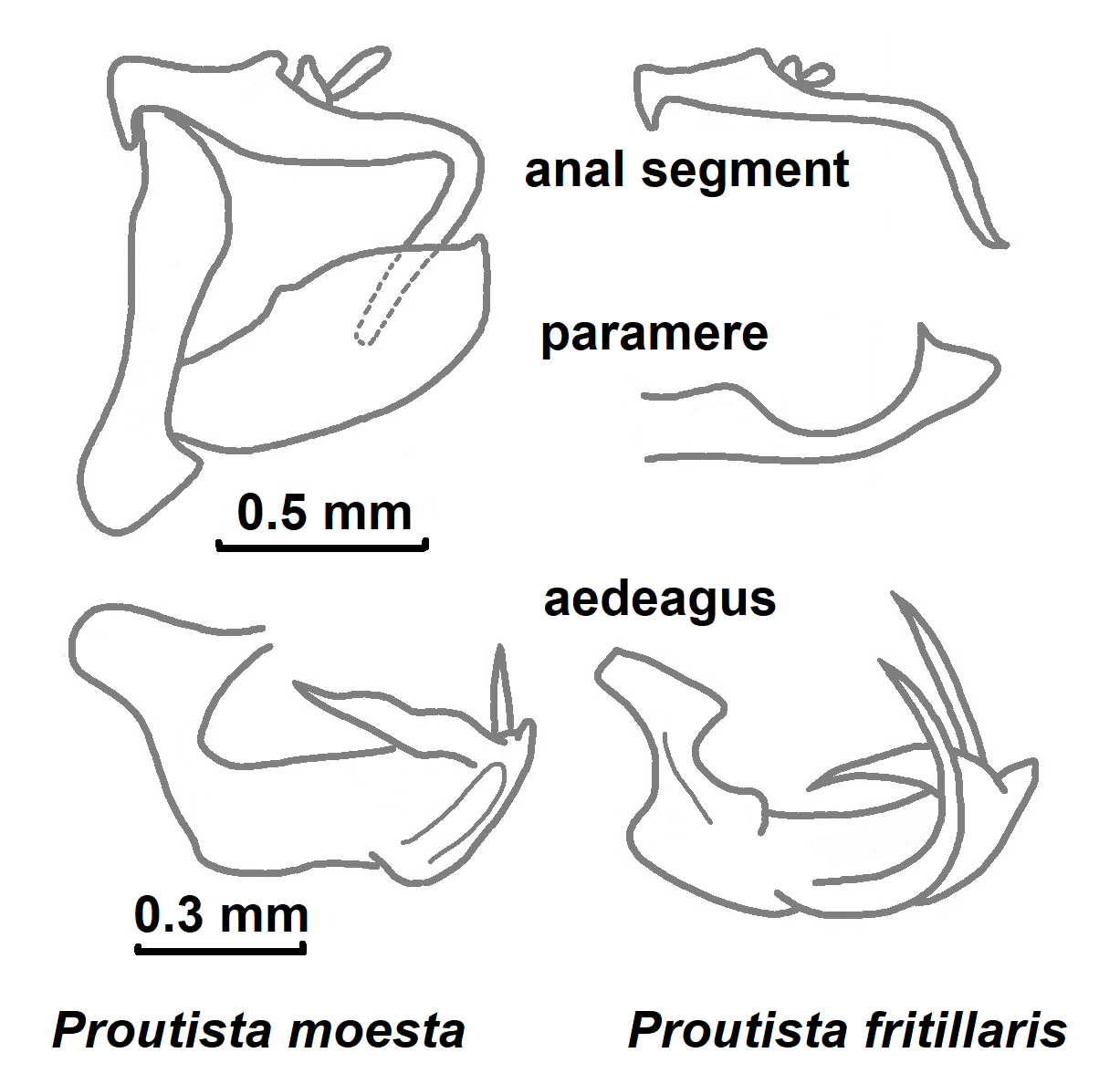
Structures on the tip of the male abdomen in Proutista moesta (left) and Proutista fritillaris (right) showing the anal segment, the left paramere and the aedeagus

Proutista moesta is the type species of the genus Proutista. Compared to the other species in this genus, it is most similar to Proutista fritillaris (Boheman 1838), a species common in tropical parts of Africa. However, it is about 10 to 15% smaller and darker compared to P. fritillaris. Males of both species can be reliably separated by the structure of their abdominal tip, that is the morphology of the anal segment, the parameres and the aedeagi (see the illustration on the right). In P. moesta, the anal segment is more strongly bent down and the parameres are much broader. Further, in P. moesta the aedeagus has a large central process which is directed forward, a pointed process on the right side directed upwards, a small terminal process also directed upwards and a slender plate on the left side, directed backwards and upwards. In contrast, the aedeagus of Proutista fritillaris has three large pointed and slightly curved processes, directed upwards and forward. Especially, the left pointed process of P. fritillaris is missing in P. moesta and replaced by a slender plate. Currently (2024), the distribution of both species only overlaps in Tanzania.
