= Buenoa margaritacea =

Scientific classification
- Kingdom: Animalia
- Phylum: Arthropoda
- Clade: Pancrustacea
- Class: Insecta
- Order: Hemiptera
- Suborder: Heteroptera
- Family: Notonectidae
- Genus: Buenoa
- Species: B. margaritacea

Binomial name
- Buenoa margaritacea Torre-Bueno, 1908

Species of true bug

Buenoa margaritacea is a species of backswimmer in the family Notonectidae. It is found in Central America and North America.
