= Buenoa dactylis =

Scientific classification
- Kingdom: Animalia
- Phylum: Arthropoda
- Clade: Pancrustacea
- Class: Insecta
- Order: Hemiptera
- Suborder: Heteroptera
- Family: Notonectidae
- Genus: Buenoa
- Species: B. dactylis

Binomial name
- Buenoa dactylis Padilla-Gil, 2010

Species of true bug

Buenoa dactylis is a species of backswimmer first found in Colombia's Pacific coast.
