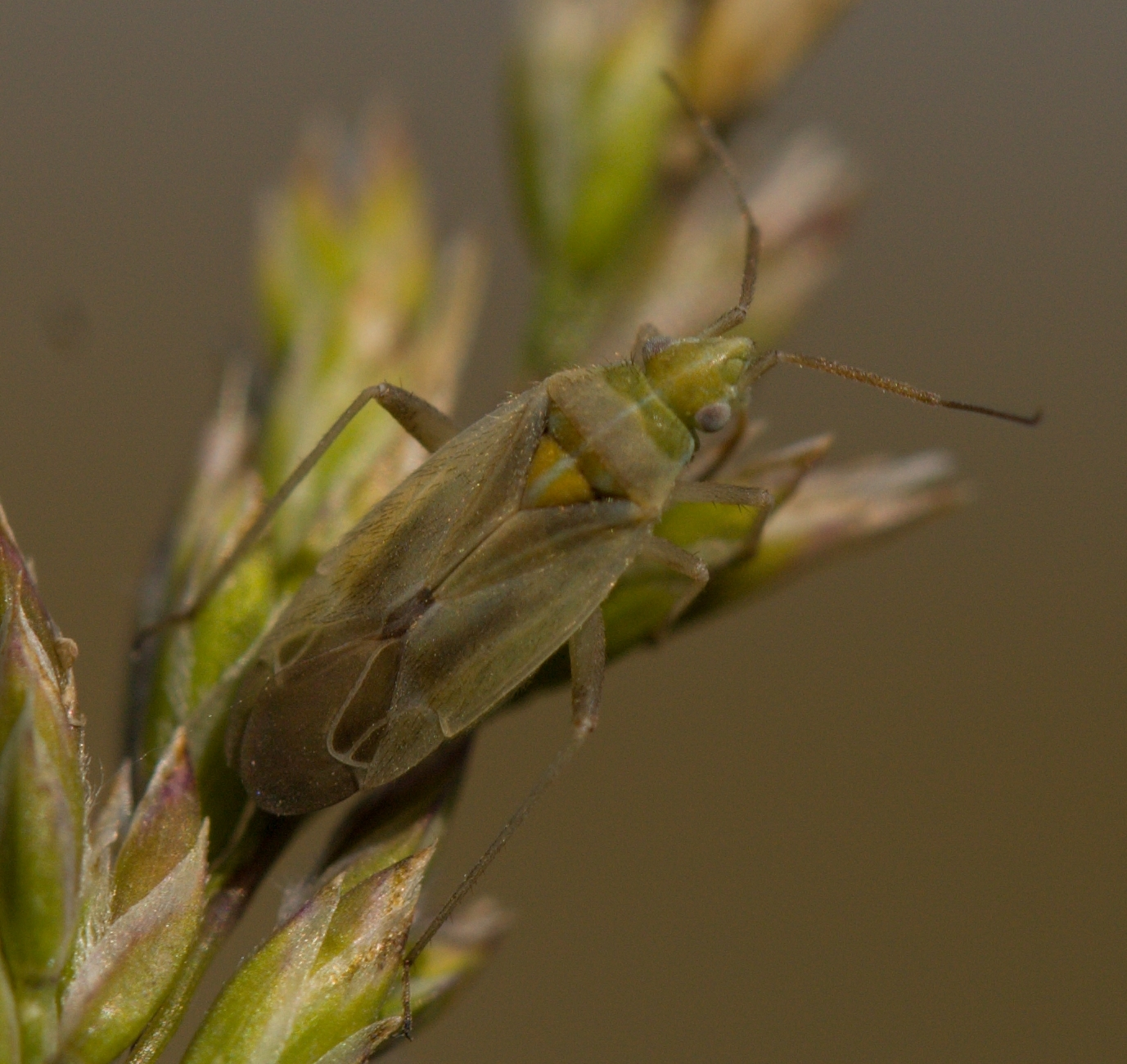
- Amblytylus nasutus

Scientific classification
- Kingdom: Animalia
- Phylum: Arthropoda
- Class: Insecta
- Order: Hemiptera
- Suborder: Heteroptera
- Family: Miridae
- Subfamily: Phylinae
- Genus: Amblytylus; Fieber, 1858

= Amblytylus =

Genus of true bugs

Amblytylus is a genus of plant bugs in the family Miridae. There are at least two described species in Amblytylus.

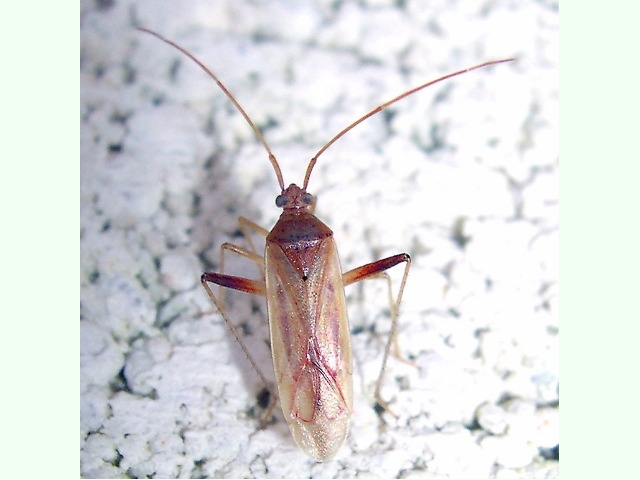
Amblytylus nasutus

== Species ==
- Amblytylus albidus (Hahn, 1834)
- Amblytylus nasutus (Kirschbaum, 1856)
