= Buenoa anomala =

Scientific classification
- Kingdom: Animalia
- Phylum: Arthropoda
- Clade: Pancrustacea
- Class: Insecta
- Order: Hemiptera
- Suborder: Heteroptera
- Family: Notonectidae
- Genus: Buenoa
- Species: B. anomala

Binomial name
- Buenoa anomala Padilla-Gil, 2010

Species of true bug

Buenoa anomala is a species of backswimmer first found in Colombia's Pacific coast.
