= Buenoa confusa =

Scientific classification
- Domain: Eukaryota
- Kingdom: Animalia
- Phylum: Arthropoda
- Class: Insecta
- Order: Hemiptera
- Suborder: Heteroptera
- Family: Notonectidae
- Genus: Buenoa
- Species: B. confusa

Binomial name
- Buenoa confusa Truxal, 1953

Species of true bug

Buenoa confusa is a species of backswimmer in the family Notonectidae. It is found in the Caribbean, Central America, and North America.
