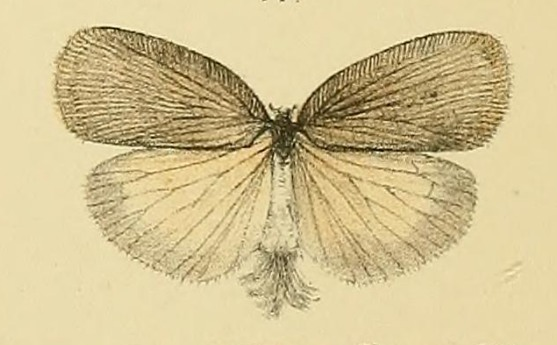
- Adelidoria glauca

Scientific classification
- Kingdom: Animalia
- Phylum: Arthropoda
- Class: Insecta
- Order: Hemiptera
- Suborder: Auchenorrhyncha
- Infraorder: Fulgoromorpha
- Family: Flatidae
- Tribe: Ceryniini
- Genus: Adelidoria; Metcalf, 1952

= Adelidoria =

Genus of planthoppers

Adelidoria is a genus of planthoppers belonging to the family Flatidae.

The species of this genus are found in Sri Lanka.

Species:

- Adelidoria glauca (Kirby, 1891)
