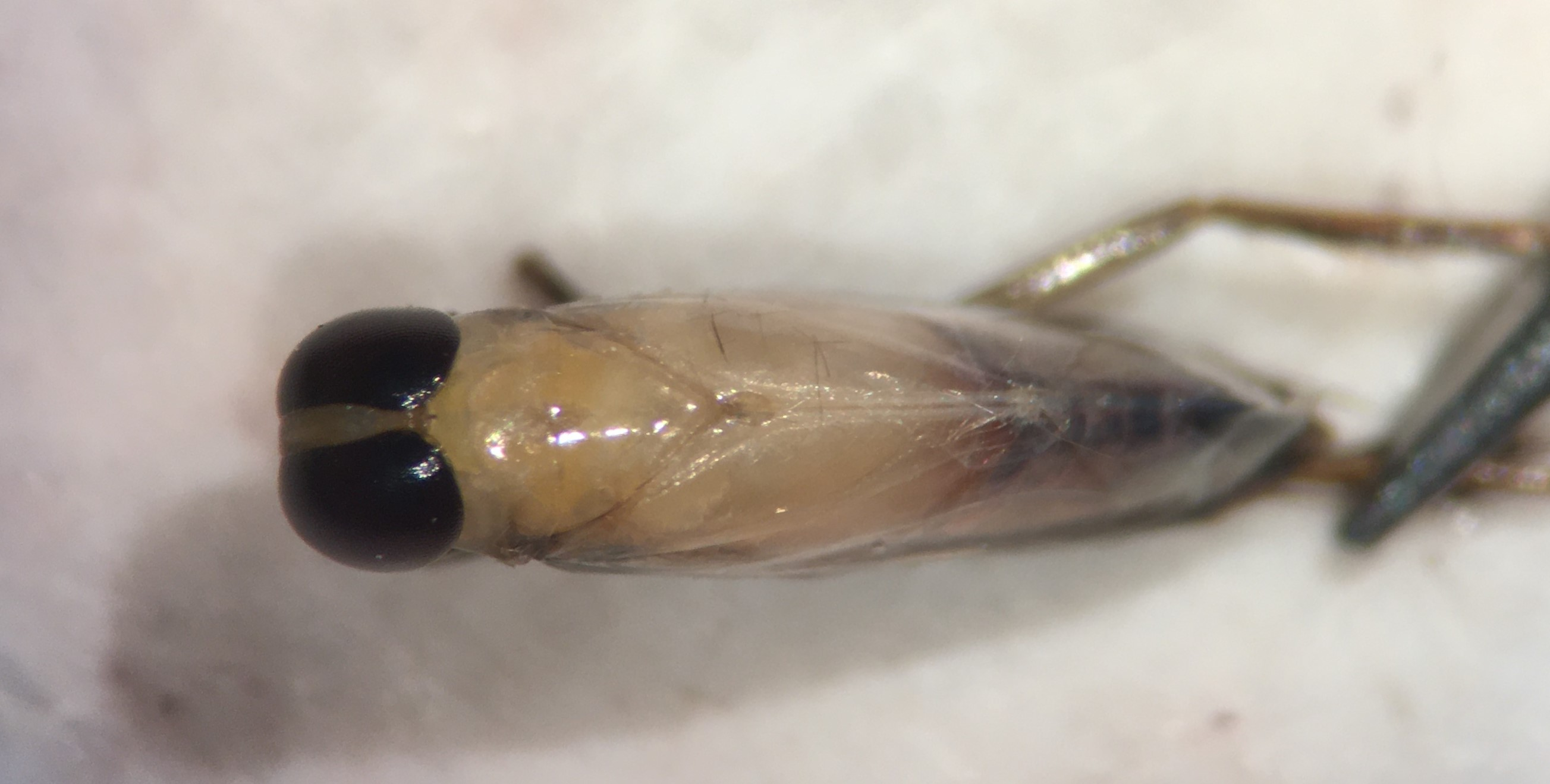

Scientific classification
- Kingdom: Animalia
- Phylum: Arthropoda
- Class: Insecta
- Order: Hemiptera
- Suborder: Heteroptera
- Family: Notonectidae
- Genus: Buenoa
- Species: B. marki

Binomial name
- Buenoa marki Reichart, 1971

= Buenoa marki =

Species of true bug

Buenoa marki is a species of backswimmer in the family Notonectidae. It is only known from the solution holes near the Pinelands Trail in Everglades National Park, Florida, although it may occur elsewhere.
