= Anchimolgidae =

Scientific classification
- Domain: Eukaryota
- Kingdom: Animalia
- Phylum: Arthropoda
- Class: Copepoda
- Order: Cyclopoida
- Suborder: Ergasilida
- Family: Anchimolgidae

Family of crustaceans

Anchimolgidae is a family of cyclopoid copepods in the order Cyclopoida. There are more than 30 genera and 130 described species in Anchimolgidae.

== Genera ==
These 32 genera belong to the family Anchimolgidae:

- Alienigena Cheng, MJ Ho & C.F.Dai, 2016
- Allopodion Humes, 1978
- Amarda Humes & Stock, 1972
- Amardopsis Humes, 1974
- Anchimolgus Humes & Stock, 1972
- Andrianellus Humes & Stock, 1972
- Cerioxynus Humes, 1974
- Clamocus Humes, 1979
- Dumbeana Humes, 1996
- Ecphysarion Humes, 1993
- Euxynus Humes, 1992
- Exodontomolgus Kim I.H., 2007
- Haplomolgus H.o.Humes, 1968
- Humesiella Sebastian & Pillai, 1973
- Jamescookina Humes, 1991
- Juxtandrianellus Humes, 1995
- Karanges Humes, 1979
- Kawanolus Humes, 1978
- Lipochaetes Humes, 1996
- Mycoxynus Humes, 1973
- Odontomolgus Humes & Stock, 1972
- Panjakus Humes & Stock, 1972
- Paraclamocus Humes, 1997
- Paramarda Humes, 1978
- Paranchimolgus Kim I.H., 2007
- Parandrianellus Humes, 1991
- Prionomolgus H.o.Humes, 1968
- Rakotoa Humes & Stock, 1972
- Schedomolgus Humes & Stock, 1972
- Scyphuliger Humes, 1991
- Sociellus Humes, 1992
- Unicispina Humes, 1993
