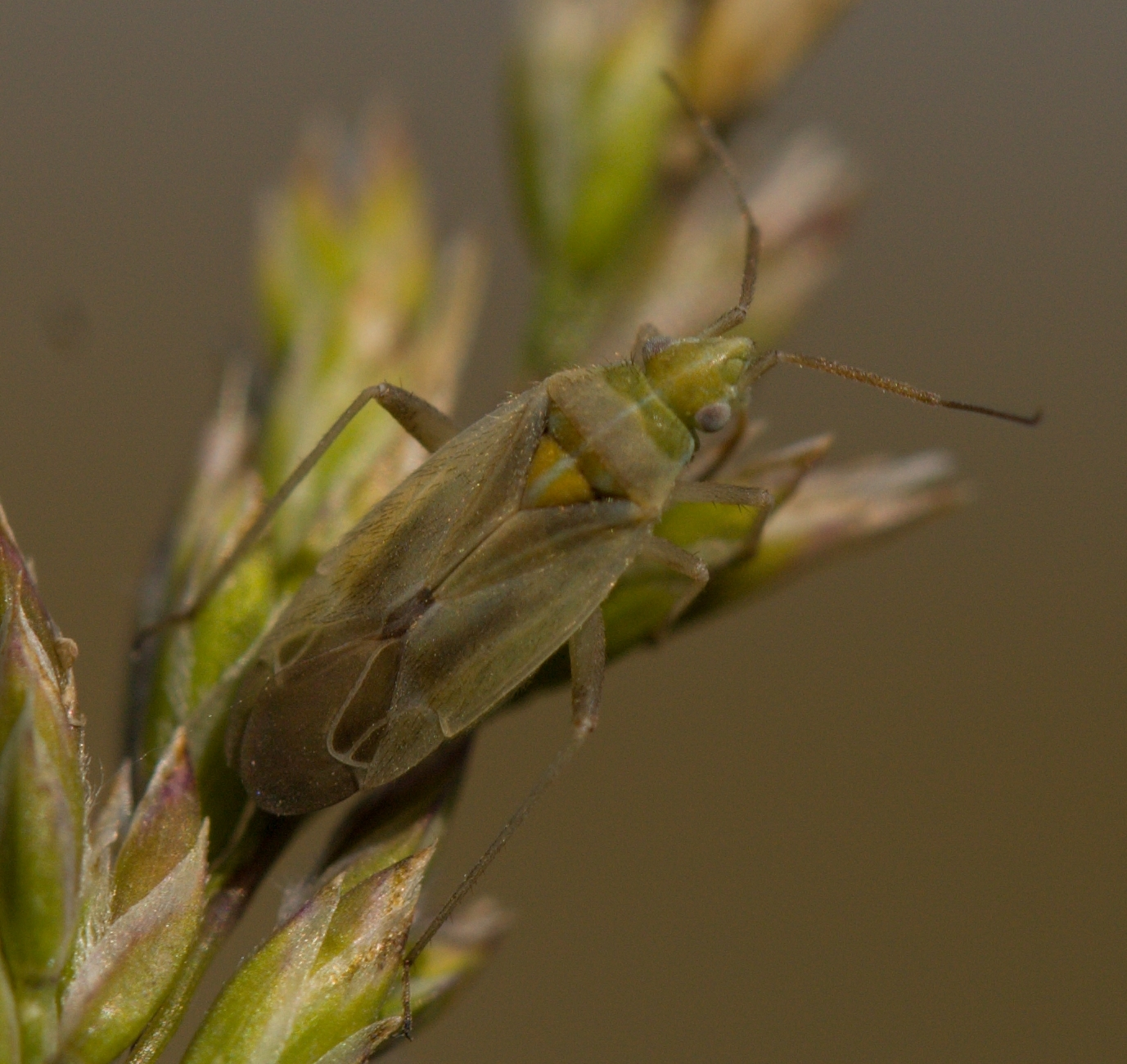

Scientific classification
- Kingdom: Animalia
- Phylum: Arthropoda
- Class: Insecta
- Order: Hemiptera
- Suborder: Heteroptera
- Family: Miridae
- Genus: Amblytylus
- Species: A. nasutus

Binomial name
- Amblytylus nasutus (Kirschbaum, 1856)

= Amblytylus nasutus =

Species of true bug

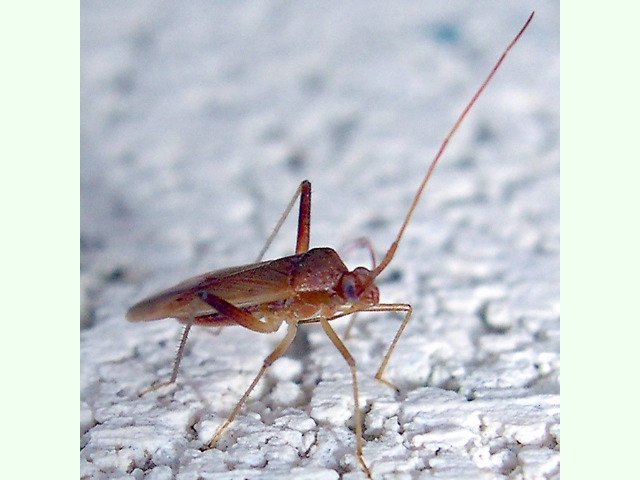

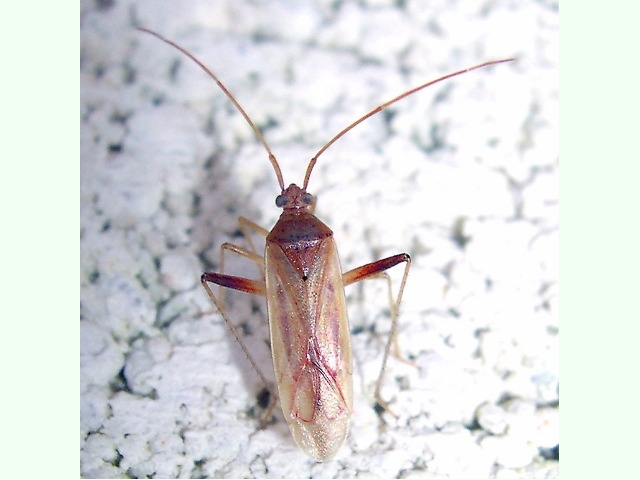

Amblytylus nasutus is a species of plant bug in the family Miridae. It is found in Europe, Northern Asia (excluding China), and North America.
