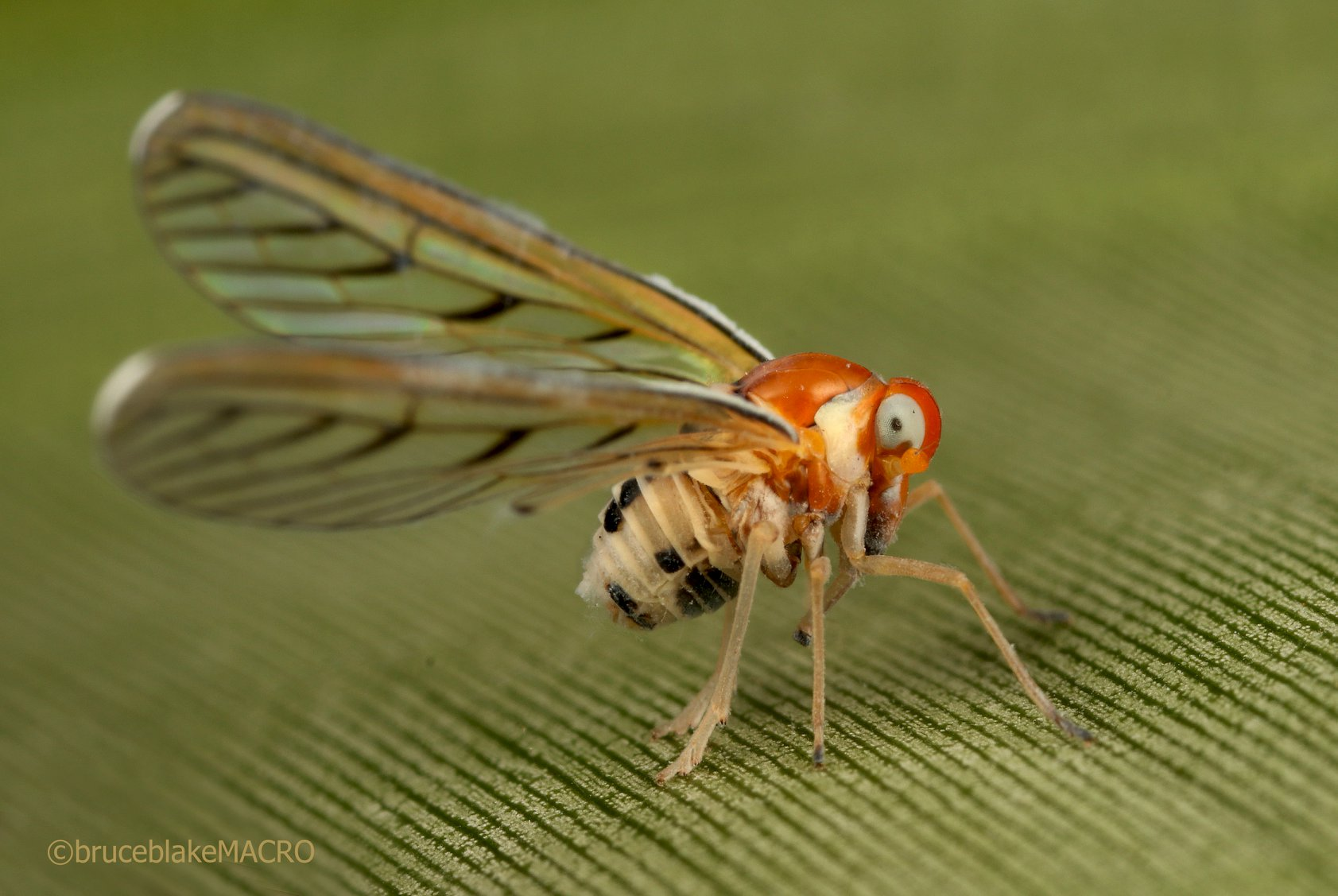
- Diostrombus abdominalis

Scientific classification
- Kingdom: Animalia
- Phylum: Arthropoda
- Clade: Pancrustacea
- Class: Insecta
- Order: Hemiptera
- Suborder: Auchenorrhyncha
- Infraorder: Fulgoromorpha
- Family: Derbidae
- Subfamily: Otiocerinae
- Tribe: Zoraidini
- Genus: Diostrombus; Uhler 1896

Synonyms
- Drona Distant, 1906; Camma Distant, 1907

= Diostrombus =

Genus of planthoppers

Diostrombus is a large genus of planthoppers from the family Derbidae, tribe Zoraidini, with more than 40 species. The large majority of species have been described from Africa and the Near East. However, a few species, including the type species, are found in southern and eastern parts of Asia. In Africa, the distribution range of Diostrombus species extends from the humid tropics of western Africa to many parts of eastern Africa, as far north as parts of Sudan and as far south as South Africa. Three species have been described from Yemen and the Iran. Like other species of the tribe Zoraidini, species of Diostrombus have long and narrow forewings and short hind wings. The main characteristic of Diostrombus is the forewing venation with the media vein having 6 branches which do not split further into sub branches. The hind wings are much shorter than half the forewing length and have a pointed tip. In profile the head is usually flat, but in some African species, the ridges on the sides of the face are extended in front of the antennae. The face is narrow. The antennae are short compared to other genera of the tribe Zoraidini, about half as long as the face.

Type species: Diostrombus politus Uhler, 1896

== Distribution ==
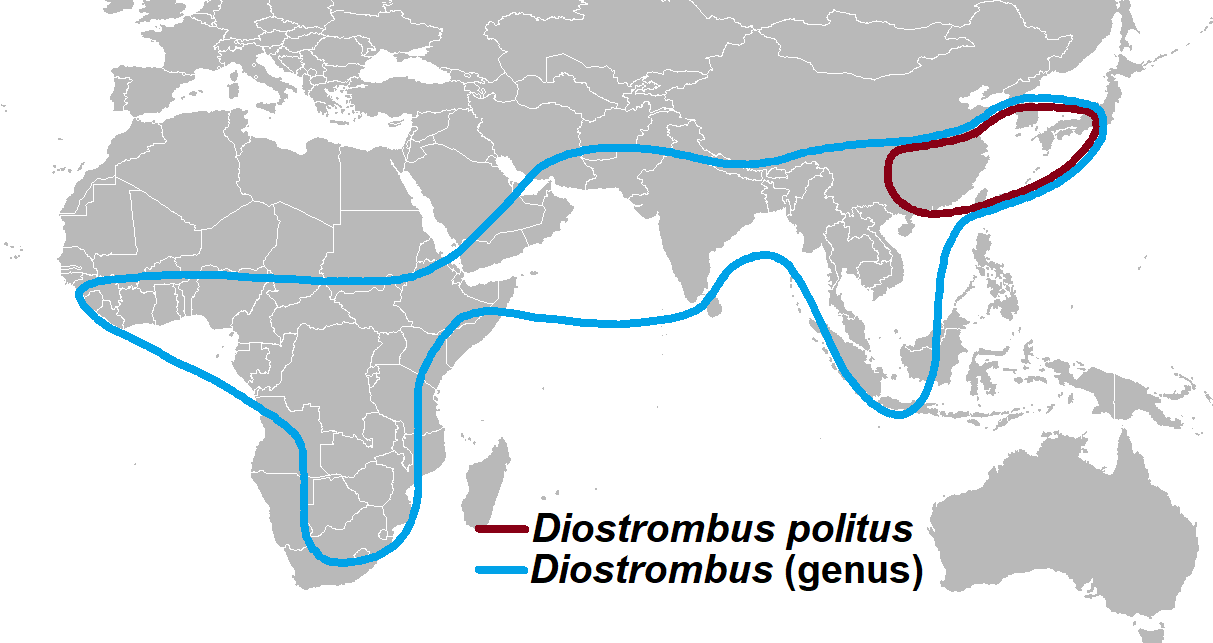
Distribution ranges of the species in the genus Diostrombus (blue outline) and that of Diostrombus politus, the type species (brown outline)

More than 80% of the species described in the genus Diostrombus are found in Africa, and the majority of these have been reported from the humid tropics of western Africa, from Guinea and Sierra Leone in the North to the Democratic Republic of the Congo in the South. In eastern Africa the distribution of Diostrombus species ranges from parts of Sudan and Ethiopia in the North to parts of South Africa in the South. One species has been also described from Yemen (Diostrombus nike) and two from Iran (D. adila and D. jezeki). Further east in Asia, three more Diostrombus species are found, Diostrombus carnosa, D. pennatus and the type species, D. politus. In Asia, the distribution of Diostrombus species ranges from Iran and Pakistan in the West, over India, Nepal, Myanmar, parts of China, Taiwan, South Korea to southern parts of Japan in the East. It also includes parts of Indonesia in the South.

== Description ==
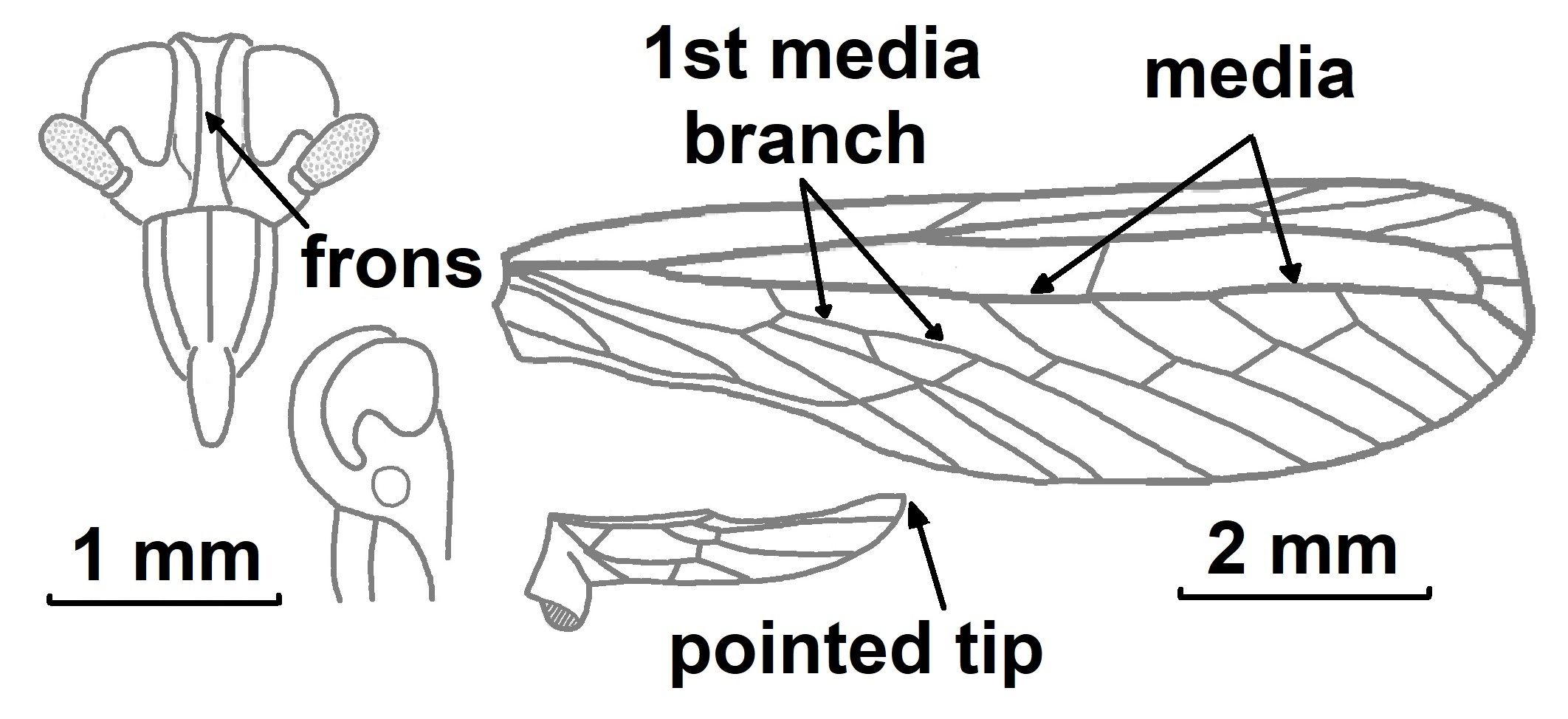
Diostrombus politus - Left: head in frontal and side view - Right: shape and venation of forewing (top) and hind wing (bottom), with the media and the first media branch marked. The hind wing has a pointed tip.

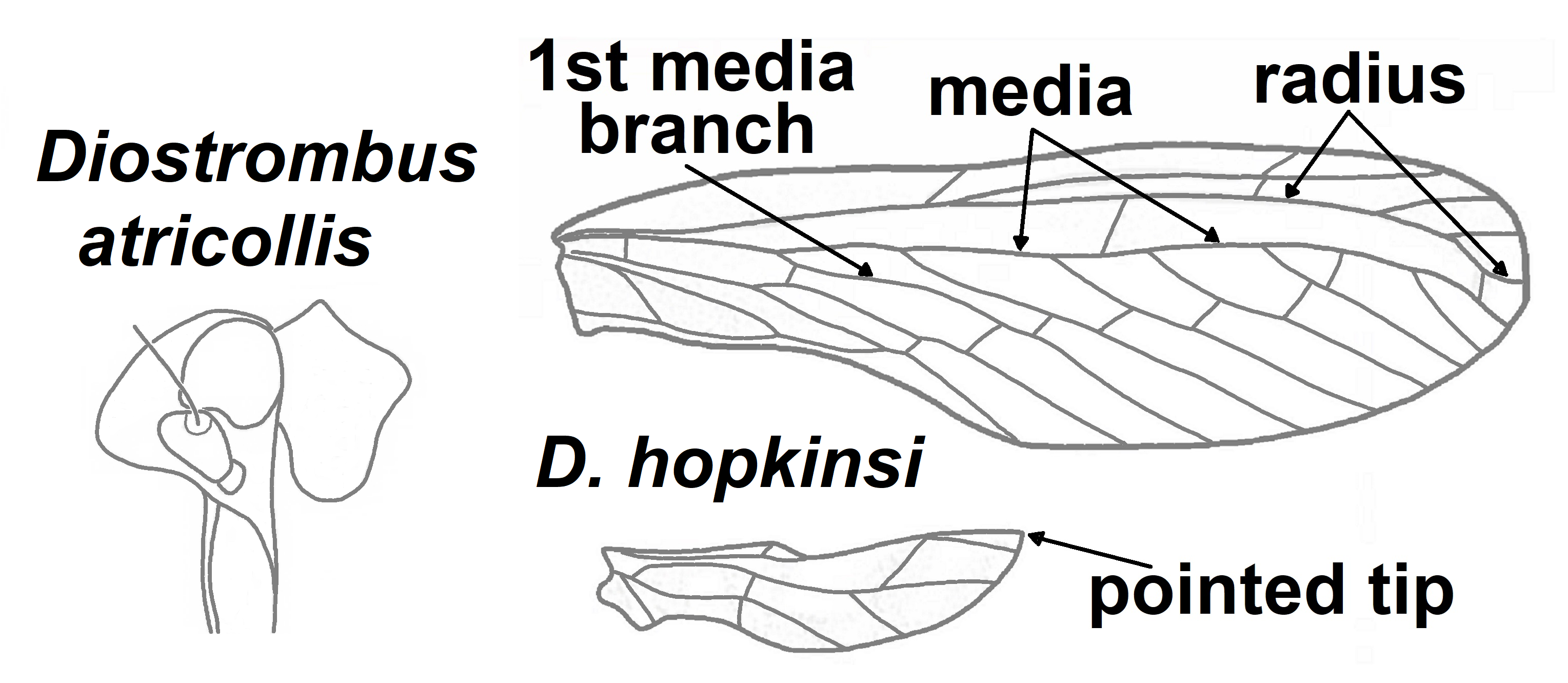
Left: Profile of Diostrombus atricollis - Right: Forewing and hind wing of Diostrombus hopkinsi

Species of Diostrombus can be recognized by the venation of the forewings and the pointed tips of the hind wings. The media of the forewing has six branches, with none of them branching further into sub branches. The radius has 2 short sub branches near its tip and compared to other Zoraidini, there are 2 long and rather broad cells between the radius and the media. The hind wings are much shorter than half the forewing length and have a distinctive shape with a pointed tip near the frontal (costal) margin.

The face (frons) of Diostrombus species is narrow with the ridges on its sides running approximately parallel to each other. In side view, the head typically has a flat profile. However, in some African species like in Diostrombus atricollis, the ridges on the side of the face are extended in front of the antennae. Compared to other genera of Zoraidini, the antennae are short and cylindrical, only about half as long as the face. The terminal arista (bristle) is inserted below the tip of the antennae.

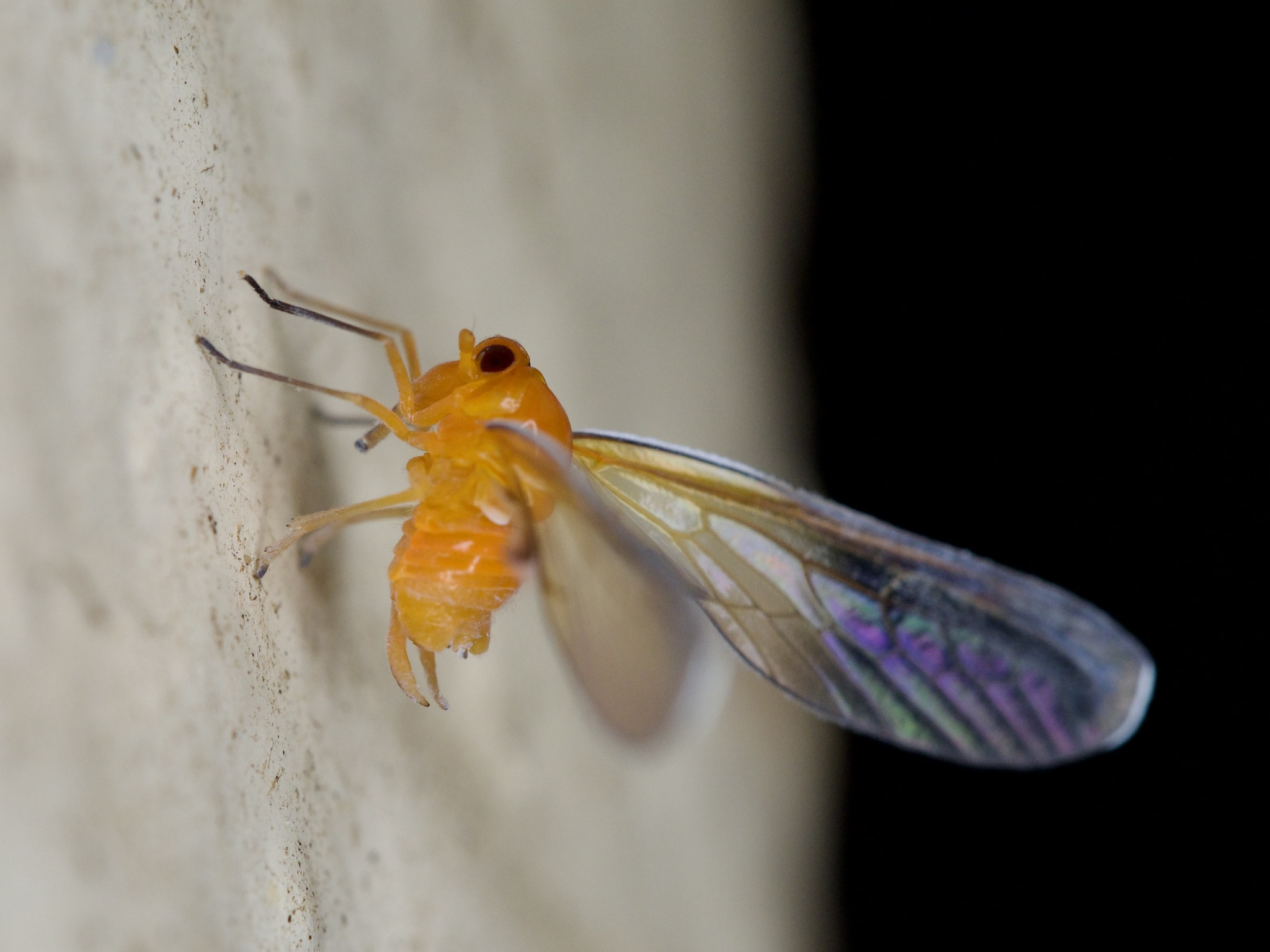
Diostrombus politus from Japan

Many Diostrombus species are coloured orange, red or yellow like the type species which is almost completely orange-red (see the illustration on the right). Other species are only partly orange or yellow and often also have parts which are black or dark brown. A few species are predominantly black. The forewings usually have a length of 7 to 9 mm and the length of the body, from head to the tip of the abdomen, is around 4 or 5 mm. Like in other planthoppers of the tribe Zoraidini, the wings are raised and spread out when the insects are at rest.

== Biology ==
There is no information on the biology of the nymphal stages of Diostrombus species. However, it can be assumed that they live in decaying organic matter like other derbids, feeding on fungi. The adults prefer to feed on monocots like palm trees, maize or rice, like other members of the tribe Zoraidini. Some Asian species can be common enough to be listed occasionally as minor pests.

Diostrombus species may be also vectors of plant diseases. In Mozambique, Diostrombus mkurangai was found to be one of the most common sap-sucking insects on coconut palms affected by the lethal yellowing disease and the causal phytoplasma agent was present in this species. In Ghana, a similar disease called Cape Saint Paul Wilt also affects coconut palms and Diostrombus species were again common on diseased palms. In a transmission trial, 4 Diostrombus species were collected from diseased palms and placed in cages together with healthy palms. One of two coconut palms exposed to 4,380 insects from the genus Diostrombus tested positive for the disease with PCR, but failed to develop symptoms.

== Taxonomy and species ==
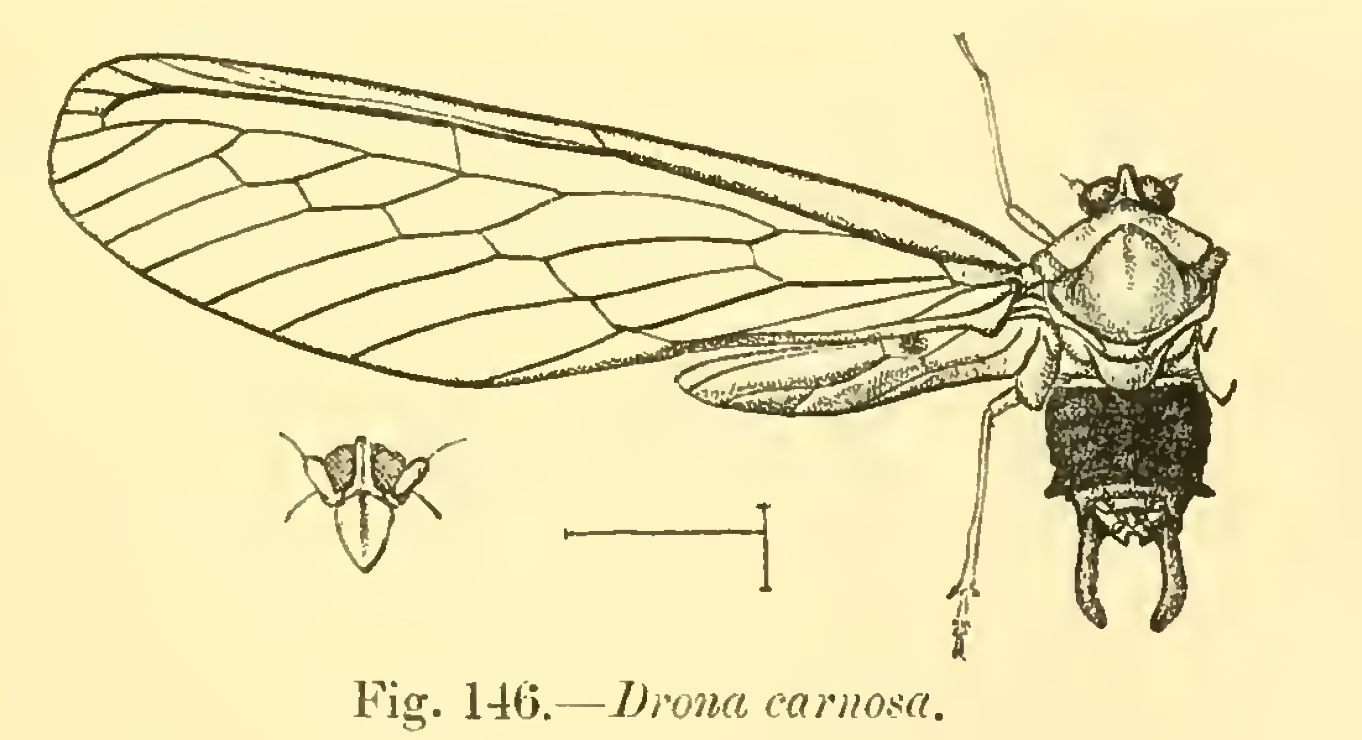
Illustration by W.L. Distant in 1906 of Drona carnosa, now known as Diostrombus carnosa

Two other genera have been described which are now regarded as synonyms of Diostrombus. These are Drona Distant, 1906 with the type species Drona carnosa Distant, 1906 (see illustration on the left) from Myanmar and Camma Distant, 1907 with the type species Camma dilatata (Westwood, 1851) from Sierra Leone.

As of 2024, a total of 43 species have been described in the genus Diostrombus. The following species have been cited most frequently in the scientific literature (as per Google Scholar):

- Diostrombus abdominalis (Distant, 1907)
- Diostrombus carnosa (Westwood, 1851)
- Diostrombus dilatatus (Westwood, 1851)
- Diostrombus gangumis Van Stalle, 1984
- Diostrombus gowdeyi Distant, 1914
- Diostrombus luteus (Muir, 1926)
- Diostrombus mkurangai Wilson, 1987
- Diostrombus nitidus Muir, 1926
- Diostrombus politus Uhler, 1896
- Diostrombus rufus Muir, 1928
