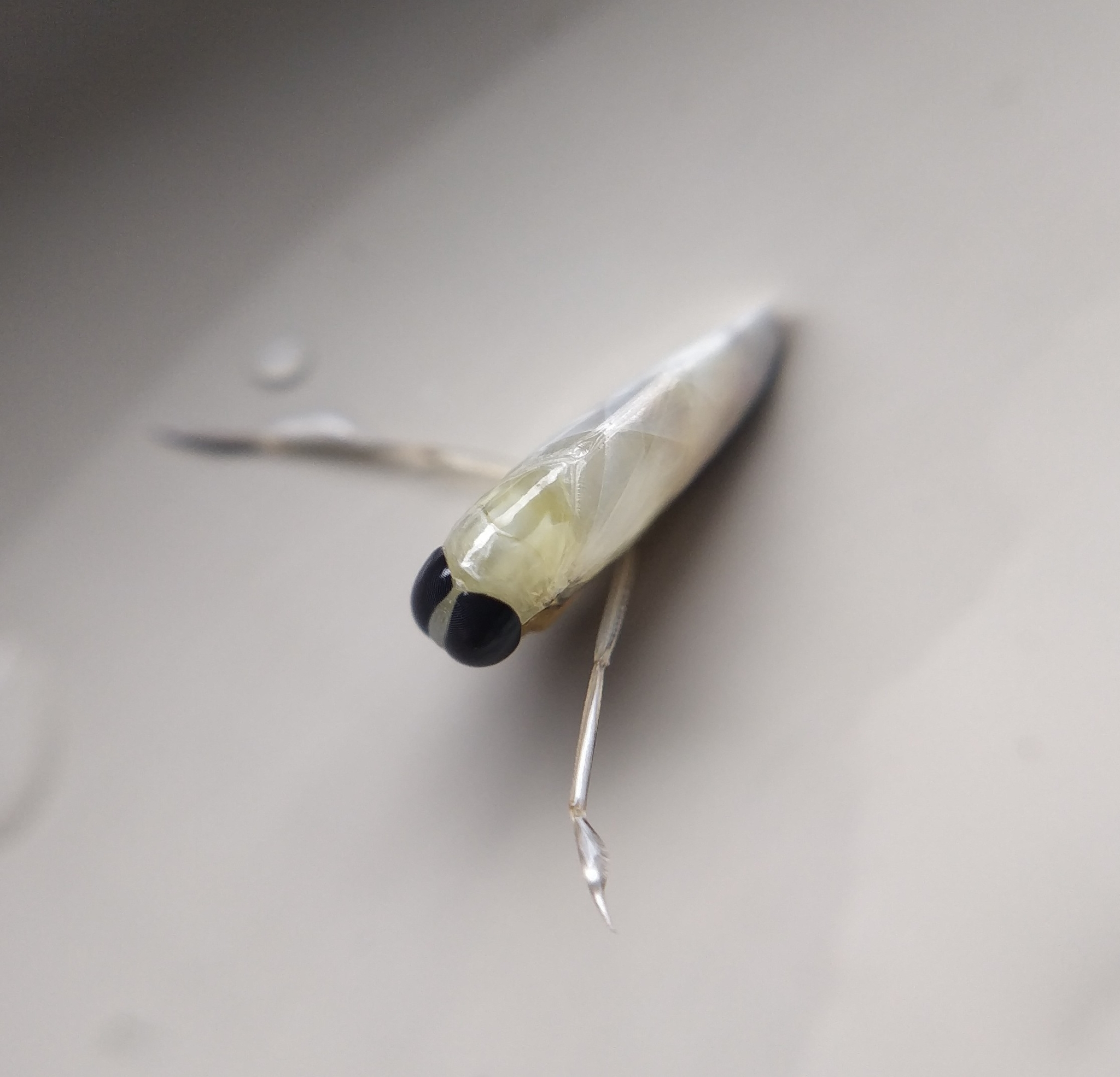
- Anisops debilis

Scientific classification
- Domain: Eukaryota
- Kingdom: Animalia
- Phylum: Arthropoda
- Class: Insecta
- Order: Hemiptera
- Suborder: Heteroptera
- Family: Notonectidae
- Genus: Anisops; Spinola, 1837

Type species
- Notovecta nivea Fabricius, 1775

= Anisops =

Genus of insects

Anisops is a genus of insects in the family Notonectidae. They're sometimes referred to as backswimmers, so called because they swim upside down.

== Taxonomy ==
Anisops contains the following species:

- Anisops letitia
- Anisops varia
- Anisops aglaia
- Anisops apicalis
- Anisops gracilis
- Anisops hypatria
- Anisops jaczewskii
- Anisops leesoniana
- Anisops perpulcher
- Anisops poweri
- Anisops praetexta
- Anisops psyche
- Anisops varius
- Anisops amaisi
- Anisops thienemanni
- Anisops hyperion
- Anisops planifascies
- Anisops crinitus
- Anisops wakefieldi - Endemic to New Zealand.
- Anisops debilis
- Anisops pellucens
- Anisops sardea
- Anisops tahitiensis
- Anisops deanei
- Anisops kuroiwae
- Anisops stali
- Anisops elstoni
- Anisops sardeus
- Anisops nasuta
- Anisops occipitalis
- Anisops assimilis - Endemic to New Zealand.
- Anisops ogasawarensis
