= George Willis Kirkaldy =

English entomologist (1873–1910)

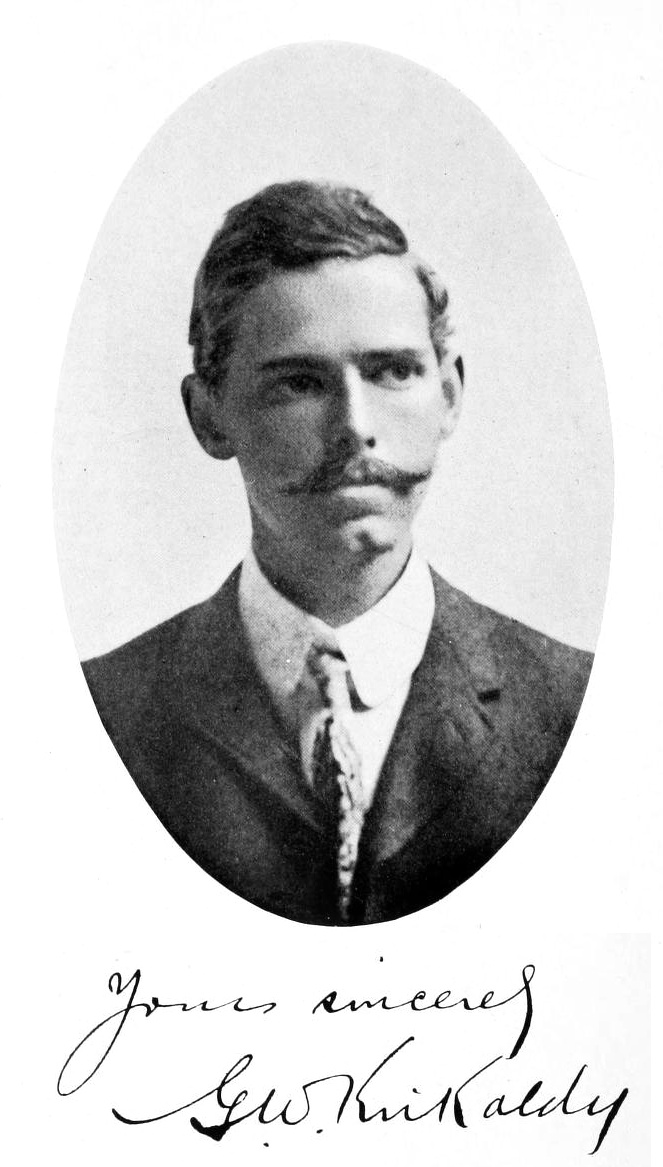
George Willis Kirkaldy

George Willis Kirkaldy (July 26, 1873 – February 2, 1910) was an English entomologist who specialised on Hemiptera. He was a Fellow of the Royal Entomological Society from 1893.

Kirkaldy, born in Clapham, in Greater London to W. H. Kirkaldy of Wimbledon was educated in England. Even at school in London he showed an interest in natural history and was appointed curator of the school museum. As a young boy he joined a debating club and spoke on the colouration of insects. He later went to Hawaii in 1903 to work for the United States Department of Agriculture then for the Hawaiian Sugar Planters' Association Experimental Station. While in Honolulu he had a riding accident which resulted in his fracturing his leg at five places. This injury never healed and his death in 1910 at San Francisco, California followed five days after the last of several surgery attempts to fix it. Kirkaldy was the author of the 1906 Leafhoppers and their Natural Enemies. Pt IX. Leafhoppers - Hemiptera (Bulletin of the Hawaiian Sugar Planters Association Division of Entomology 1(9): 271–479), and the 1909 Catalogue of the Hemiptera (Heteroptera) with biological and anatomical references, lists of foodplants and parasites (Berlin) and very many taxonomic papers describing new species and genera.

Amongst his generic names for insects are Ohchisme, Dolichisme, Elachisme, Florichisme, Isachisme, Marichisme, Nanichisme, Peggichisme, and Polychisme. The Greek suffix "-chisme" is pronounced "kiss-me" and Kirkaldy prefaced it with the names of the various women from alleged romantic conquests. In 1912 a letter to the International Entomological Congress from Lord Walsingham sought to make these names invalid on the basis of their being non-classical in their derivation. Kirkaldy himself had been a firm adherent to the principle of priority and was against any form of orthographic emendation to the spelling proposed by the original authors.

His collections of Auchenorrhyncha and Heteroptera are in the Natural History Museum, London, the University of Kansas (Snow Collection), the Bernice P. Bishop Museum, Honolulu and the National Museum of Natural History in Washington.
