= Zeugma =

Zeugma may refer to:

- Zeugma and syllepsis, figures of speech
- Zeugma (Commagene), an ancient settlement in Commagene (eastern Anatolia)
- Zeugma (Dacia), an ancient settlement in Dacia, mentioned by Ptolemy
- Zeugma (literary journal), a periodical
- Zeugma Systems, a telecommunications equipment supplier
- Zeugma (planthopper), an insect genus in the family Derbidae, tribe Zoraidini
- Zeugma (genus), a moth in tribe Cosymbiini

== See also ==
- Seleucia at the Zeugma, an ancient Hellenistic city
- Zeugma Mosaic Museum, Gaziantep, Turkey
