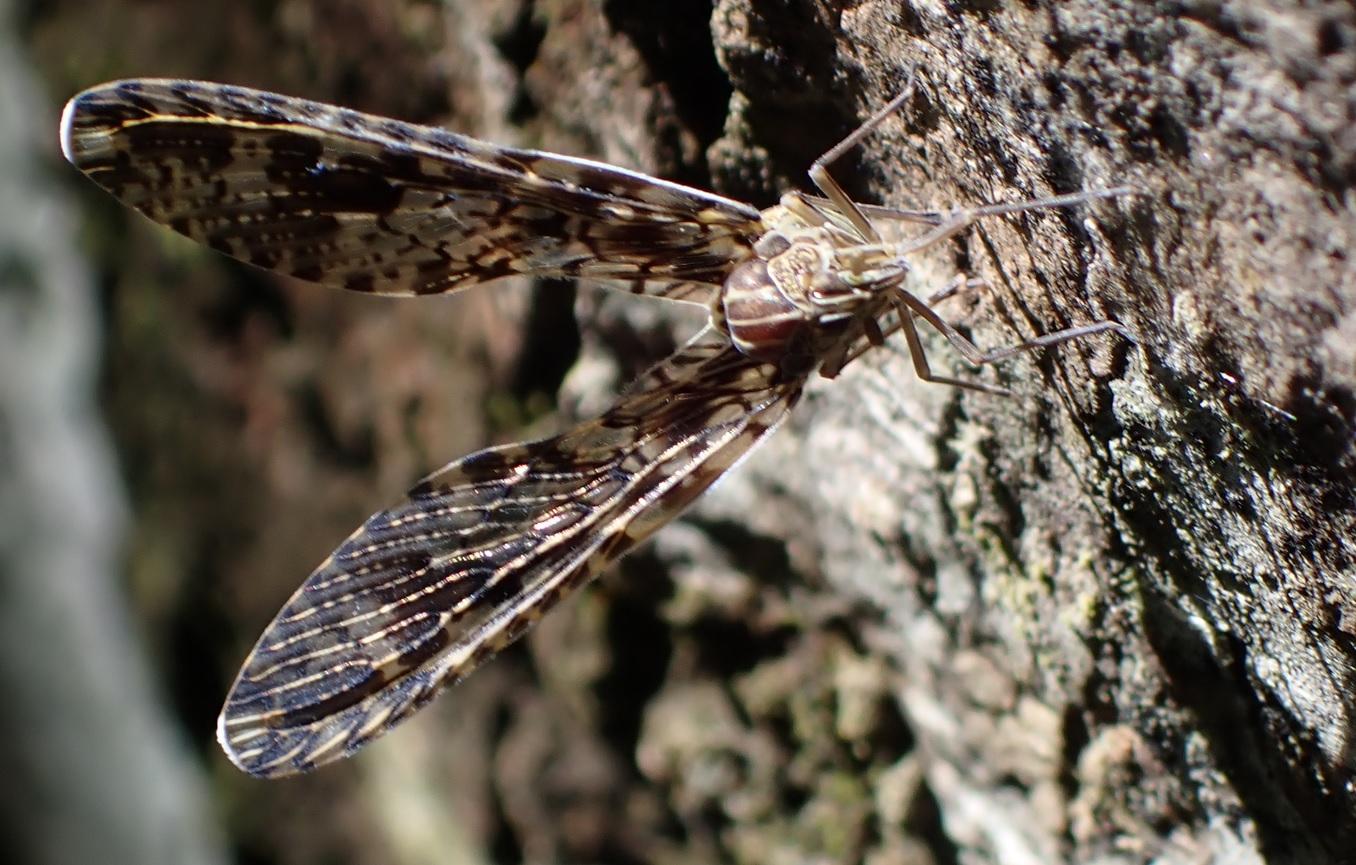
- Helcita shirakii

Scientific classification
- Domain: Eukaryota
- Kingdom: Animalia
- Phylum: Arthropoda
- Class: Insecta
- Order: Hemiptera
- Suborder: Auchenorrhyncha
- Infraorder: Fulgoromorpha
- Family: Derbidae
- Subfamily: Otiocerinae
- Tribe: Zoraidini
- Genus: Helcita; Stål, 1856

Synonyms
- Jada Distant, 1906

= Helcita =

Genus of planthoppers

Helcita is a small genus of planthoppers from the family Derbidae, tribe Zoraidini, currently (2024) with only 4 species. All of the species are uncommon. They have rather restricted and widely separated distribution ranges. Two species are found in tropical parts of Africa, one in Sri Lanka and southern India, and one in Taiwan and some neighbouring islands of Japan. The species of Helcita can be distinguished from other similar genera by a combination of features related to the venation of the forewings and the shape of the head. On the forewing, the media vein has 6 branches with the 3rd branch forking further into 2 sub branches. This venation is similar to that of the genus Pamendanga from which Helcita species can be distinguished by the profile of the head. In Helcita species, the head extends conically in front of the eyes, whereas Pamendanga species have a flat profile.

Type species: Derbe wahlbergi Stål, 1855, a synonym of Helcita wahlbergi

== Distribution ==
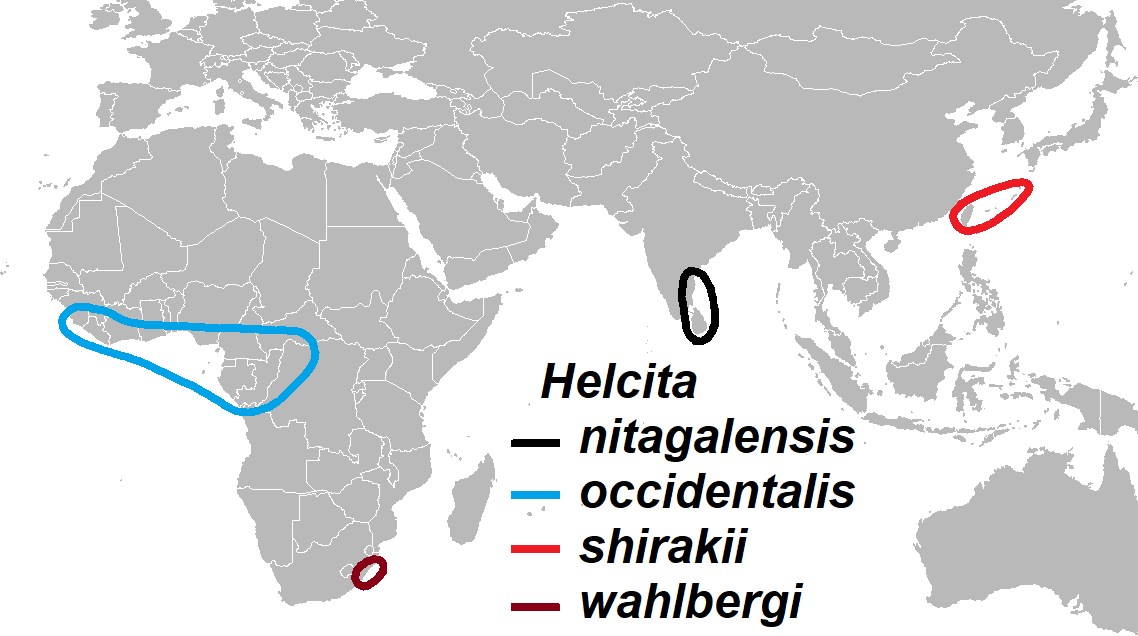
Distribution ranges of the species in the genus Helcita

The 4 species of Helcita are all uncommon and have few distribution records. Their ranges are clearly separated, with none of the distributions overlapping. The type species, Helcita wahlbergi was described from "terra Natalensi", a part of South Africa now known as the KwaZulu-Natal Province. In that region, H. wahlbergi has been mainly reported from coastal areas, around the city of Durban and further north along the coast, almost up to the border with Mozambique.

In 1926, Muir reported H. wahlbergi also from Sierra Leone, providing a description and illustration. However, 2 years later he realized that this report was based on a misidentification and he renamed the species in Sierra Leone to Helcita occidentalis. H. occidentalis has been also reported from the Central African Republic and from 2 locations in the Democratic Republic of the Congo.

A third species, Helcita nitagalensis, has been described from Nitagala in Sri Lanka, originally under the name Derbe nitagalensis. That species has been also reported in south-eastern parts of India. A fourth species, Helcita shirakii, has been described from Taiwan. That species is also listed as part of the fauna of the Ryukyu Islands in southern Japan.

== Description ==
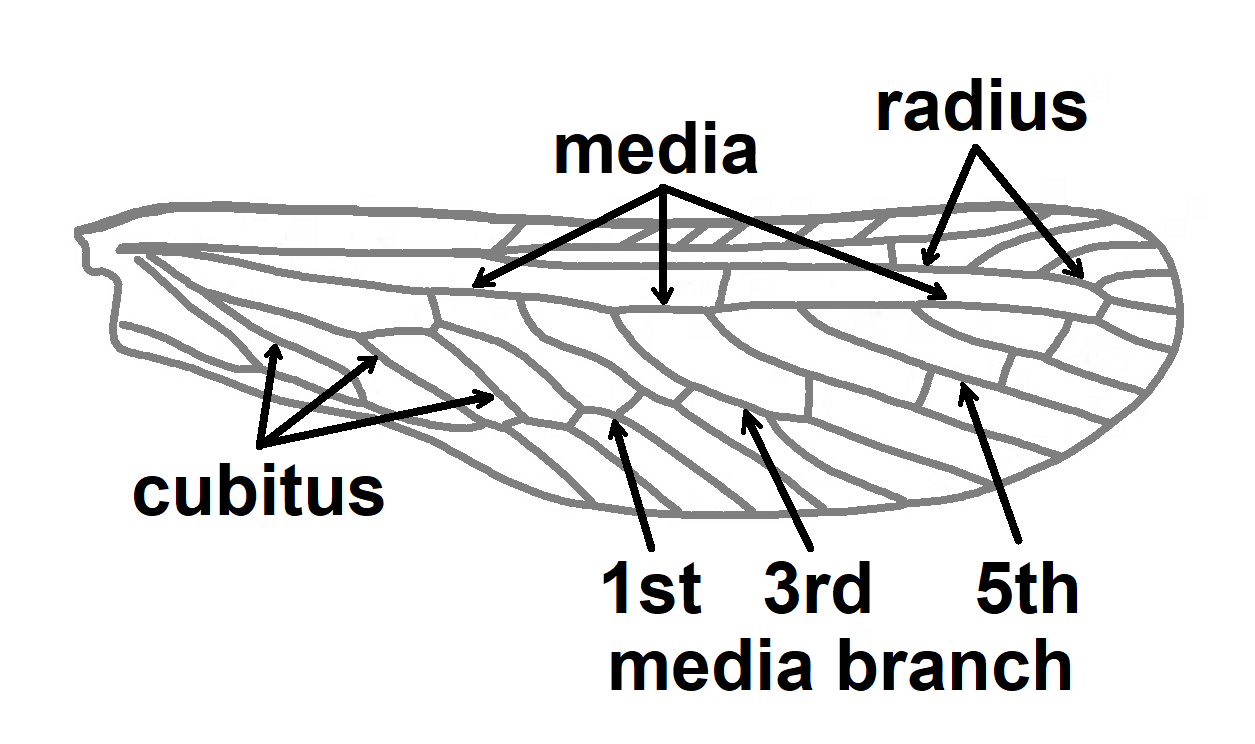
Forewing venation of Helcita wahlbergi, the type species of the genus Helcita

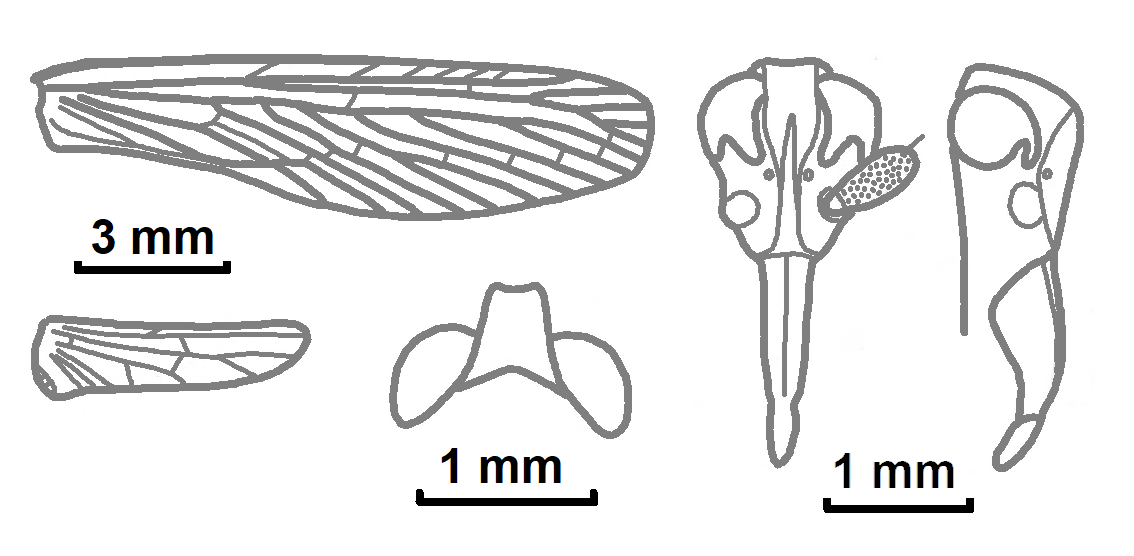
Wings with venation and head of Helcita shirakii. On the left: forewing (top) and hind wing (bottom); bottom centre: head in dorsal view; right: head in frontal view and far right: profile of head

The species of Helcita show similarities to those in the genus Pamendanga. However, in Pamendanga species the head has a flat profile, while in Helcita the head is conically extended in front of the eyes, when seen from the side. On the forewing, Helcita species have a media vein with 6 branches, and the third branch splits again into two sub branches. The radius has 3 branches near its tip. The hind wing of Helcita species is about half as long as the forewing and usually longer compared to those of Pamendanga species. Like many other species of Zoraidini, resting Helcita species raise their wings above the body and spread them out at an angle of about 60°.

The upper side of the head between the eyes (the vertex) can be rather wide like in Helcita shirakii or narrow like in Helcita nitagalensis. In Helcita wahlbergi and H. occidentalis the width of the vertex is in between these two extremes, but is still wider compared to most species of Pamendanga where the vertex is usually narrow and triangular. In frontal view, the upper part of the face of Helcita species can also be wide, corresponding to the width of the vertex. However, in those cases, the face is narrower between the eyes. The antennae of Helcita species are elongated, but shorter than the face, whereas in Pamendaga species they are about as long as the face.

Helcita species have a body size of around 4 mm and a forewing length of around 10 mm. The general colour is brownish to ochrous, with the ridges on the head and the mesonotum being whitish yellow. The forewings are typically brownish with transparent patches or transparent with brown patches. The veins are whitish to yellowish. Some species, like Helcita wahlbergi, seem to have a variable colouration, ranging from whitish to brownish. The individual Helcita species can be distinguished by their colouration and the structures of the male genitalia.

== Biology ==
There is no information on the biology of the immature stages of Helcita species. However, it can be assumed that they live in decaying organic matter like other derbids, feeding on fungi. There are few host plant records for the adult hoppers in the genus Helcita. In other members of the tribe Zoraidini, the adults feed mainly on monocots. Images of Helcita wahlbergi also suggest they feed on monocots, but Helcita occidentalis has been reported from both oil palms (a monocot) and from cacao trees (not a monocot).

== Taxonomy and species ==
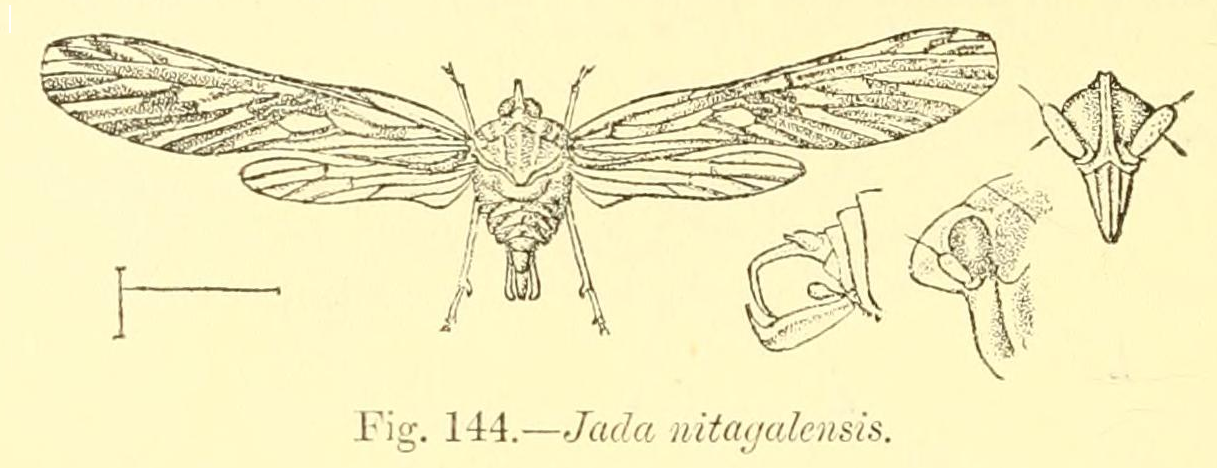
Original drawing by Distant of Jada nitagalensis, a synonym of Helcita nitagalensis

The description of the genus Helcita by Stål in 1856 was based on a South African species which Stål had described a year earlier as Derbe wahlbergi. The very short descriptions by Stål of both the type species and the genus were expanded by subsequent authors, who provided distinguishing characters to similar genera in the tribe Zoraidini, like Pamendanga. In 1906, Distant described the genus Jada, based on a species from Sri Lanka which had been described in 1891 by Kirby as "Derbe (?) nitagalensis". However, the genus Jada was subsequently regarded to be a synonym of Helcita by Muir. In 1910, another species of Jada, Jada maculipennis, was described by Charles S. Banks from the Philippine island of Palawan. However, that species is now regarded as belonging to the genus Pamendanga.

=== Helcita nitagalensis ===
Derbe (?) nitagalensis Kirby, 1891
Thracia nitagalensis (Kirby, 1891)
Jada nitagalensis (Kirby, 1891)
Helcita nitagalensis (Kirby, 1891)
This species has been named after the type locality, Nitagala in Sri Lanka. Apart from Sri Lanka, it has been also reported from south-eastern India. The colouration is described by Distant as "Tawny-yellow; vertex of head, thoracic carinations, and face nearly pure white; apices of tarsi black; tegmina pale tawny-brown, the veins yellow ...".

=== Helcita occidentalis ===
Helcita wahlbergi Muir, 1926 [not Stål]
Helcita occidentalis Muir, 1928
In 1926, Muir described and illustrated a species from Sierra Leone which he wrote agrees quite well with Stål's Helcita wahlbergi except for darker marks on the forewings. He would need to examine a male from South Africa (the type locality of H. wahlbergi) to confirm this identification. In 1928, after having examined a male from Durban, South Africa, he wrote that the specimens from Sierra Leone and South Africa belong to different species, and he renamed the Sierra Leone species as Helcita occidentalis.

There are few records of H. occidentalis, but the distribution seems to extend from Sierra Leone to the Central African Republique and to the northern and western parts of the Democratic Republic of the Congo. The colouration has been described as ochrous brown with some parts darker, the lower parts and the sides are lighter and the pronotum is yellowish white. The forewings are translucent with many brown patches, especially in the costal area and at the tips of the veins. The fore and middle femurs are dark brown in front and the fore and middle tibiae as well as the tarsi are brown. The hind tibiae are yellowish with brown tips.

=== Helcita shirakii ===
Helcita shirakii Yang and Wu, 1993
This species has been described from Taiwan, but is also reported from the Ryukyu Islands in southern Japan. The general colour has been described as brown with yellowish brown spots on pronotum and abdomen. The ridges on head and mesonotum are light yellowish. The forewings are brownish, interrupted by lighter areas.

=== Helcita wahlbergi ===
Derbe wahlbergi Stål, 1855
Helcita wahlbergi (Stål, 1855)
This is the type species of the genus Helcita. It is found in South Africa, around the city of Durban. The colouration has been described as yellowish. The forewings are whitish with brown patches.
