= Paraperipatus =

Scientific classification
- Kingdom: Animalia
- Phylum: Onychophora
- Family: Peripatopsidae
- Genus: Paraperipatus; Ruhberg, 1985

Species
- See text

Genus of basal Peripatopsid velvet worms

Paraperipatus is a genus of velvet worms in the family Peripatopsidae. This genus exhibits matrotrophic viviparity, that is, mothers in this genus retain eggs in their uteri and supply nourishment to their embryos, but without any placenta. Species in this genus are found in New Guinea and the surrounding islands, including the Maluku achipelago.

== Description ==
The number of legs vary within species as well as among species in this genus and can range from as few as 21 pairs (e.g., in P. ceramensis) up to 27 pairs in males and 29 pairs in females (both in P. papuensis). The maximum number of leg pairs recorded in this genus (29) is also the maximum number of leg pairs found in the family Peripatopsidae. Females in this genus range from 11 mm to 90 mm in length, while the males range from 11 mm to 45 mm in length. The feet feature three distal papillae, with one anterior, one posterior, and the position of the third variable, but usually in the middle between the others. The nephridial opening on the fourth and fifth leg pairs is in the center of the third pad on the soles of the feet. The genital pad in both sexes is located behind the last pair of legs. In males, the genital pad is prominent and conical.

== Species ==
The genus contains the following species:

- Paraperipatus ceramensis (Muir & Kershaw, 1909)
- Paraperipatus keiensis Horst, 1923
- Paraperipatus lorentzi Horst, 1910
- Paraperipatus novaebritanniae (Willey, 1898)
- Paraperipatus papuensis (Sedgwick, 1910)
- Paraperipatus vanheurni Horst, 1922

Paraperipatus amboinensis Pflugfelder, 1948, Paraperipatus leopoldi Leloup 1931, Paraperipatus schultzei Heymons, 1912, and Paraperipatus stresemanni Bouvier, 1914 are considered nomina dubia by Oliveira et al., 2012.
