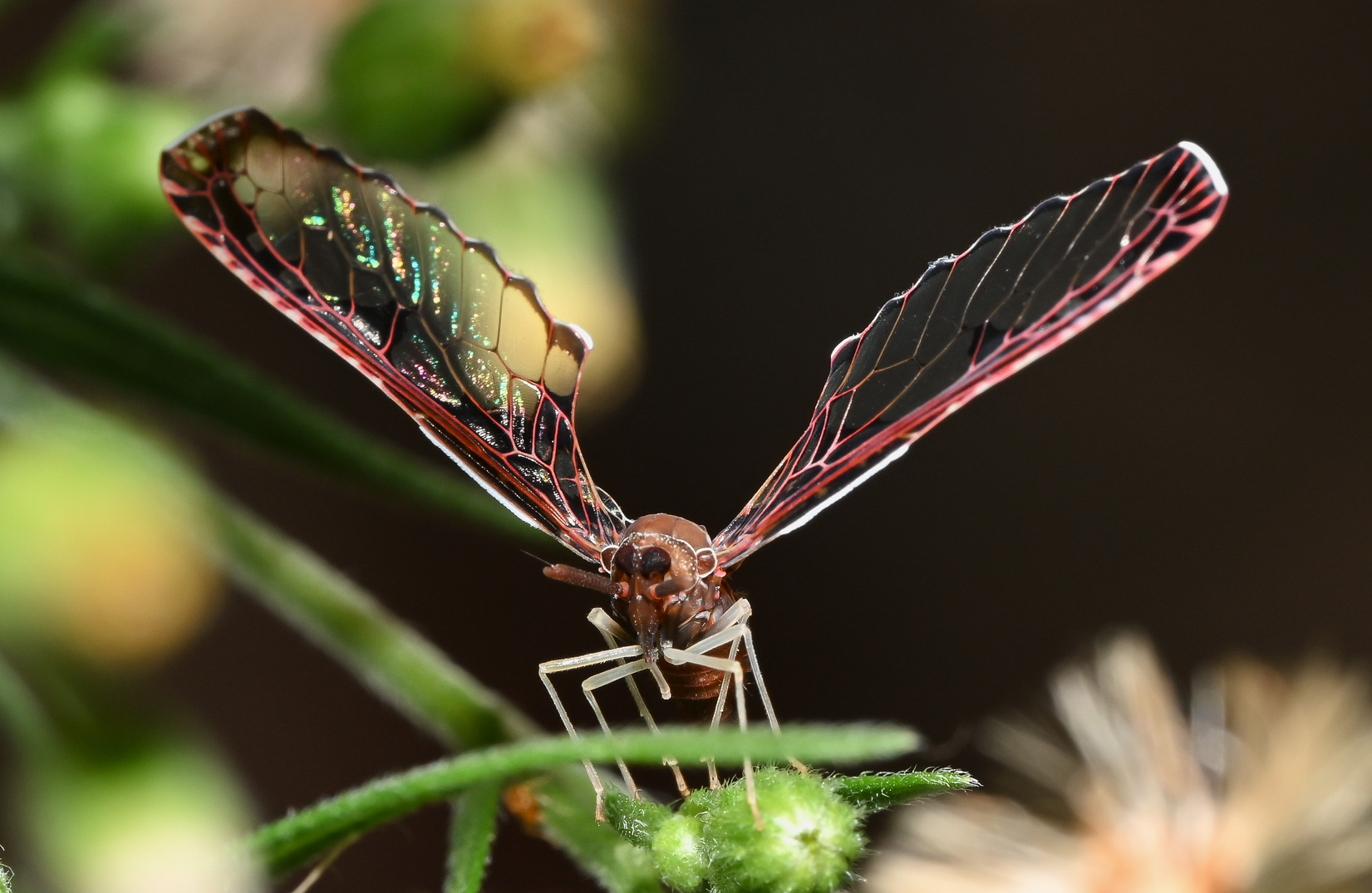
- Losbanosia species from China

Scientific classification
- Kingdom: Animalia
- Phylum: Arthropoda
- Class: Insecta
- Order: Hemiptera
- Suborder: Auchenorrhyncha
- Infraorder: Fulgoromorpha
- Family: Derbidae
- Subfamily: Otiocerinae
- Tribe: Zoraidini
- Genus: Losbanosia; Muir, 1917

Synonyms
- Nomuraida Matsumura, 1935

= Losbanosia =

Genus of planthoppers

Losbanosia is a small genus of planthoppers from the family Derbidae, tribe Zoraidini, currently (2024) with 5 species. The species are found in eastern Asia from Japan and southern parts of far-eastern Russia in the North to the Philippines and "Indo-China" in the South. They can be easily recognized by the wavy or serrated hind margin of the forewings which is unique in the tribe Zoraidini. The shape of the forewing is further unusual in its club-like outline, forming a distinct angle at the hind margin, around one third from the wing base. The hind wings are much shorter than half the forewing length, with a large anal area bearing a stridulation plate. Like in other genera of the tribe Zoraidini, live specimens of Losbanosia raise their wings above the body, but spread them out widely. The face is narrow and linear and the antennae are longer than the face. The typical colour of the body is brown to reddish brown, the legs and the rostrum are straw-coloured. The forewings are transparent with dark brown areas near the wing base, near the tip of the wing, along sections of the hind margin, as well as near the costal margin which connects to a triangular mark near the middle of the wing. The forewing veins are red in the dark brown areas, but yellowish in the transparent parts. All species of Losbanosia are similar in colouration and the species need to be identified by the structures on the tip of the male abdomen.

Type species: Losbanosia bakeri Muir, 1917

== Distribution ==
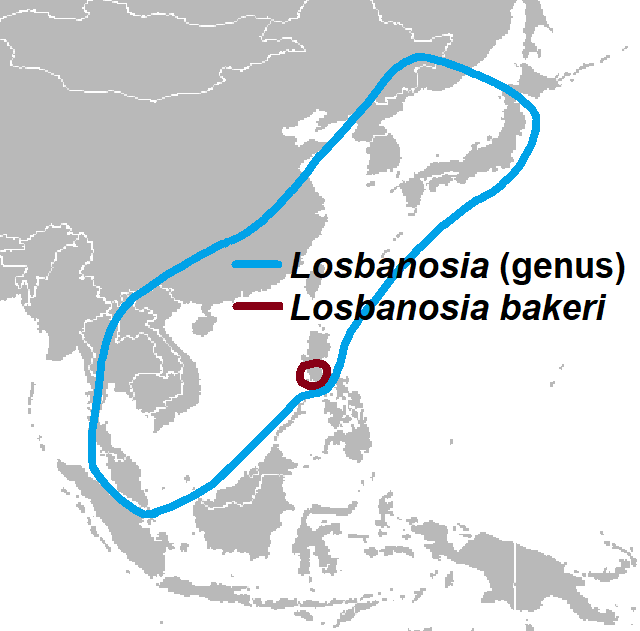
Distribution ranges of all species in the genus Losbanosia (blue outline) and that of Losbanosia bakeri, the type species (brown outline)

The description of the genus Losbanosia and its type species, Losbanosia bakeri, was based on female specimens that had been collected from Mount Makiling, about 50 km south of Manila in the Philippines. The genus was named after the nearby town of Los Baños. Other species of Losbanosia have been described from "Indo-China" (Losbanosia vuilleti), Vietnam near the border to China (Losbanosia tamdaoensis), Taiwan (Losbanosia taivaniae) and Japan (Losbanosia hibarensis). The latter species has been also reported from South Korea and southern parts of far-eastern Russia. Further, there are insects in some parts of China which clearly belong to the genus Losbanosia, but cannot be assigned to a species based on colouration alone. A record of Losbanosia bakeri from Kwangtung (Guangdong) in China is also doubtful, since it was based on a female specimen.

== Description ==
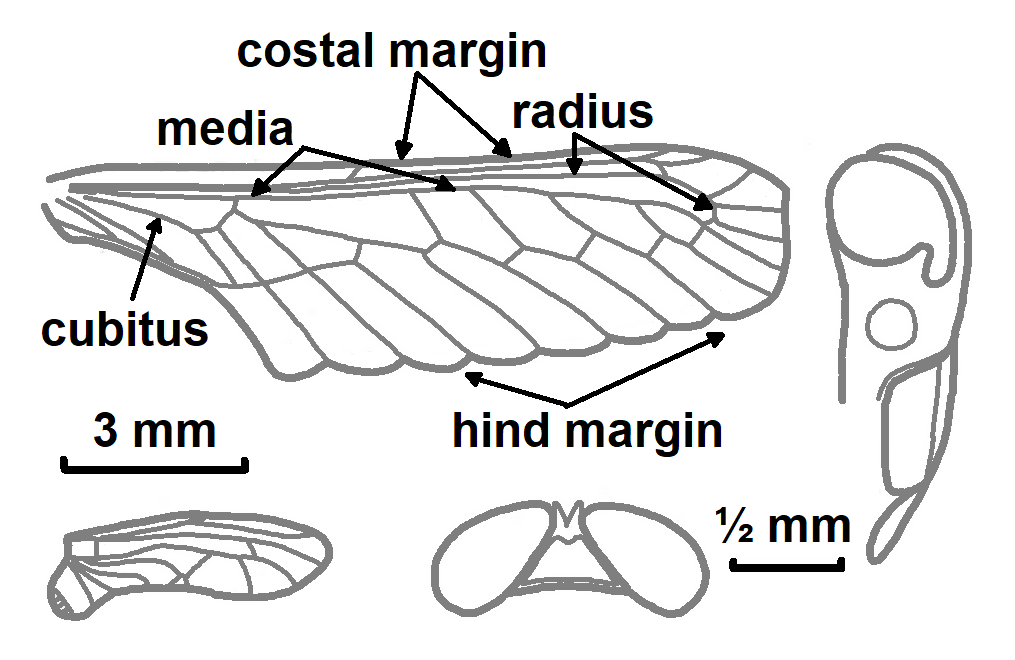
Wings and head of Losbanosia taivaniae. Left: forewing (top) and hind wing (bottom). Lower centre: head in dorsal view. Right: head in side view.

The most striking feature of species in the genus Losbanosia is the shape of the forewing, especially the wavy hind margin with the margin being indented at the end of each vein. This feature is unique among the genera in the tribe Zoraidini. In his original description of the genus, Muir called the hind margin "serrated". Further, the general outline of the forewing is also unusual. Its width increases rapidly in the basal third of the wing and then forms a distinct angle at the hind margin, about one third from the base. For the rest of the wing, the width remains about the same with the hind margin running approximately parallel to the costal margin. The tip of the forewing is truncated, giving the distal half of the forewing a somewhat rectangular appearance. The hind wing is much shorter than half the forewing length and has a large anal lobe at its base with a well developed stridulation area. As in other genera of the tribe Zoraidini, live Losbanosia species raise their wings above the body when at rest. However, they spread them out much wider than in other genera.

Losbanosia species have a body size of 4–5 mm and a forewing length of 10–12 mm. The head is narrower than the thorax. In dorsal view, the part between the eyes (the vertex) has a wide base that narrows to a blunt tip. In frontal view the face is narrow and linear and is bordered by ridges which meet or almost meet between the eyes. However, these ridges extend little in front of the eyes and the profile of the head is rather flat. The antennae are cylindrical and long, longer than the face.

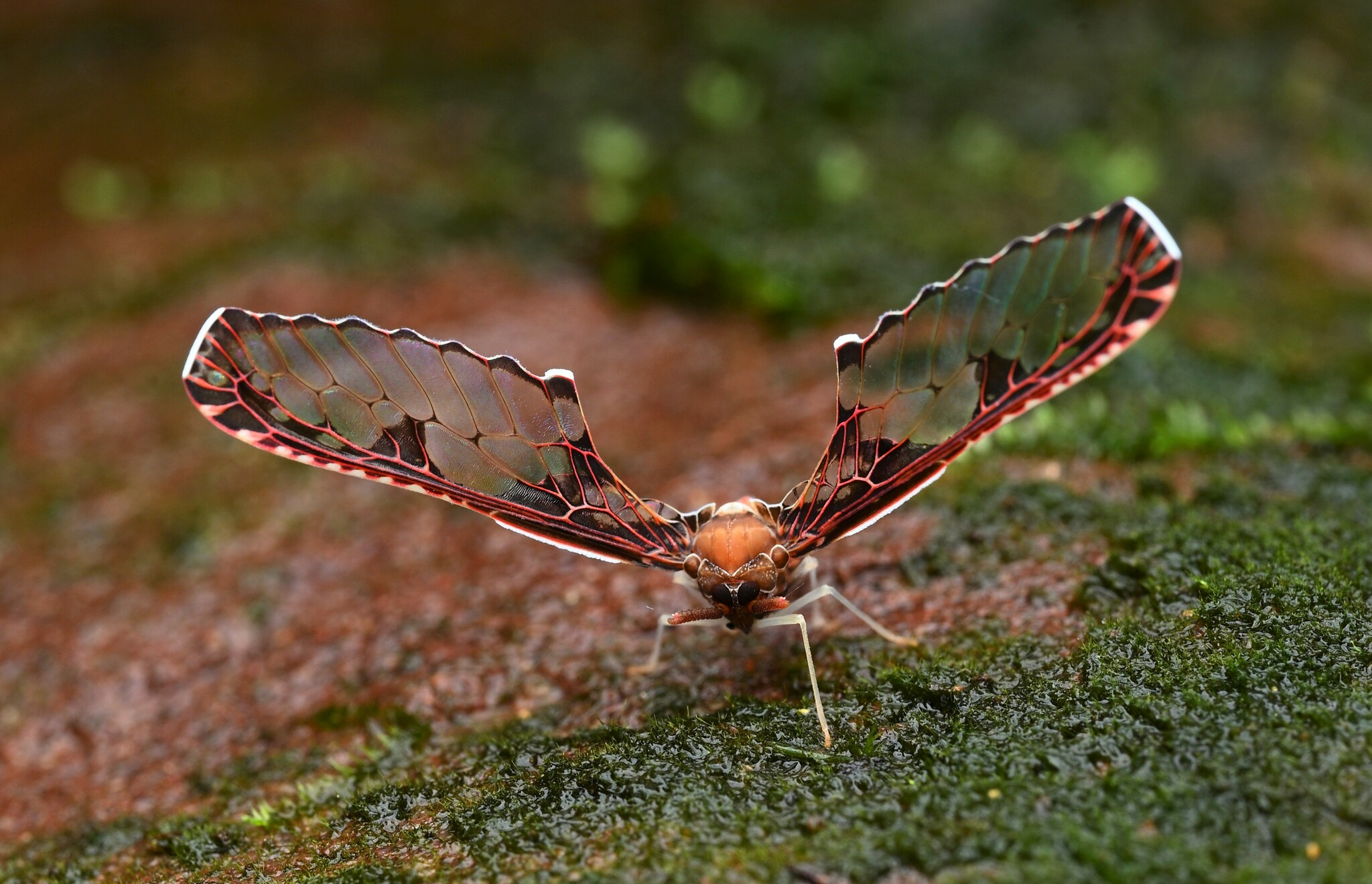
Losbanosia species from Hangzhou, China

From the descriptions and illustrations of the species of Losbanosia, the colouration appears to be uniform across the whole genus. Individual species can only be identified by the structures on the tip of the male abdomen. The general colour of the body is brown to reddish brown. The middle of the mesonotum and its ridges are lighter. The legs, the rostrum and the scutellum are straw-coloured. The sides of the body, the pronotum and the antennae are usually darker, but the tips of the antennae are lighter.

The forewings are transparent with dark brown areas and marks lining most of the outer margins. A dark brown triangle extends from the costal margin into the middle of the forewing. Further, there are some clear spots in the dark brown areas near the distal half of the costa and the wing tip. There is also a series of about 10 whitish spots along the costal margin. The veins are reddish in the dark brown areas, but more yellowish in the transparent parts. Some veins are lined with brown lines. In live specimens, there are also 3 conspicuous patches of white wax secretions on the outer margin of the forewing: along the basal third of the costal margin, the tip of the forewing and the angular section of the hind margin, about one third from the base. The hind wings are mainly transparent with reddish veins, but dark brown at the tip and with brown lines along some veins.

== Biology ==
Immature stages of Losbanosia have been found in rotten wood. They apparently breed in decaying organic matter like other derbids and feed on fungi. There seem to be no host plant records for the adult hoppers of any species in the genus Losbanosia.

== Taxonomy and species ==
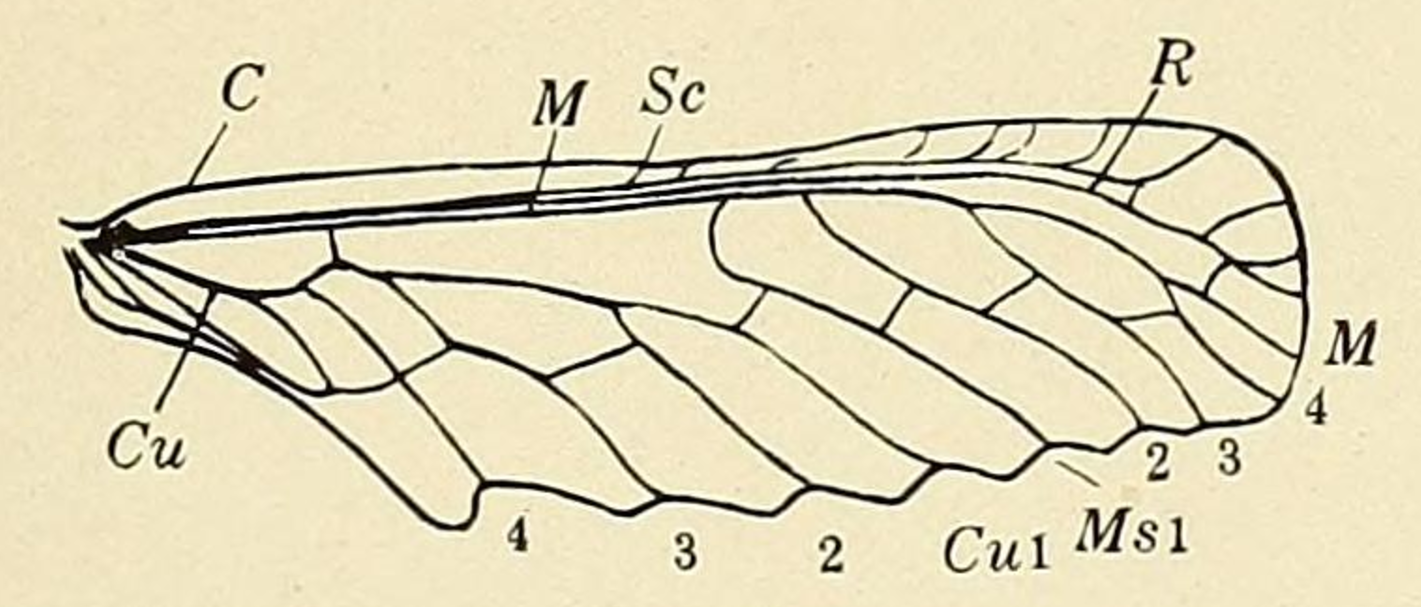
Forewing of Losbanosia bakeri from the Philippnies. This is the original drawing by Muir accompanying his description of the genus and the type species.

All insects in the genus Losbanosia have a similar colouration and appearance. For assigning them to a specific species they need to be identified by the structures on the tip of the male abdomen. However, no males are known for the 2 species which have been described first (L. bakeri and L. vuilleti). Therefore, the taxonomy of the 3 species of Losbanosia which have been described subsequently remains unresolved until males of L. bakeri and L. vuilleti have been described. Muir's original description of the type species, Losbanosia bakeri, in 1917 is very detailed, but since it was based on female specimens only, it is insufficient to characterize that species. No additional specimens of L. bakeri have been described or reported. Similarly, no males are known for Losbanosia vuilleti which was originally described by Distant as Zoraida vuilleti from "Indo-China" in 1914. Resolving the taxonomy of L. bakeri and L. vuiletti would ideally involve a comprehensive collection of Losbanosia specimens from the type localities as well as genetic comparisons of the collected and described males with specimens from the type series. Males are only known of the remaining 3 species of Losbanosia described subsequently in 1935 and 2004 (L. hibarensis from Japan, L. taivaniae from Taiwan and L. tamdaoensis from northern parts of Vietnam). They have been described and compared in detail, allowing these 3 species to be identified correctly.

The following list summarizes the taxonomy and distribution of the 5 species of Losbanosia:

Losbanosia bakeri Muir, 1917 TYPE SPECIES
Only known from the type locality in the Philippines and from female specimens.

Losbanosia hibarensis (Matsumura, 1935)
Basionym: Nomuraida hibarensis Matsumura, 1935
Described from Fukushima, Honshu, Japan, but also reported from South Korea as well as from southern parts of far-eastern Russia. A report from Taiwan was apparently based on a specimen of L. taivaniae.

Losbanosia taivaniae Szwedo & Adamczewska, 2004
Only known from Taiwan.

Losbanosia tamdaoensis Szwedo & Adamczewska, 2004
Described from Tam Đao in Vietnam (about 50 km NE of Hanoi). The distinction to Losbanosia vuilleti (Distant, 1914) which has also been described from the same region is unknown.

Losbanosia vuilleti (Distant, 1914)
Basionym: Zoraida vuilleti Distant, 1914
Described from "Indo-China" and only known from female specimens.
