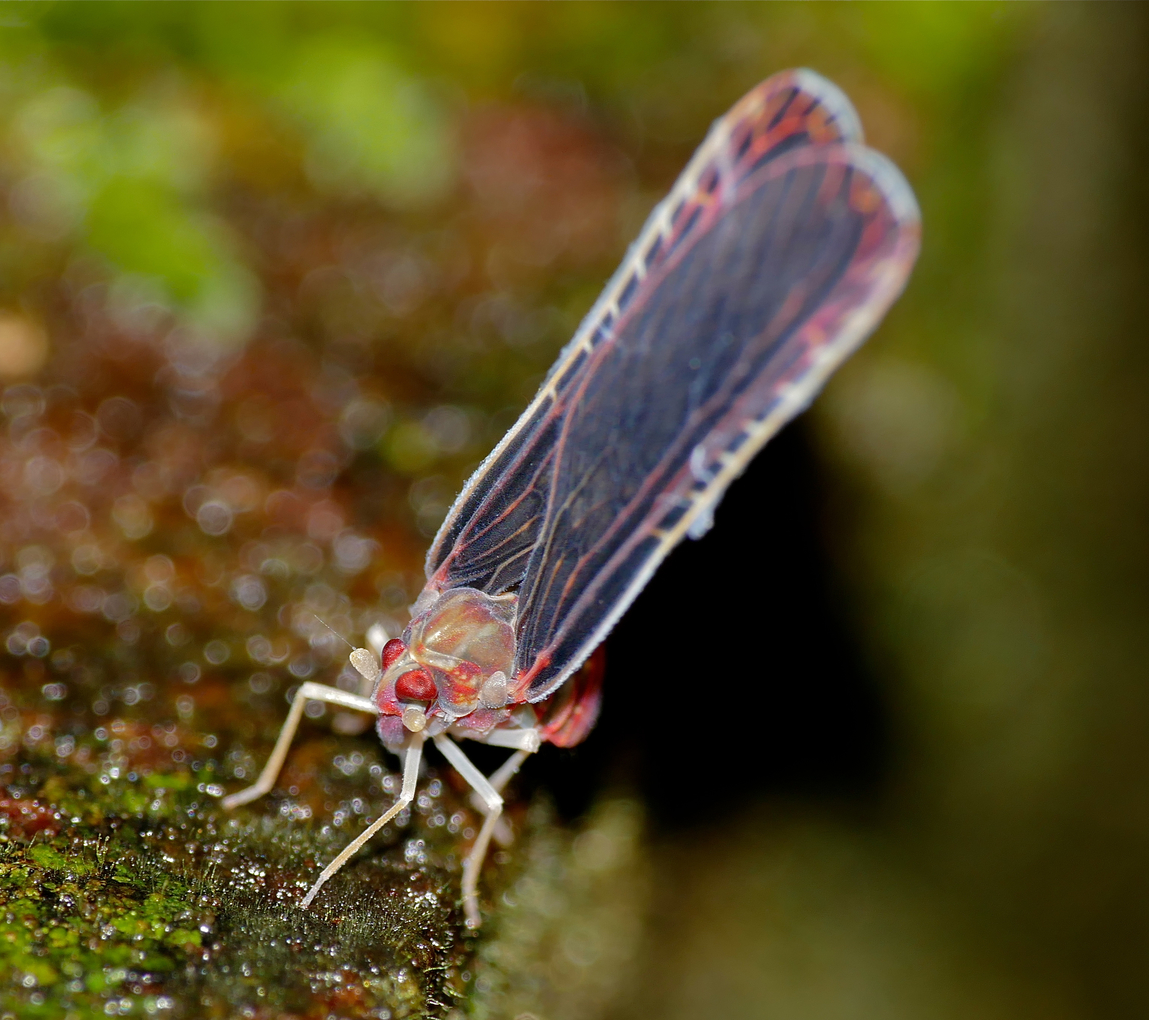
- Neoproutista species from Borneo

Scientific classification
- Kingdom: Animalia
- Phylum: Arthropoda
- Class: Insecta
- Order: Hemiptera
- Suborder: Auchenorrhyncha
- Infraorder: Fulgoromorpha
- Family: Derbidae
- Subfamily: Otiocerinae
- Tribe: Zoraidini
- Genus: Neoproutista; Yang & Wu, 1993

= Neoproutista =

Genus of planthoppers

Neoproutista is a small genus of planthoppers from the family Derbidae, tribe Zoraidini, currently (2024) with 6 described species. The species of the genus are found in southern Asia from India and Sri Lanka in the West to Taiwan and southern China in the East. In south-eastern Asia there are reports from Thailand, the southern Philippines, Malaysia, and parts of Indonesia (Kalimantan, Sumatra and Java). The species are similar to the species in the genus Pamendanga, but have much shorter antennae. Apparently, live specimens can be easily recognized by the way the insects usually carry their forewings when at rest. These are raised above the body like in other genera of Zoraidini, but are held close together, parallel to each other and overlapping each other. The general colouration of the body is typically brownish to black, sometimes with white or reddish marks. The forewings are black, dark brown or brown with white marks along the costal and apical margins. The veins are mainly brown to reddish brown. The hind wings are less than half as long as the forewings and are usually dark brown, often lighter near their base.

Type species: Paraproutista pseudoalbicosta Muir, 1915, a synonym of Neoproutista pseudoalbicosta

== Distribution ==
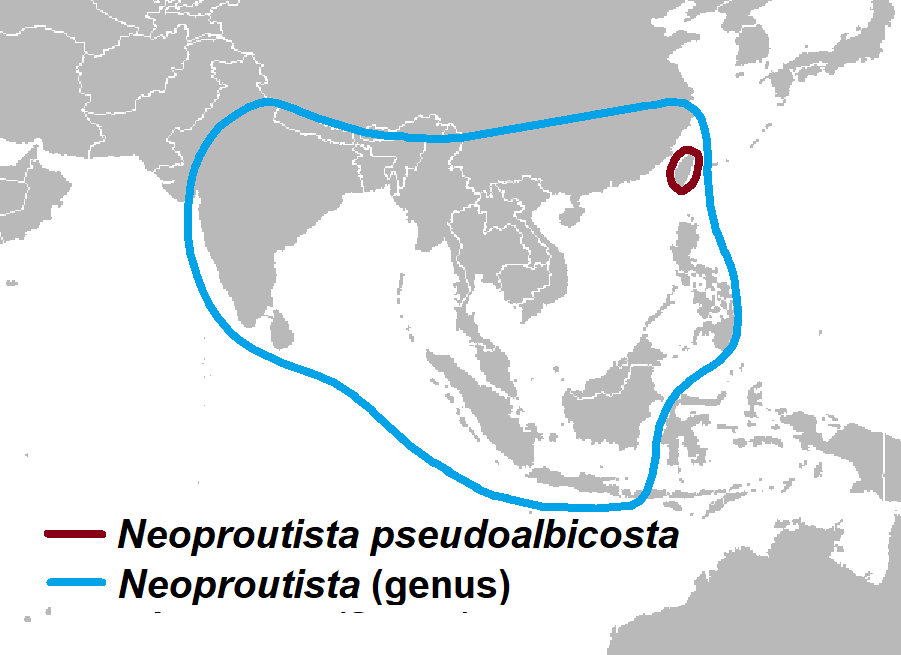
Distribution ranges of the species in the genus Neoproutista (blue outline) and that of Neoproutista pseudoalbicosta, the type species (brown outline)

In 1915, the type species of Neoproutista, Neoproutista pseudoalbicosta, was described from Taiwan under the name Paraproutista pseudoalbicosta. In 1911, Distant described Phenice pullata (now Neoproutista pullata) from Kumaon District in India, near the western border of Nepal. That species was later also reported from Assam in India. In 2003, four more species of Neoproutista were described, all from Yunnan Province in China. These taxonomic records suggest that Neoproutista species are distributed along a narrow strip, ranging from northern India, over south-western parts of China to Taiwan. However, judging from images published on the internet, the distribution range of Neoproutista species appears to be much wider, including most parts of India, Sri Lanka, most southern parts of China, Taiwan, Thailand, Malaysia, the southern Philippines and the western parts of Indonesia (Kalimantan, Sumatra and Java), possibly involving still undescribed species.

== Description ==
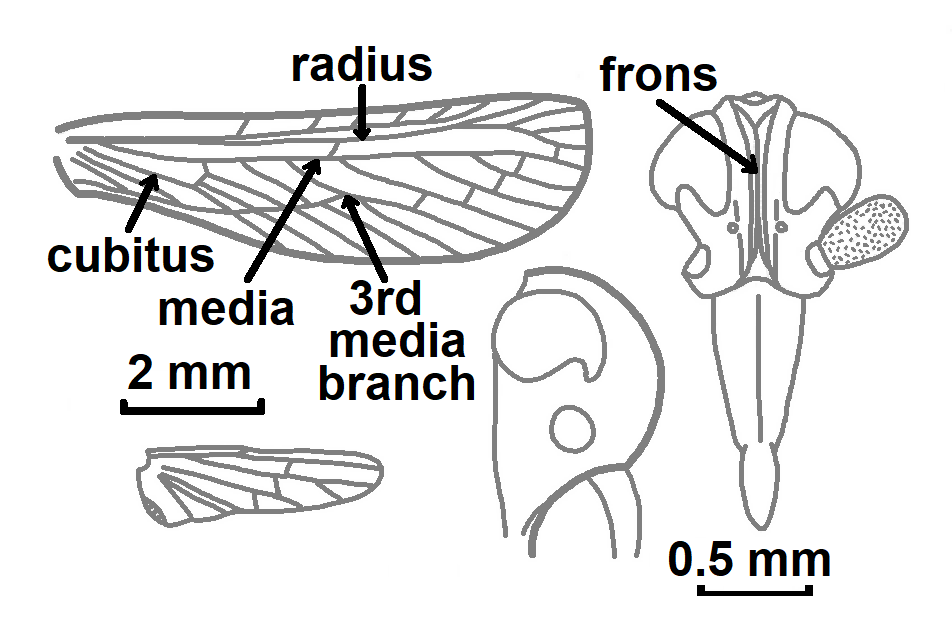
Wings and head of Neoproutista pseudoalbicosta. Left: venation of forewing (top) and hind wing (bottom). Centre bottom: head in profile. Right: head in frontal view.

Species of Neoproutista can be recognized by the combination of short antennae and their venation of the forewings. The forewing venation is similar to that in the genus Pamendanga with the media vein having 6 branches of which the third branch forks further into two sub branches. The radius has 3 branches near its tip. The hind wings are shorter than half the length of the forewings, with a rounded tip. Images of live specimens seem to suggest that when at rest, Neoproutista species raise their wings above the body, like in many other genera of Zoraidini. However, the position of the wings is unusual in that the wings are held close together, parallel to each other and overlapping each other. Species in other genera of Zoraidini like Pamendanga or Proutista usually spread out their forewings when at rest.

The length of the body, from head to the end of the abdomen, is around 3 mm and that of the forewings around 9 mm. The head including the eyes is narrower than the pronotum. In dorsal view, the head between the eyes (the vertex) is triangular or has a trapezoid shape. In frontal view the ridges on the sides of the face (frons) meet near the middle of the eyes. In profile the head is evenly rounded in front of the eyes. Ocelli are present just below the compound eyes near the face. The antennae are much shorter than the face with the 2nd segment being approximately egg-shaped. The size of the antenna is the main morphological difference to the species of Pamendanga, where the antennae are about as long as the face.

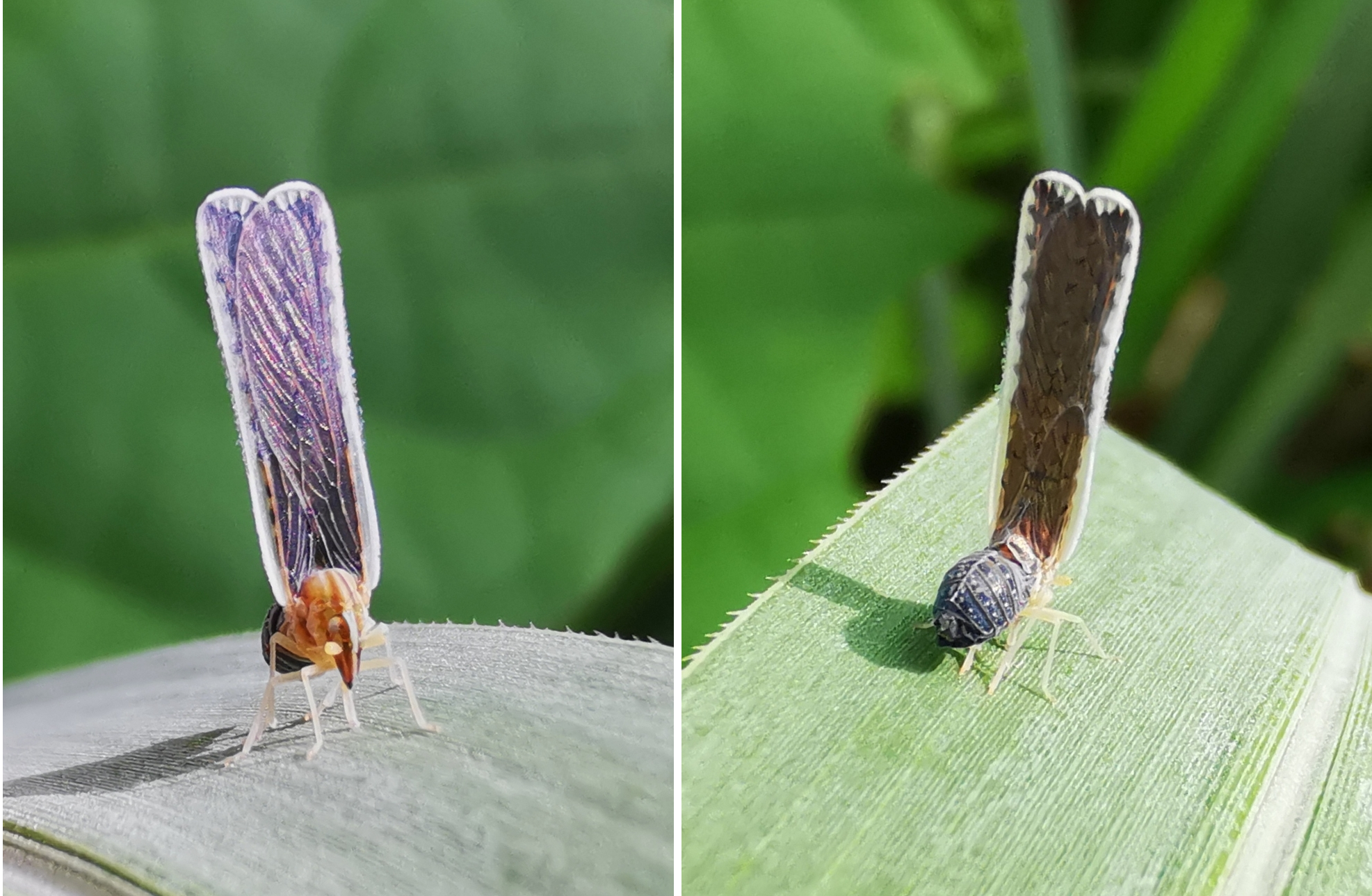
Neoproutista species from Thailand. Frontal view (left) and hind view (right) of same insect

The basic colour of the body of Neoproutista species ranges from light brown, over reddish brown and dark brown to almost black, often with some lighter marks or stripes. For example, the abdomen may have lighter spots and the ridges on the mesonotum and the clypeus may be lighter. The legs, the rostrum, the antennae and the margins of the facial ridges are typically straw-coloured to whitish. The forewings are usually dark brown to black with whitish outer margins and often with lighter areas along the costal and apical margins. The basal thirds of the forewings may be black. The veins may be light brown, red or reddish brown. The veins near the costal and apical margins can be whitish. The hind wings are also usually dark and often lighter near their bases.

== Biology ==
There is no information on the biology of the immature stages of Neoproutista species. However, it can be assumed that they live in decaying organic matter like other derbids, feeding on fungi. There also seem to be no host plant records for the adult hoppers of any species in the genus Neoproutista.

== Taxonomy and species ==
The name Neoproutista was apparently derived from the name Paraproutista, the genus under which the type species was originally described. Paraproutista is now regarded as a synonym for Pamendanga. In the original description, the authors of the genus mention the short antennae, the spines on the hind legs and the structure of the male aedeagus as main differences to the genus Pamendanga.

The following list summarizes the 6 species of Paraproutista:

Neoproutista acutata Wu & Liang, 2003
Described from Yunnan Province, China. Body yellowish brown to brown; antennae, ridges bordering face and ridges on mesonotum light yellow. Forewings brown, outer margins with whitish spots, veins brown.

Neoproutista bisaccata Wu & Liang, 2003
Described from Yunnan Province, China. Body brown; antennae and frons light brown; upper half of middle ridge of post-clypeus light yellow; ridges on mesonotum yellowish brown. Abdomen black. Forewings brown, near costal margin whitish, veins brown.

Neoproutista furva Wu & Liang, 2003
Described from Yunnan Province, China. Body dark brown; ridges on the mesonotum light brown; ridges bordering the vertex and face light yellow; legs yellow. Forewings brown and translucent, the outer margin whitish and the veins brown.

Neoproutista pseudoalbicosta (Muir, 1915) TYPE SPECIES
Paraproutista pseudoalbicosta Muir, 1915 (basionym)
Described from Taiwan. Body light to reddish brown, abdomen darker, antennae and legs lighter. Ridges on mesonotum, face and the middle ridge of post-clypeus whitish. Forewings dark brown to black with some scattered transparent areas; whitish spots along costal margin, veins reddish.

Neoproutista pullata (Distant, 1911)
Phenice pullata Distant, 1911 (basionym)
Phenice pallata (Distant, 1911) (misspelling)
Pamendanga pullata (Distant, 1911)
Pamendanga pallata (Distant, 1911) (misspelling)
Originally described from the Kumaon District in India (near the western border between India and Nepal), but later also reported from Assam in India and from Yunnan Province in China. Body dark brown to black, but legs straw-coloured. Antennae ochreous. Abdomen with lighter spots. Forewing dark brown. The costal margin whitish, interrupted by dark brown spots. Two white spots on the tip of the forewing.

Neoproutista spinellosa Wu & Liang, 2003
Described from Yunnan Province, China. Body yellowish brown, vertex and antennae lighter. Abdomen blackish brown, the upper parts (tergites) with rows of yellow spots.
