= Paraperipatus ceramensis =

Scientific classification
- Kingdom: Animalia
- Phylum: Onychophora
- Family: Peripatopsidae
- Genus: Paraperipatus
- Species: P. ceramensis

Binomial name
- Paraperipatus ceramensis (Muir & Kershaw, 1909)

Synonyms
- Peripatus ceramensis Muir & Kershaw, 1909

Species of basal Peripatopsid velvet worm

Paraperipatus ceramensis is a species of velvet worm in the family Peripatopsidae. This species is grey-green with rust speckles. Females of this species have 21 or 22 pairs of legs (usually 21) and range from 13 mm to 55 mm in length. The type locality is in Seram, Indonesia.
