= Paraperipatus lorentzi =

Scientific classification
- Kingdom: Animalia
- Phylum: Onychophora
- Family: Peripatopsidae
- Genus: Paraperipatus
- Species: P. lorentzi

Binomial name
- Paraperipatus lorentzi Horst, 1910

Species of basal Peripatopsid velvet worm

Paraperipatus lorentzi is a species of velvet worm in the Peripatopsidae family. This species is a dark green-blue. Females of this species have 22 to 28 pairs of legs; males have 21 or 22 pairs of legs. Whereas the original description of this species records 19 mm as the length of a male specimen, females range from 33 mm to 60 mm in length. The type locality is in Western New Guinea, Indonesia. The validity of this species is uncertain: Although some authorities deem P. lorentzi to be a junior synonym of P. papuensis, a similar species also found in Western New Guinea, others recognize them as two separate species.
