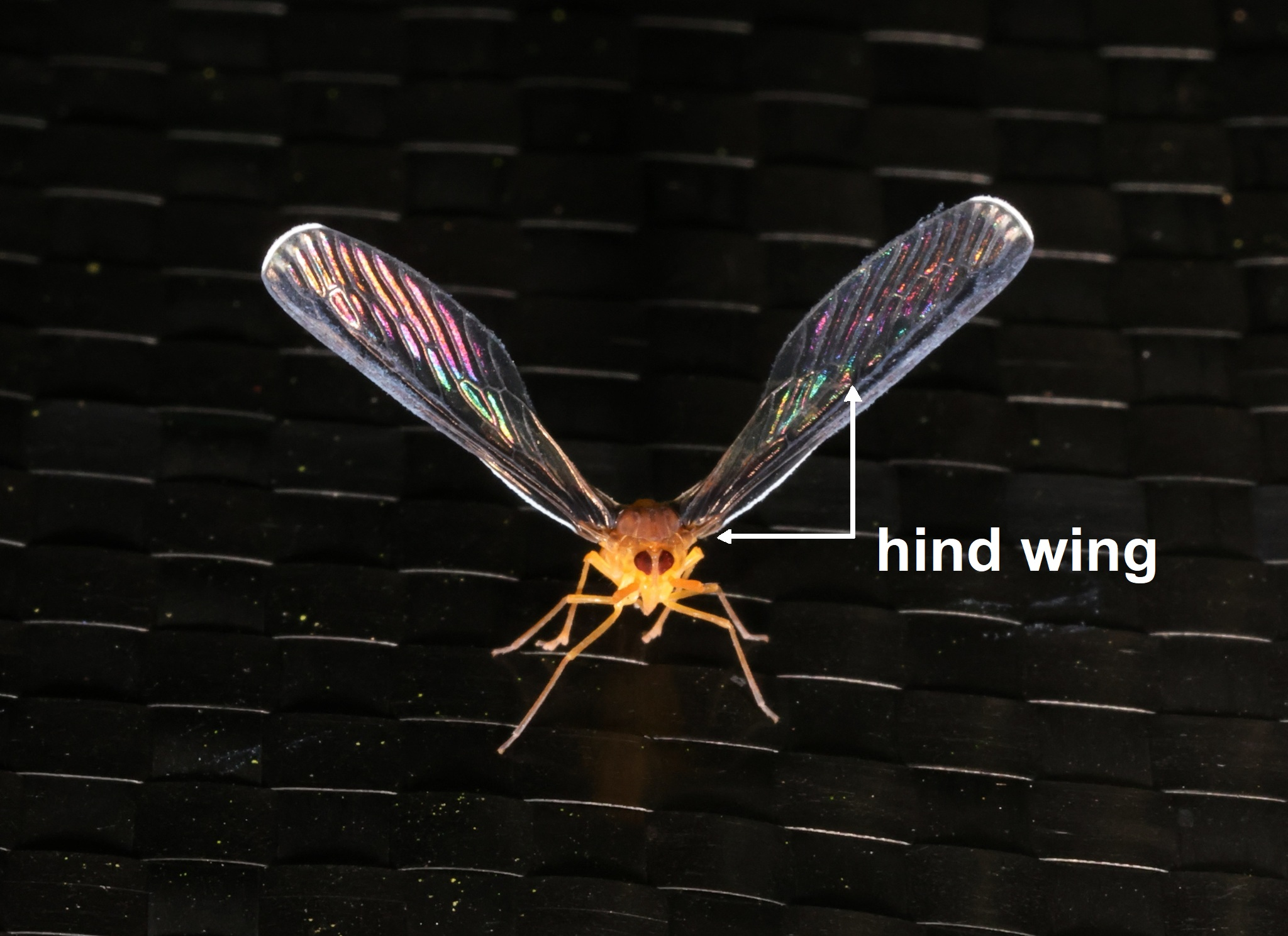
- Zoraida pterophoroides with hind wing marked

Scientific classification
- Kingdom: Animalia
- Phylum: Arthropoda
- Class: Insecta
- Order: Hemiptera
- Suborder: Auchenorrhyncha
- Infraorder: Fulgoromorpha
- Family: Derbidae
- Subfamily: Otiocerinae
- Tribe: Zoraidini; Muir, 1918

= Zoraidini =

Tribe of true bugs

The Zoraidini is a group (tribe) of planthoppers in the family Derbidae. They are found in tropical and subtropical parts of Africa, Asia, Australia and in parts of the western Pacific. Almost 300 species in 27 genera are recognized (as of 2024). They are characterized by their long and narrow forewings and the short hind wings, usually not longer than half the length of the forewings and often even shorter. The forewings are typically around 8–10 mm long and the body is usually not more than half that length. In most species, the wings are raised when the insects are at rest, and are often spread out at an angle of about 45–90°. The head is compressed and the face is narrow in frontal view. The antennae are often long and the eyes cover about half the face. Like in other derbids, the adults suck the sap of plants while the nymphs live mainly in decaying organic matter. A few species are regarded as minor agricultural pests.

Type species: Derbe sinuosa Boheman, 1838 (the type species of the genus Zoraida)

== Distribution ==
The species of Zoraidini are found in tropical and some sub tropical regions of Africa, Asia, Australia and western Pacific islands. In Africa, most species have been described from tropical parts of western and central Africa, but some also from eastern countries like Ethiopia and as far south as Mozambique and Madagascar. In Asia, Australia and the Pacific, the distribution of species from the tribe Zoraidini ranges from India and Sri Lanka in the West to the western Pacific (Indonesia, Guam, the Philippines) as far south as Papua New Guinea, the Solomon Islands and northern Australia. In eastern Asia, they have been also reported from subtropical regions as far north as parts of Japan and south-eastern Russia. Most species have been only reported from a few locations, but some have a wider distribution. For example, Proutista moesta is known from many parts of southern Asia and the western Pacific, ranging from the Seychelles, India and Sri Lanka in the West over the southern Asian mainland and Indonesia to the Philippines, southern China, Taiwan, southern Japan and Guam in the East.

== Description ==
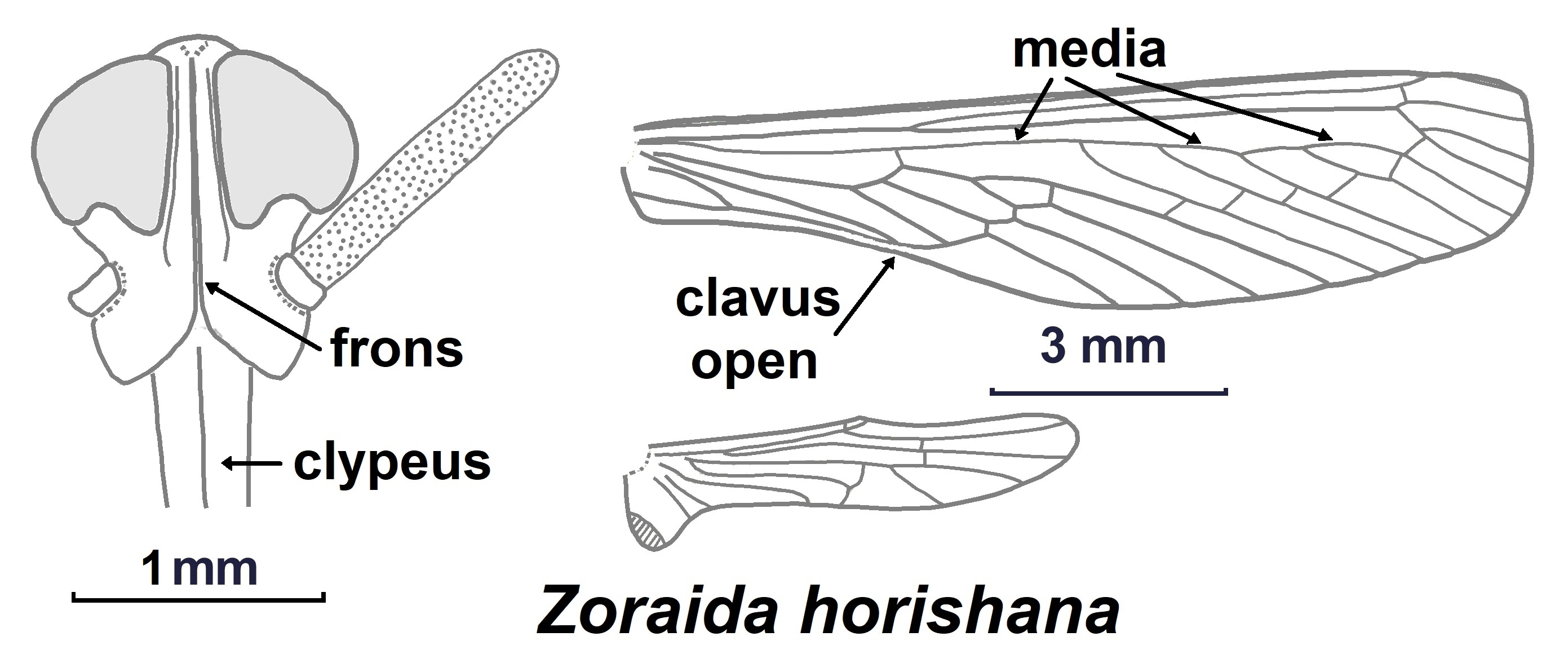
Zoraida horishana - Left: head in frontal view, Right: venation in forewing (top) and hind wing (bottom)

The tribe Zoraidini is characterized by a combination of several features which include:

- The forewings are long and narrow, at least double as long as the hind wings, while the hind wings are unusually short and also narrow.
- The head has a narrow face in frontal view and the eyes are only about half as long as the face and do not reach the clypeus.
- The antennae are typically long, often longer than the face.

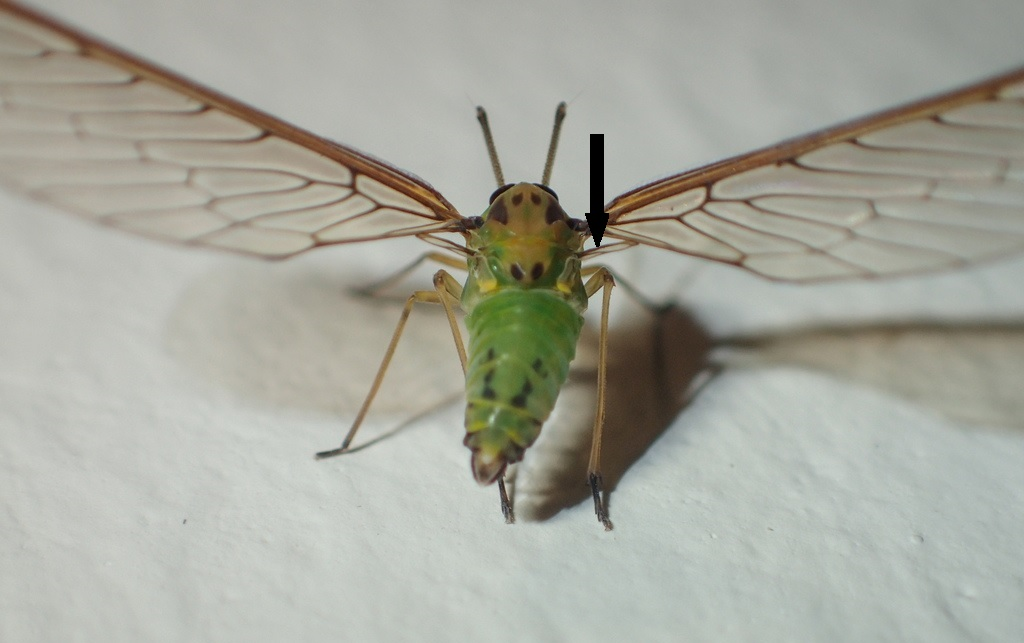
A species of Zoraidini (Peggia?) with arrow pointing at the very short hind wing

The long and narrow forewings, combined with the very short and also narrow hind wings, are the most important features of the tribe Zoraidini. The length of the hind wings is always given as not longer than half the forewing length. In the type specimen of Zoraida sinuosa (Derbe sinuosa) the length of the hind wing is about 40% the length of the forewing. However, in some genera and species, the hind wings can be much smaller, less than one fifth of the forewing length. The photograph on the left shows a specimen with such very small hind wings (indicated by an arrow). That specimen comes close to the genus Peggia. Peggia nitida (Stål, 1870), the only species described in that genus, has a hind wing length which is only about 10% of the forewing length.

Like in other groups of the subfamily Otiocerinae, the hindwings always have a stridulation plate on the inner margin, and in the case of the Zoraidini, the stridulation area is characterized by having an outer convex margin. In cases where the hindwings are extremely small, they are unlikely to have a role in the flight of the insects and probably only serve as a communication (stridulation) organ. The forewing venation in the tribe Zoraidini is characterized by an open clavus, meaning that the clavus vein does not reach the hind margin, but joins the veins of the cubitus (see illustration above). The media has 4 to 6 branches, one or more of which are usually forked. The forewings are 3 to 5 times longer than wide, on average 3.5 times.

The main feature of the head is the narrow, compressed face (frons), typically with the ridges on the side (facial carinae) nearly or completely meeting throughout most of its length. The facial carinae very rarely extend much further in front of the eyes, unlike in some other groups of Derbidae and the profile of the head is typically flat and usually evenly rounded. The size of the eyes covers about half the length of the face and the lower margins of the eyes do not approach the clypeus like in the sister tribe Sikaianini. The antennae are often long like in the type genus Zoraida and they are not branched like in other groups of Derbidae. In some species they are broad and extremely flat. There are no cup-like processes at the base of the antennae (subantennal processes) like in many other groups of Derbidae. The size of the insects depends on the genus and species and can also differ between males and females. On average the forewings are between 7 and 12 mm long, in contrast to the compact body which is usually not more than half that length, from the head to the end of the abdomen.

In most genera, the forewings are raised when the insects are at rest and usually they are spread out at an angle of about 45–90° (see the gallery below). The species also show a large variation in colours, although they typically lack the spectacular colour patterns found in some other groups of Derbidae.

Diversity of forms and colours in the tribe Zoraidini

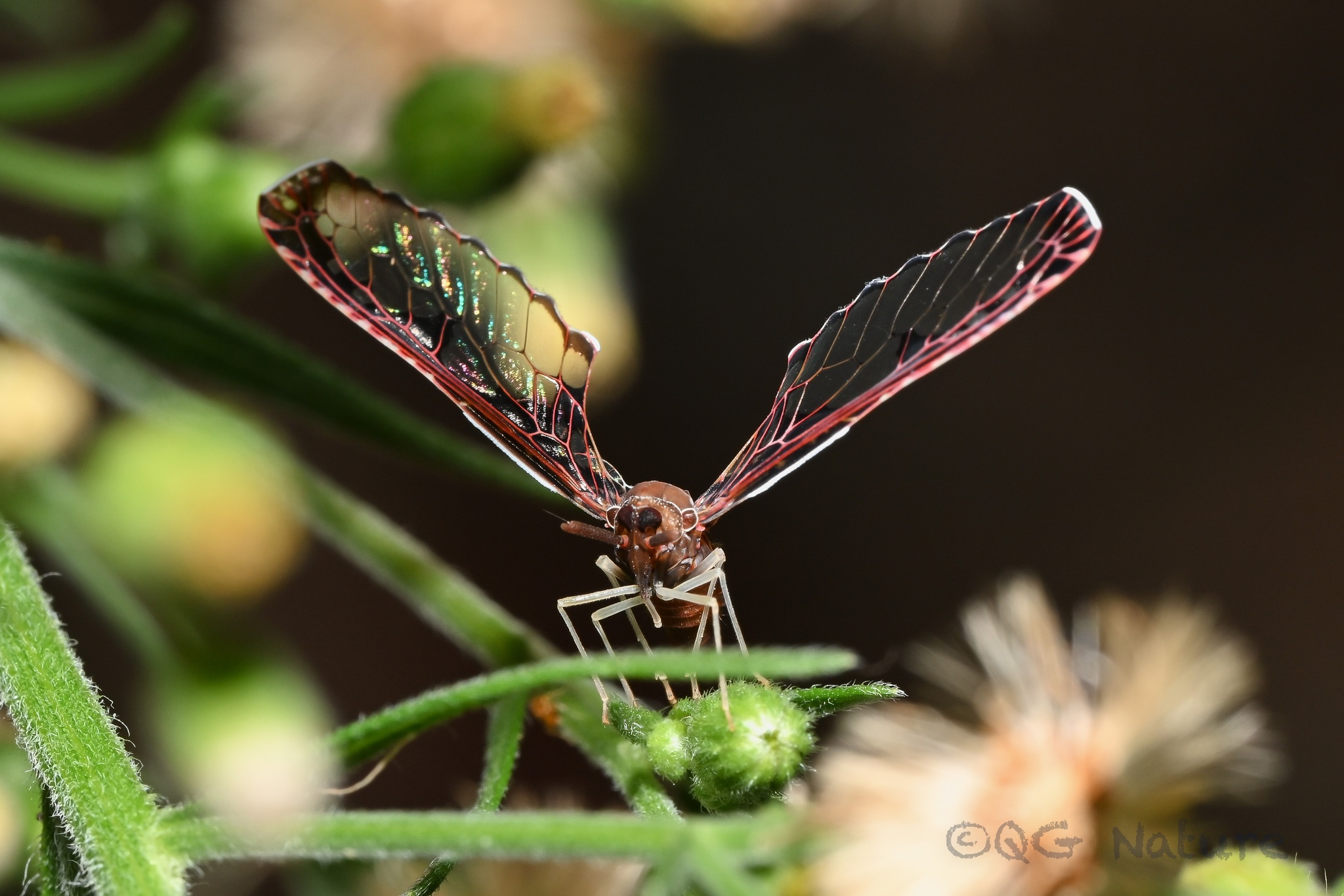
Losbanosia hibarensis

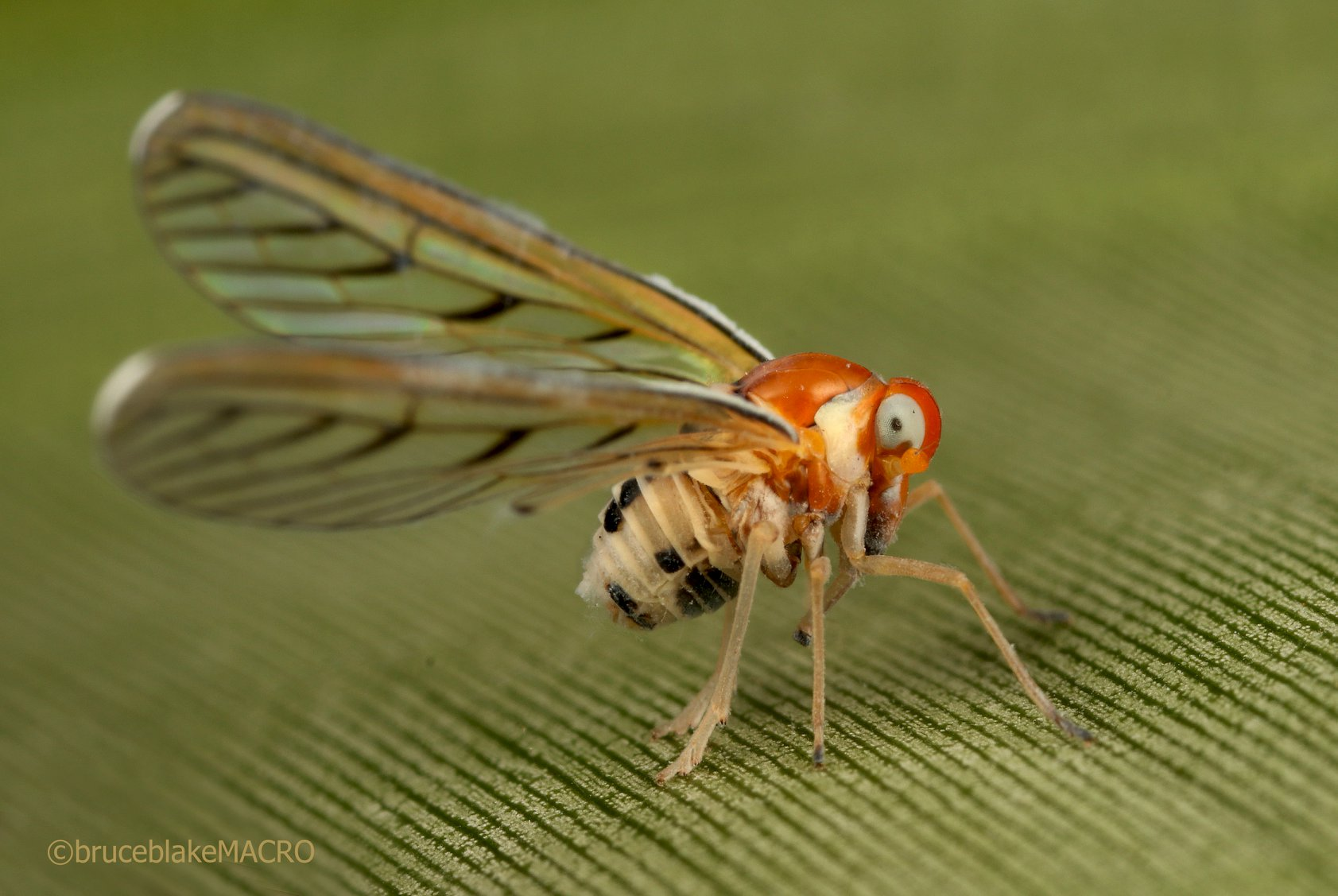
Diostrombus abdominalis

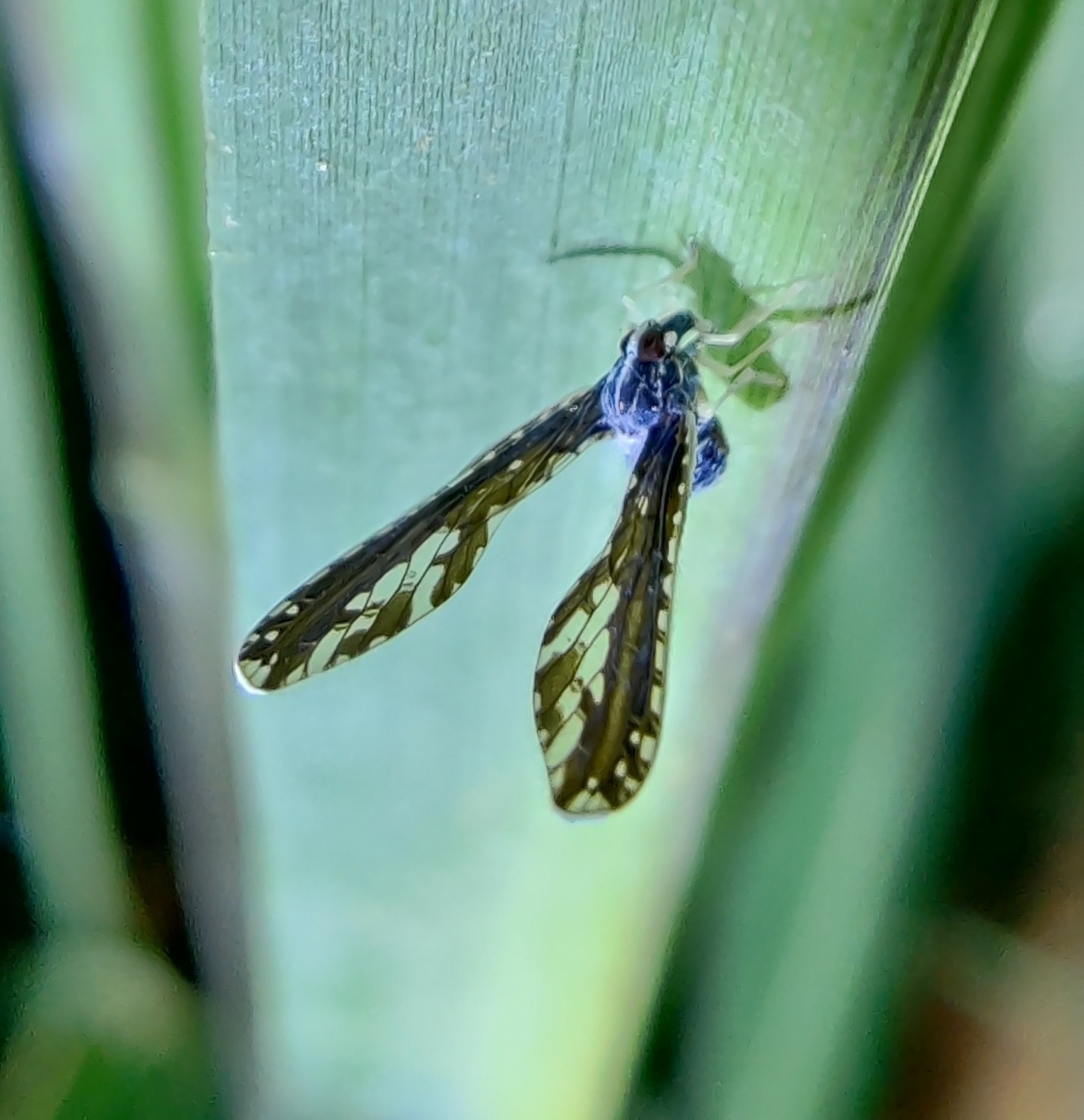
Proutista moesta in India

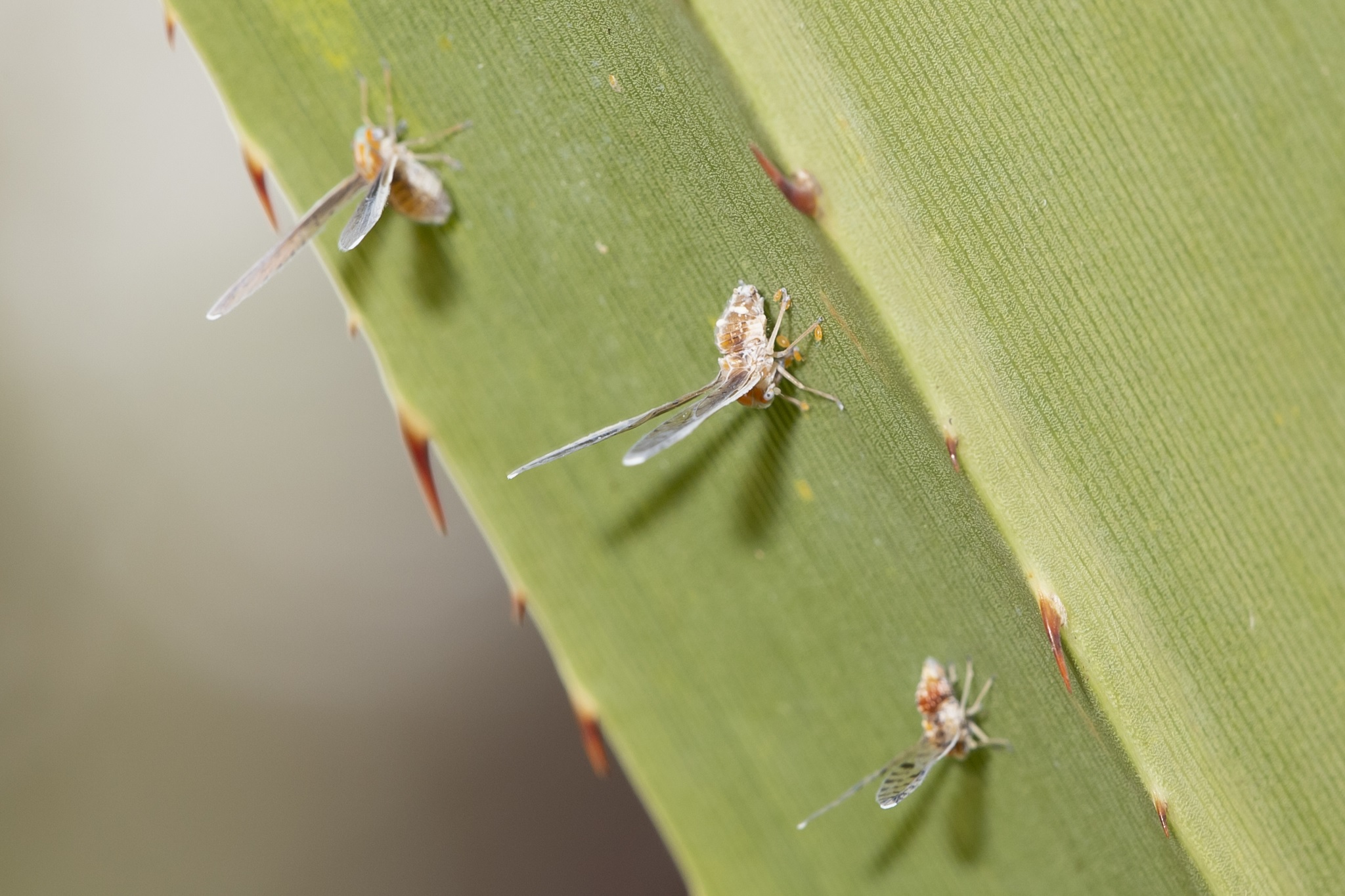
Lydda elongata in Australia

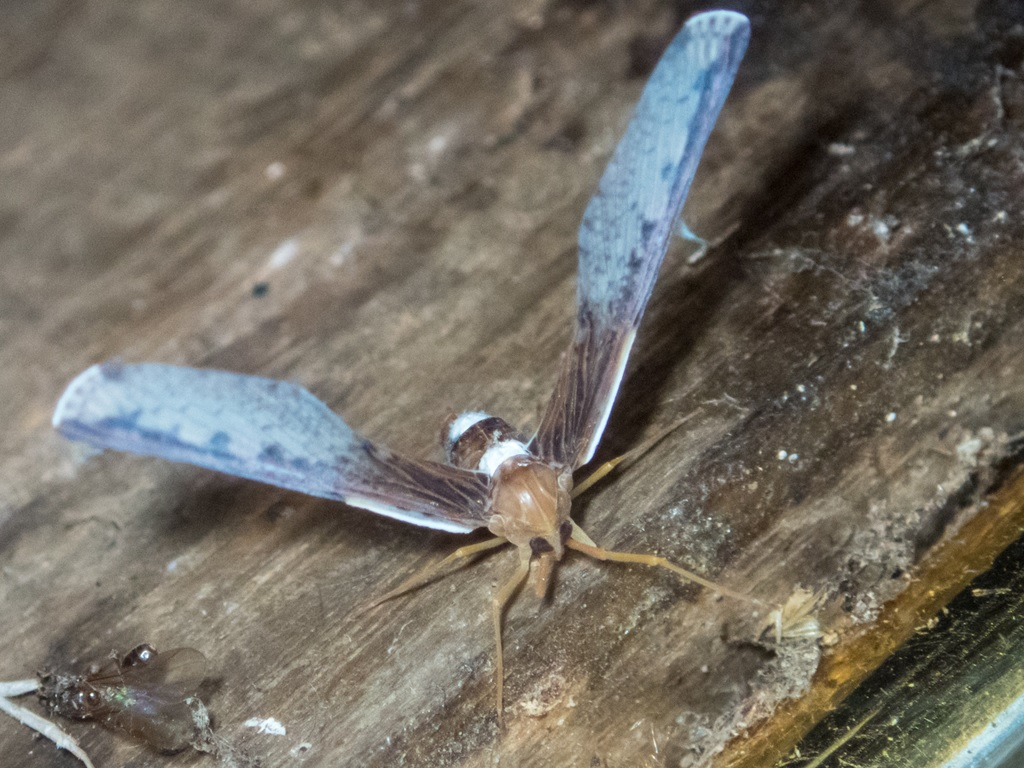
Zoraida species from Cambodia

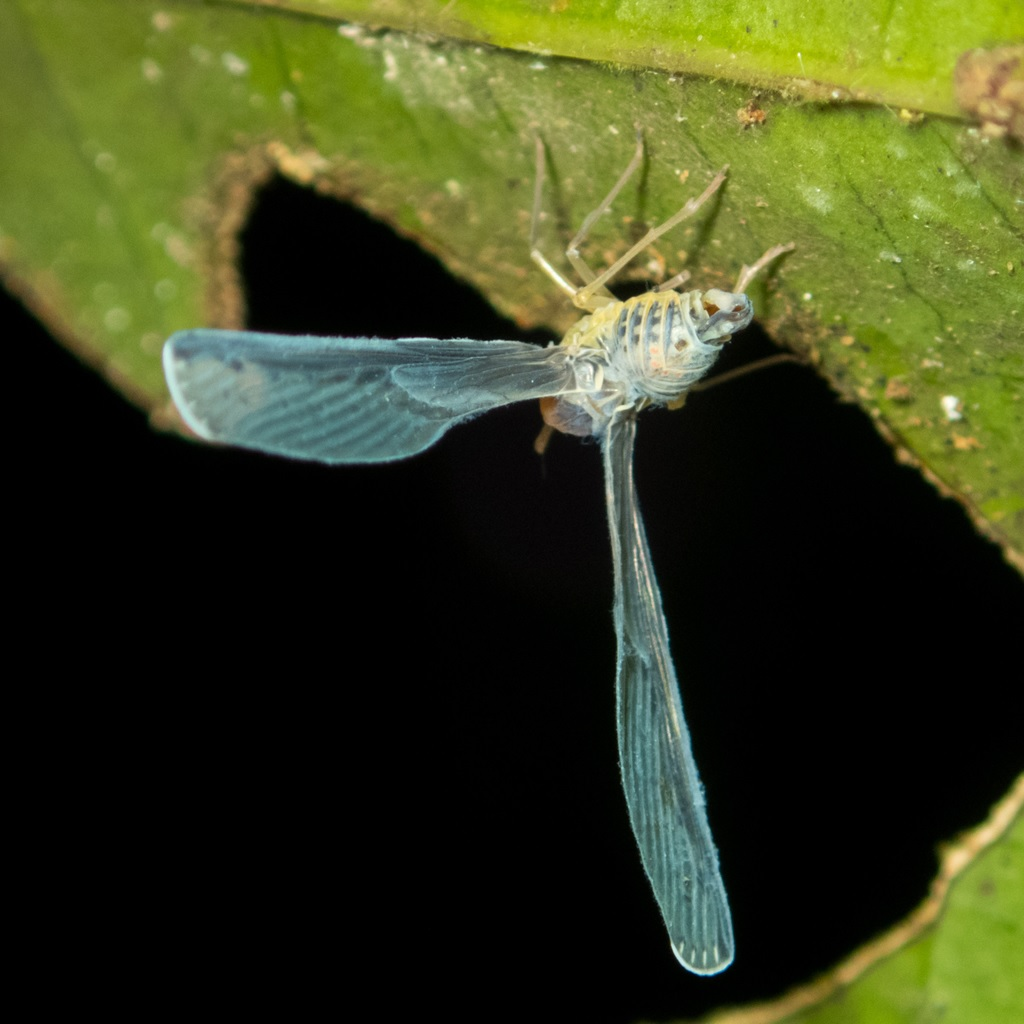
Planthopper from the tribe Zoraidini showing the short hind wings

== Biology ==
The host plants and the biology of the species of Zoraidini have not been well studied. Nymphs of Zoraida have been found in decaying tree trunks, where they presumably feed on fungi. Several species seem to be common on coconut or other palms and in Asia Proutista moesta is regarded as harmful to sugarcane in several countries. However, that species also feeds on other plants like palms. Further, some species could be involved in the transmission of plant diseases to coconut palms and sugarcane.

== Taxonomy and genera ==
The species of Zoraidini are most similar to those of the tribe Sikaianini and previously, both tribes had been grouped under a separate subfamily, the Zoraidinae. The main distinguishing feature is the shape and size of the eyes. In the Sikaianini, the lower margins of the eyes reach the base of the clypeus.

In the tribe Zoraidini, 27 genera and almost 300 species have been described (as of 2024). The genus Zoraida is by far the largest genus, with more than 100 species, followed by the genera Diostrombus and Pamendanga. All three genera are found in Africa as well as in Asia.

Selected genera of Zoraidini: in the following, genera with only 1 or 2 species are not listed

- Diostrombus Uhler, 1896
- Helcita Stål, 1856
- Losbanosia Muir, 1917
- Lydda Westwood, 1840
- Lyddastrombus Van Stalle, 1992
- Neodiostrombus Muir, 1918
- Neoproutista Yang & Wu, 1993
- Pamendanga Distant, 1906
- Proutista Kirkaldy, 1904
- Zeugma Westwood, 1840
- Zoraida Kirkaldy, 1900
