= Paraperipatus vanheurni =

Scientific classification
- Kingdom: Animalia
- Phylum: Onychophora
- Family: Peripatopsidae
- Genus: Paraperipatus
- Species: P. vanheurni

Binomial name
- Paraperipatus vanheurni Horst, 1922

Species of basal Peripatopsid velvet worm

Paraperipatus vanheurni is a species of velvet worm in the Peripatopsidae family. This species ranges from pale blue or lilac to dark purple in color. Females of this species have 25 to 27 pairs of legs; males have 21 (or 22, counting a rudimentary last pair without feet). This species ranges from 15 mm to 60 mm in length. The type locality is in Western New Guinea, Indonesia.
