= Paraperipatus novaebritanniae =

Scientific classification
- Kingdom: Animalia
- Phylum: Onychophora
- Family: Peripatopsidae
- Genus: Paraperipatus
- Species: P. novaebritanniae

Binomial name
- Paraperipatus novaebritanniae (Willey, 1898)

Synonyms
- Peripatus novaebritanniae (Willey, 1898); Peripatus (Paraperipatus) novaebritannae (Willey, 1898)

Species of basal Peripatopsid velvet worm

Paraperipatus novaebritanniae is a species of velvet worm in the Peripatopsidae family. This species is black with brown-yellow spots. Females of this species have 24 pairs of legs; males have 22 or 23 leg pairs. Females range from 14 mm to 55 mm in length, whereas males range from 14 mm to 26 mm. The type locality is in New Britain, Papua New Guinea.
