= Paraperipatus keiensis =

Scientific classification
- Kingdom: Animalia
- Phylum: Onychophora
- Family: Peripatopsidae
- Genus: Paraperipatus
- Species: P. keiensis

Binomial name
- Paraperipatus keiensis Horst, 1923

Species of basal Peripatopsid velvet worm

Paraperipatus keiensis is a species of velvet worm in the Peripatopsidae family. Females of this species can feature either 24 or 25 pairs of legs, whereas males can feature either 22 or 23 leg pairs. The type locality is in Kai Besar in Indonesia.

== Discovery ==
This species was first described in 1923 by the Dutch zoologist Rutger Horst. He based the original description of this species on ten specimens (six females and four males). These specimens were found in 1922 under stones and fallen branches in the woods (at an altitude of about 300 m) on Gunung Daab, a mountain on Kai Basar (Great Kai island) in Indonesia.

== Description ==
Horst reports that his female specimens have 24 or 25 pairs of legs, with three specimens featuring each number, but the males have 22 or 23 leg pairs. The last pair of legs are shorter but also have claws. Each foot has three spinous pads. The distal pad about as wide as the proximal pad, but the middle pad is twice as wide as the other two. The nephridial tubercle on the fourth and fifth leg pairs are connected with the proximal pad. Each foot has three distal papillae that are notably long and slim.

The females range from 27 mm to 48 mm in length and from 3 mm to 5 mm in width, whereas the males range from 25 mm to 33 mm in length and from 2 mm to 2.5 mm in width. When preserved in an ethanol solution, the dorsal surface of this velvet worm is green-black with yellow-brown spots, and the ventral surface is a light greyish blue, slightly speckled, with a row of large whitish spots along the midline between each pair of legs. The inner jaw blade features seven to nine accessory teeth in addition to the main tooth with no diastema, whereas the outer jaw blade features only the main tooth.
