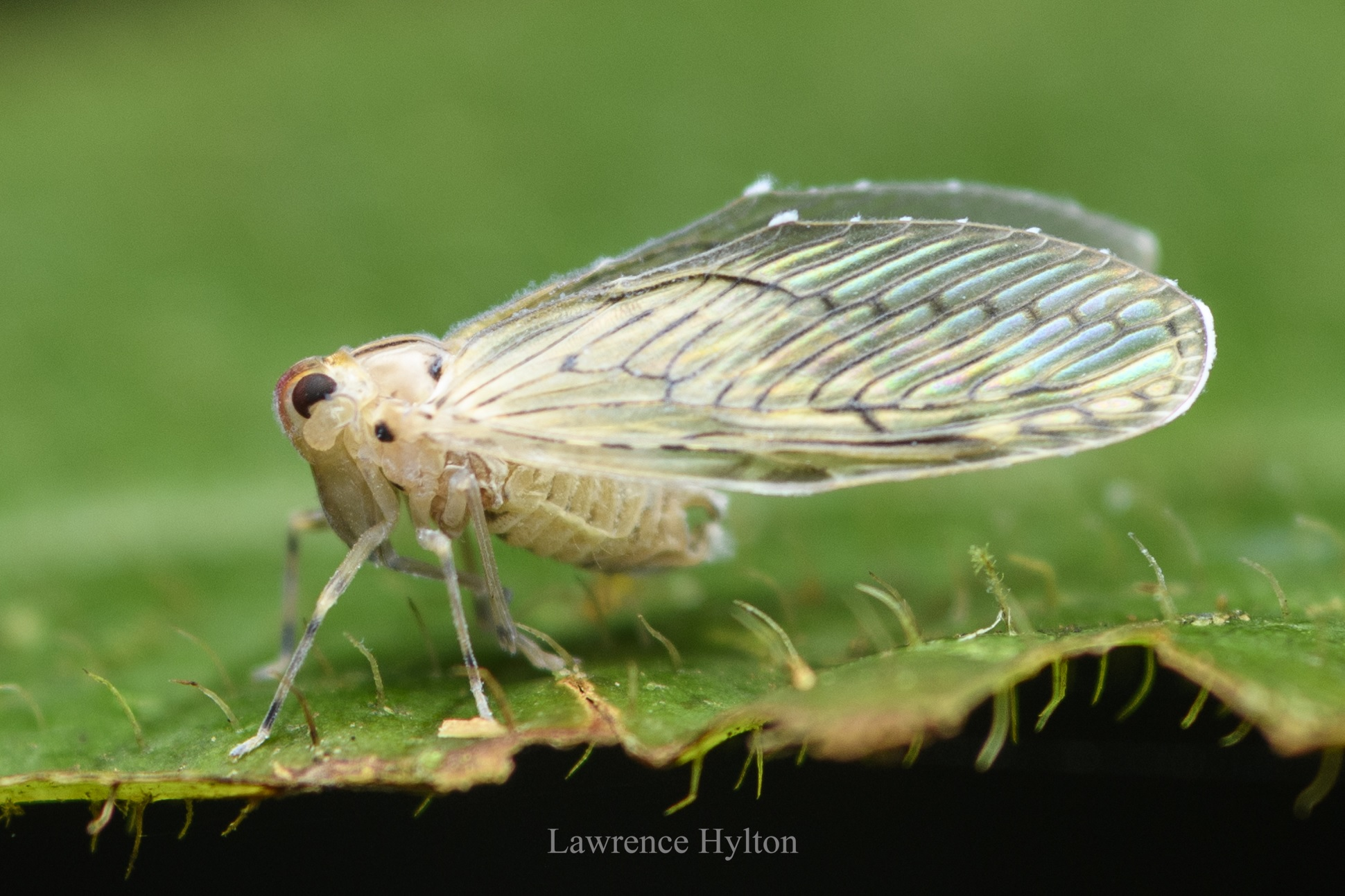
- Species of Zeugma from Thailand

Scientific classification
- Kingdom: Animalia
- Phylum: Arthropoda
- Clade: Pancrustacea
- Class: Insecta
- Order: Hemiptera
- Suborder: Auchenorrhyncha
- Infraorder: Fulgoromorpha
- Family: Derbidae
- Subfamily: Otiocerinae
- Tribe: Zoraidini
- Genus: Zeugma; Westwood, 1840

= Zeugma (planthopper) =

Genus of planthoppers

Zeugma is a small genus of planthoppers from the family Derbidae, tribe Zoraidini, currently (2024) with 9 species. The distribution of the species is restricted to western and central parts of Indonesia, as well as to tropical parts of southern Asia, mainly in and around Malaysia, southern Thailand and southern Cambodia. However, some species are also found in the Philippines, Taiwan and in Assam (India). The species of the genus Zeugma differ from the typical genera in the tribe Zoraidini by a number of unusual features. They lack the long and narrow forewings and the very short hindwings. In addition, the media vein on the forewing has more than 6 branches. These characters are found among genera in the tribe Derbini, to where Zeugma was assigned before the 1950s. The genus was transferred to the Zoraidini by Fennah, mainly based on the venation of the forewings, specifically that of the cubitus and the clavus. Further, when at rest, the live insects do not raise their wings above the body like in most other species of the tribe Zoraidini, but hold them in a roof-like position. Because of these atypical features, the genus Zeugma is placed in a separate subtribe. The colouration of the body is typically straw-coloured to light brown with some parts dark brown, reddish, black or sometimes yellowish. The forewings are translucent, often with brown stripes, especially on or along the veins.

Type species: Zeugma vittata Westwood, 1840

== Distribution ==
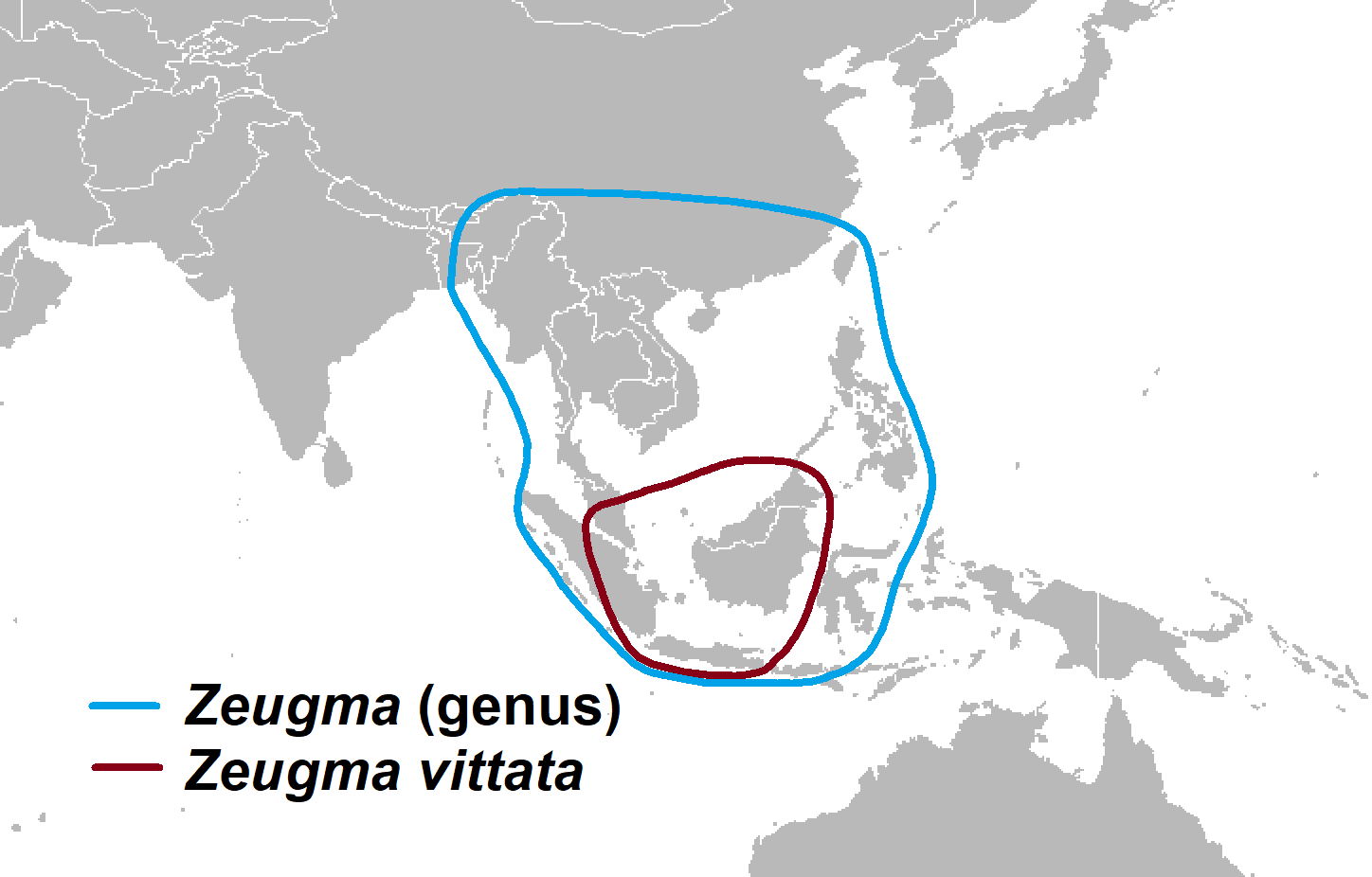
Distribution ranges of the species in the genus Zeugma (blue outline) and that of Zeugma vittata, the type species (brown outline)

Species of the genus Zeugma are found in central and western parts of Indonesia, in Malaysia, Thailand, Cambodia, the Philippines, Taiwan and in Assam (India). The description of the type species of Zeugma, Zeugma vittata, was based on a specimen of unknown origin. In 1913, Muir described Zeugma monticola which he later regarded as a synonym name for Zeugma vittata, giving Parit Buntar (peninsular Malaysia), Mowong (Borneo) and Pekalongan (Central Java) as localities. Four other species of Zeugma have been described by Muir from Indonesia, Zeugma elegans and Zeugma karnyi from the Mentawai Islands, off West Sumatra, Zeugma corporaali from Medan in northern Sumatra, and Zeugma javana from Java. In addition, Zeugma fuscinervis has been described from Assam (India), Zeugma valdezi from the Philippines, as well as two species from Taiwan (Zeugma maesta and Zeugma makii). Several unidentified species of Zeugma have been reported from southern Thailand, southern Cambodia and from Sulawesi Island in Indonesia.

== Description ==
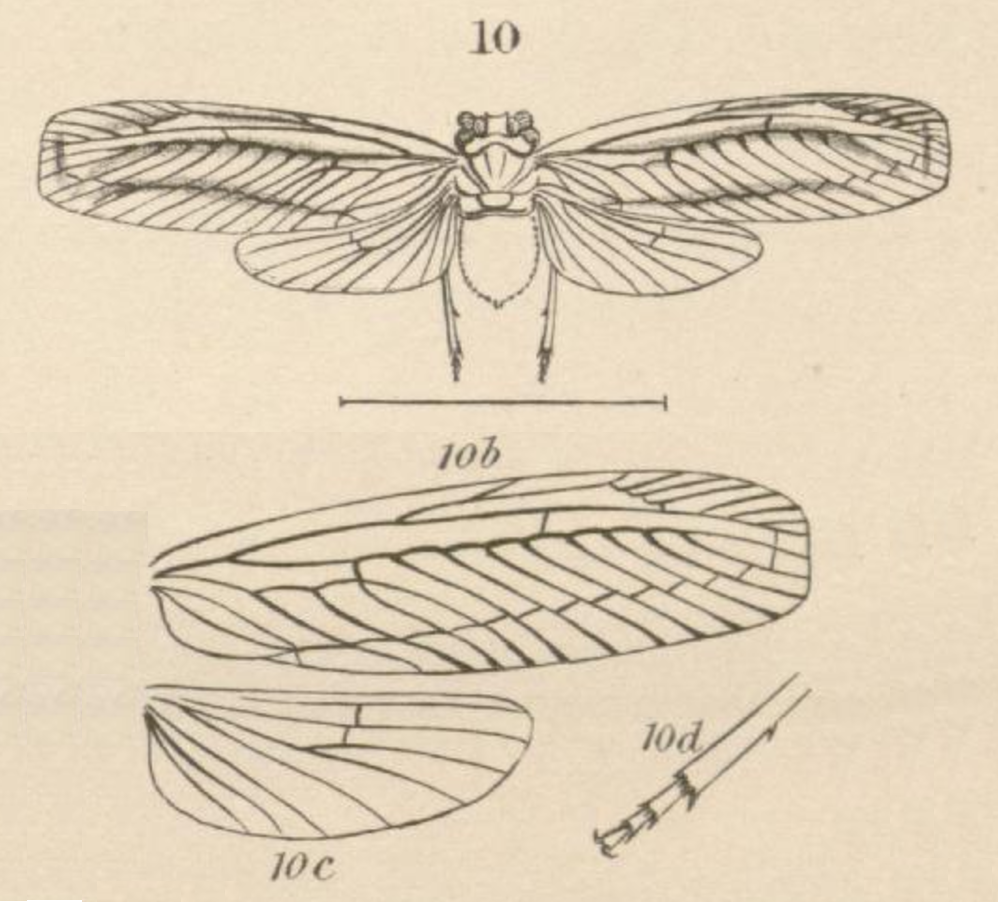
Drawing by J.O. Westwood of the type species, Zeugma vittata. Top: whole insect with wings spread out, lower part: venation of fore- and hindwings in more detail and end of hind tibia and tarsus

Typically, species in the tribe Zoraidini have forewings which are at least 3½ times longer than wide, hind wings which are less than half as long as the forewings and a media vein on the forewings which has 5 or 6 branches. In the genus Zeugma the above features do not apply. The forewings are broader, only about 2½ times longer than wide, the hind wings are longer than half the forewing length, usually around 60% of the forewing length, and the media vein on the forewing has 8 or more branches, usually with none of them branching further into sub branches. Such features are found in the tribe Derbini and Zeugma has been placed into that tribe before the 1950s. However, Zeugma was transferred to the tribe Zoraidini by Fennah after redefining the tribe Zoraidini. This transfer was mainly based on the venation of the forewings, specifically that of the clavus and the cubitus, as well as on the venation of the hind wings. Like in other genera of Zoraidini, the forewings of Zeugma have an open clavus where the two veins of the clavus join, but the combined vein does not reach the hind margin, instead it meets the veins of the cubitus.

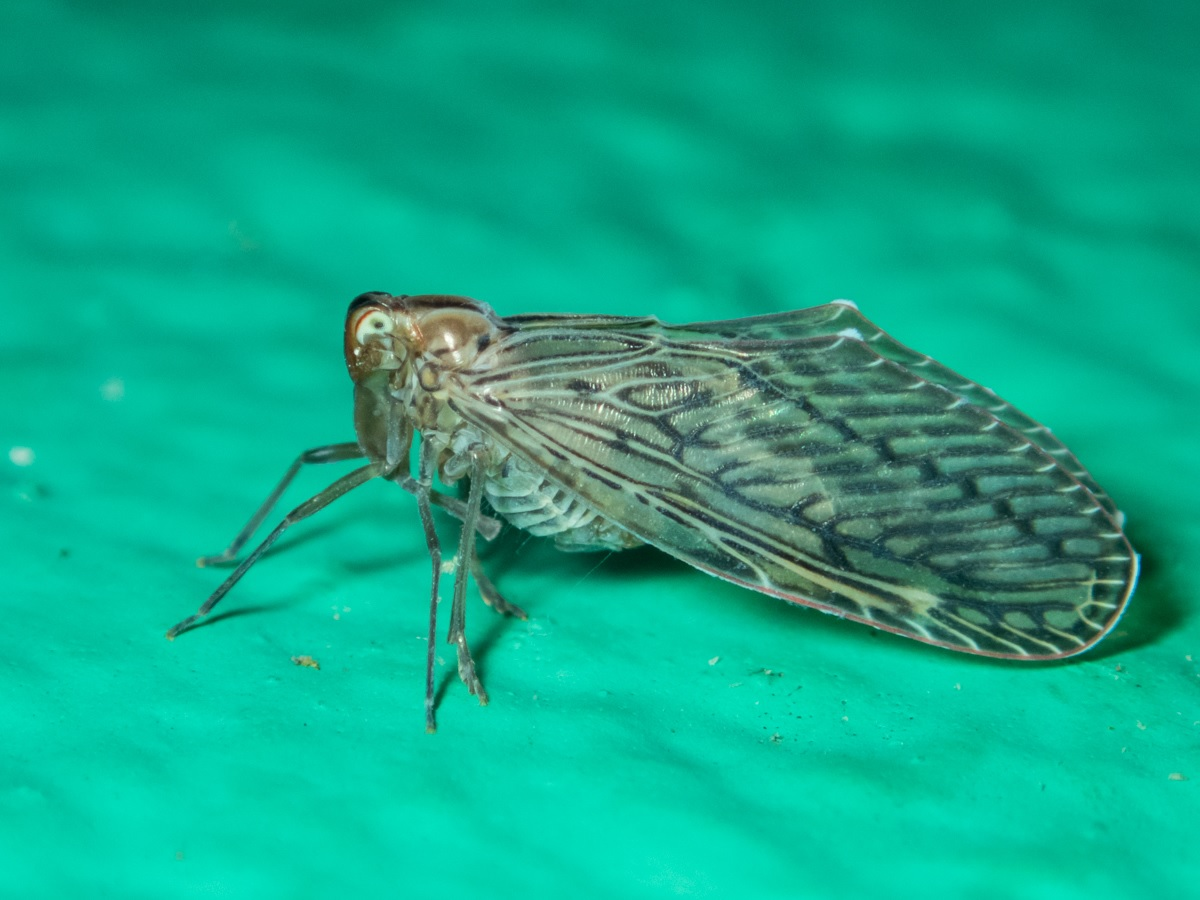
Species of Zeugma from Cambodia

When live Zeugma species are at rest, they carry their wings in a roof-like position covering their abdomen. This is also in contrast to most other species of the tribe Zoraidini which raise their wings above the body. Both wing positions are not found in species of the tribe Derbini, which spread out their wings laterally when at rest, holding them parallel to the surface they sit on. Due to the various differences to other genera in the tribe Zoraidini, the genus Zeugma has been placed in a separate subtribe, the Zeugmatina.

Within the tribe Zoraidini, the species of Zeugma are of medium size, the body is around 5 mm long from the tip of the head to the end of the abdomen. The forewings are usually around 9 mm long. Zeugma elegans appears to be the largest species with a body length of 6 mm and a forewing length of 13 mm. The head is broad, as broad as the thorax, another unusual feature in the tribe Zoraidini. The dorsal part of the head between the eyes (the vertex) and the face are also broad. The antennae are elongated, but shorter than the face. The typical colour of Zeugma species is light brown or stramineous (straw-coloured), often with dark brown marks or bands. For example, the forewings or the mesonotum might have dark brown bands. The forewing veins are also often dark brown or are lined with dark brown stripes. Further, the body and legs can have additional marks which may be black, red or yellowish.

== Biology ==
There is no information on the biology of the immature stages of Zeugma species. However, it can be assumed that they live in decaying organic matter like other derbids, feeding on fungi. Although there are few host plant records for the adult hoppers in the genus Zeugma, the species seem to feed mainly on palm trees and other monocots like other species in the tribe Zoraidini. For example, Zeugma javana was described from specimens collected from palm trees in Java and Zeugma valdezi has been frequently recorded as feeding on coconut palms in the Philippines.

== Species ==
The following list summarizes the distribution and colouration of the 9 species of Zeugma:

Zeugma corporaali Muir, 1923
Indonesia, Sumatra, Medan. Similar in size and colouration to Zeugma vittata.

Zeugma elegans Muir, 1926
Described from Indonesia, Mentawai Islands (Se Pora, off West Sumatra), also reported from Singapore and mainland Malaysia. Body light brown, a dark brown mark down the frons and clypeus, a broad dark mark down middle of mesonotum; abdomen dark brown, forewings light brown with dark veins.

Zeugma fuscinervis Muir, 1922
In Assam (India). Head and pronotum light brown, darker over vertex and down the middle of pronotum; mesonotum and tegulae dark brown or black; abdomen dark brown; legs light brown; forewings translucent, slightly yellowish, veins dark spreading into membrane.

Zeugma javana Muir, 1915
In Java, Indonesia. Body straw-coloured or light brown; dark brown or black between the keels of the vertex, the face and the clypeus; forewings straw-coloured, veins yellow with brown borders.

Zeugma karnyi Muir, 1926
In Indonesia, Mentawai Islands, off West Sumatra. Body straw-coloured, some parts red, clypeus black, middle of pronotum and mesonotum dark brown; forewings translucent and straw-coloured, veins yellow or reddish.

Zeugma maesta Yang & Wu, 1993
In Taiwan. General colour pale yellow; red in a rather broad band on pro- and mesonotum, on the vertex and on the ridges of face and postclypeus, also on the upper portion of the tegula; forewings pale yellow with black spots and lines.

Zeugma makii Muir, 1914
In Taiwan. Body straw-coloured, vertex, face, clypeus, middle of pronotum and scutellum red; front legs brown; forewings translucent, pale dirty yellow with lighter veins, media vein and bases of median branches as well as cross-veins brown.

Zeugma valdezi Muir, 1917
In the Philippines. Body brown or reddish brown, a dark longitudinal mark passing over vertex face and clypeus, five dark marks on mesonotum, abdomen darker; forewings very light brown or reddish yellow, darker along veins, veins reddish brown.

Zeugma vittata Westwood, 1840 TYPE SPECIES
Synonym: Zeugma monticola Muir 1913
In peninsular Malaysia, Singapore, Borneo, Java and Bali. Head, pronotum, sterna and legs orange-yellow, some parts blackish or brown; forewings translucent, tinted with grey, a brown line covering cross veins of cubitus and media branches, another over the media vein and a third through the subcostal cell to the wing tip, a black line over apical cross veins.
