= Paraperipatus papuensis =

Scientific classification
- Kingdom: Animalia
- Phylum: Onychophora
- Family: Peripatopsidae
- Genus: Paraperipatus
- Species: P. papuensis

Binomial name
- Paraperipatus papuensis (Sedgwick, 1910)

Synonyms
- Peripatus papuensis Sedgwick, 1910

Species of basal Peripatopsid velvet worm

Paraperipatus papuensis is a species of velvet worm in the Peripatopsidae family. This species is a pale greenish blue. Females of this species may have as few as 21 pairs of legs or as many as 29 pairs, exhibiting the greatest intraspecific variation in leg number found in any peripatopsid species. Males of this species range from 21 to 27 leg pairs. The maximum number of leg pairs recorded in this species (29) is also the maximum number of leg pairs found in the family Peripatopsidae. Females range from 22 mm to 83 mm in length, whereas males range from 19 mm to 45 mm. The type locality is in Western New Guinea, Indonesia.
