= John Kershaw (entomologist) =

British explorer, naturalist and entomologist

John Crampton Wilkinson Kershaw (1871 – 26 August 1959) was a British explorer, naturalist and entomologist who explored and collected in South China and Australia. He was among the first entomologists to successfully rear tachinid parasitoids in quantity for use in biological control.

Kershaw was born in Boughton, Nottinghamshire, where his father George was a vicar. Like two of his brothers, Bertram and Sidney, he took an interest in entomology from a young age. He was influenced by David Sharp and Edward Poulton. In 1898 he went to Hong Kong and there he met amateur ornithologist Frederick William Styan and became interested in the birds of the Macao region. He helped Frederick A. G. Muir of the Hawaiian Sugar Planters' Association in entomological studies between 1906 and 1907 to locate parasites of sugarcane pests. In 1906 Kershaw published a book on the Butterflies of Hong Kong. Kershaw continued to work with the sugarcane planters' association and travelled to northern Australia in 1910 and helped in breeding the tachinid fly, Lixophaga sphenophori, at the Mossman sugar mill to control the sugarcane weevil Rhabdoscelus obscurus. He worked for a while Trinidad in 1912 before returning to England after World War I (1918). Kershaw was a skilled microscopist, specimen preparer and illustrator who drew and painted plates in his publications such as the description of a new species of velvet worm, Paraperipatus ceramensis, and the anatomy of Pyrops candelaria.
