= Zeugma (literary journal) =

Canadian literary journal

Zeugma is a literary journal published in St. John's, Newfoundland and Labrador, Canada. First published in February 2006 by Meghan Beresford and Tomasz Mrozewski, Zeugma has grown to publish 400 copies per quarter, and includes primarily Canadian content, with a number of international items. It has ISSN 1718-5475.

== Content ==
Zeugma publishes original creative writing in all genres, in the form of fiction, poetry and non-fiction. Special emphasis is given to works by new authors. The journal has published local, national and international authors.

The journal publishes:

- Original Fiction, Poetry, and Erotica
- Non-fiction, Personal Essays
- Reviews of the Printed and Electronic Word
- Comics, Line Drawings and Photography

== Production ==
Zeugma's covers to date have been designed by Jedediah Baker, and silk-screened by local (St. John's) independent printers and designers Ben Jackson and Lesley Thompson. The editions have been sewn-bound. The content of both issues has been photocopied. All issues are hand-numbered.

== Funding ==
The journal was awarded a project grant by the Newfoundland and Labrador Arts Council in May 2006 to pay an honorarium to contributing artists for the second and third issues. Zeugma does not sell advertising. It is produced primarily through volunteer labour and in-kind donations, with other costs covered by the sale of copies.
