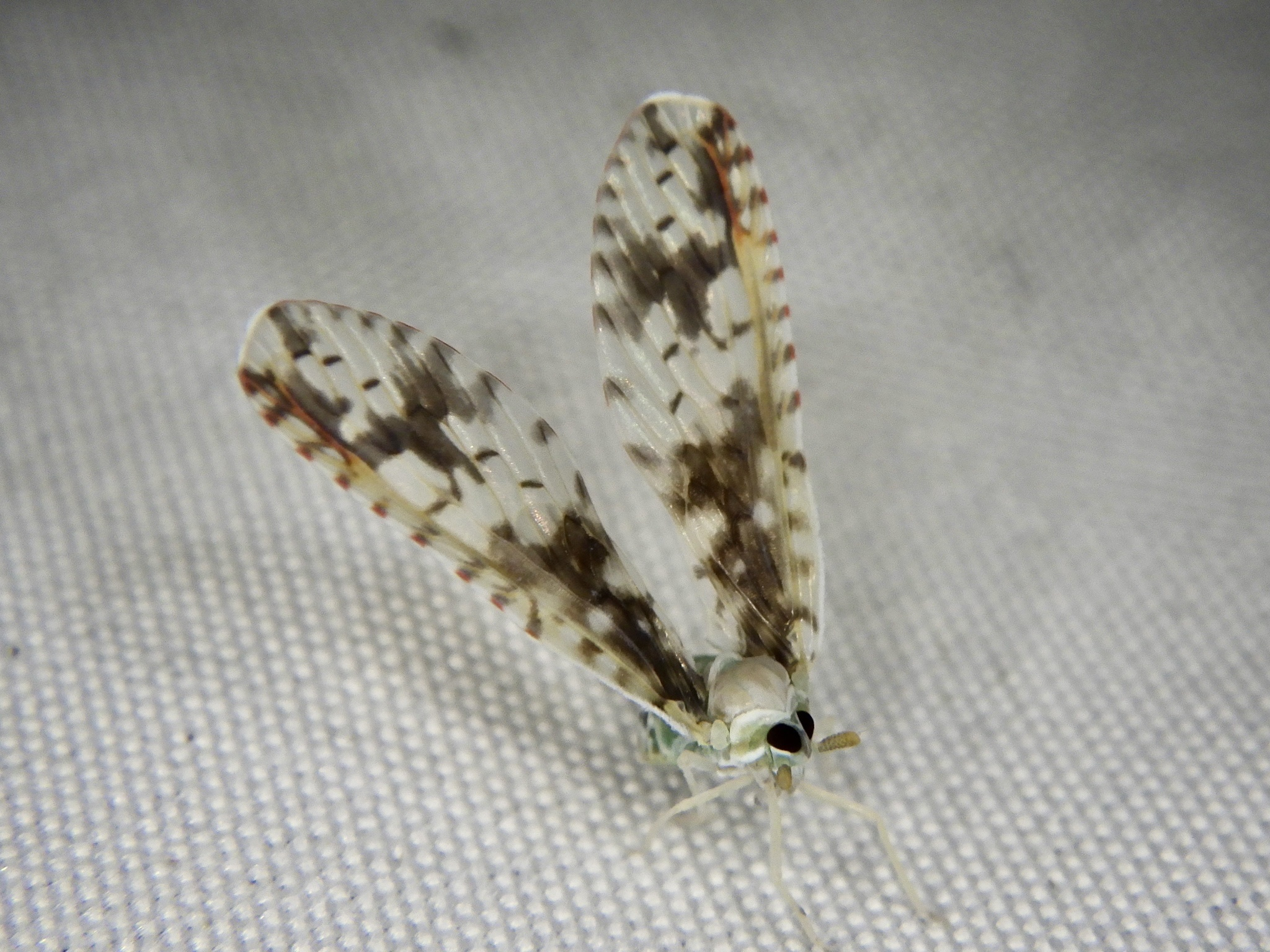
- Pamendanga matsumurae

Scientific classification
- Kingdom: Animalia
- Phylum: Arthropoda
- Class: Insecta
- Order: Hemiptera
- Suborder: Auchenorrhyncha
- Infraorder: Fulgoromorpha
- Family: Derbidae
- Subfamily: Otiocerinae
- Tribe: Zoraidini
- Genus: Pamendanga; Distant, 1906

Synonyms
- Paraproutista Muir, 1913

= Pamendanga =

Genus of planthoppers

Pamendanga is a genus of planthoppers from the family Derbidae, tribe Zoraidini, with 37 species, as of 2024. About two-thirds of the species, including the type species, are found in tropical and some subtropical parts of Asia, from Sri Lanka in the West to parts of Japan in the North-East and including the Philippines, Indonesia and New Guinea. The remaining species have been described from Africa, mainly from the humid tropics of West Africa, ranging from Sierra Leone and the Ivory Coast in the North to the Democratic Republic of Congo in the South. Some species are also known from eastern Africa (Uganda and Mozambique). Like other species of the tribe Zoraidini, Pamendanga species have long and narrow forewings and short hind wings. They can be recognized by the forewing venation and the shape of the head and the antennae. On the forewing, the media vein has 6 branches and the 3rd branch forks further into 2 sub branches. The head has a flat profile and a narrow face with cylindrical antennae which are elongated but not longer than the face.

Type species: Pamendanga rubilinea Distant, 1906

== Distribution ==
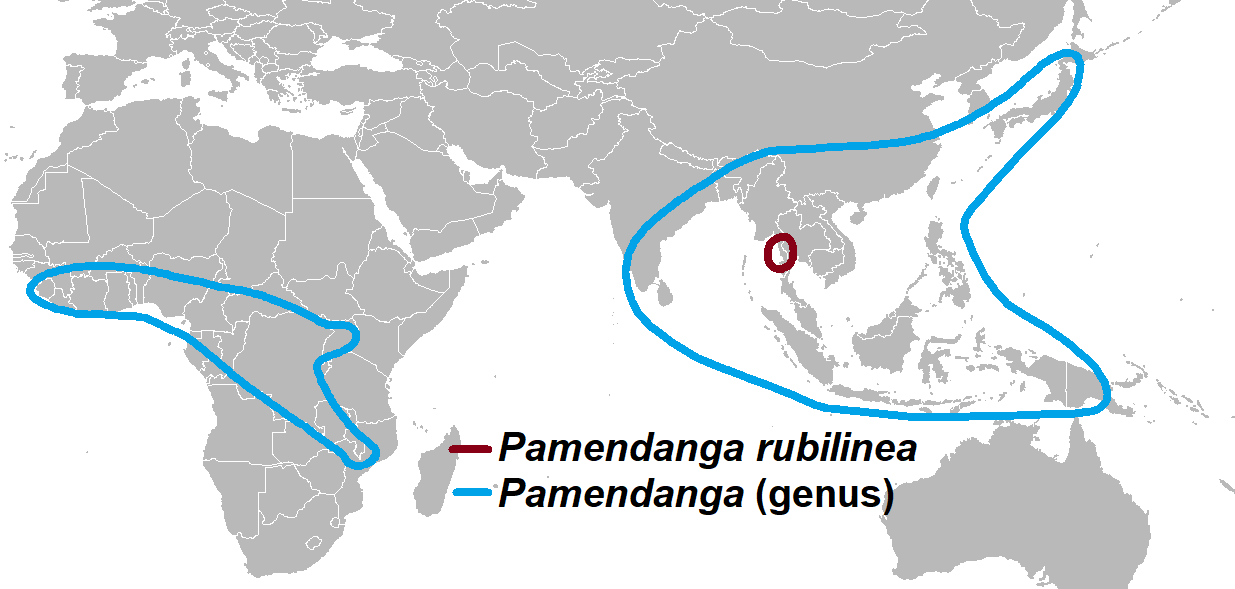
Distribution ranges of the species in the genus Pamendanga (blue outline) and that of Pamendanga rubilinea, the type species (brown outline)

The type species, Pamendanga rubilinea, has only been reported from Myitta, Tenasserim region, in southern Myanmar. There are 24 other species in tropical and some subtropical parts of Asia. These range from the southern tip of India and Sri Lanka in the West to parts of Japan in the northeast, and includes most parts of Indonesia, the Philippines and New Guinea in the southeast. In Africa, 12 species have been described, mainly from the humid tropics of western Africa, ranging from Sierra Leone, Ghana and the Ivory Coast in the North to the Democratic Republic of Congo in the South. Two species are also found in eastern Africa, namely in Uganda (Pamendanga calami) and in Mozambique (Pamendanga majuscula).

Most species of Pamendanga have been only reported from their type locality. However, several species are more widely distributed like Pamendanga ceramensis (Indonesia, New Guinea) and Pamendanga matsumurae (Japan, Korea, Taiwan) in eastern Asia. In Africa, Pamendanga calami (Sierra Leone, Ghana, Nigeria, Uganda, Central African Republic, Democratic Republic of Congo) and Pamendanga nealei (Ghana, Nigeria, Central African Republic, Democratic Republic of Congo) have a wider distribution.

== Description ==
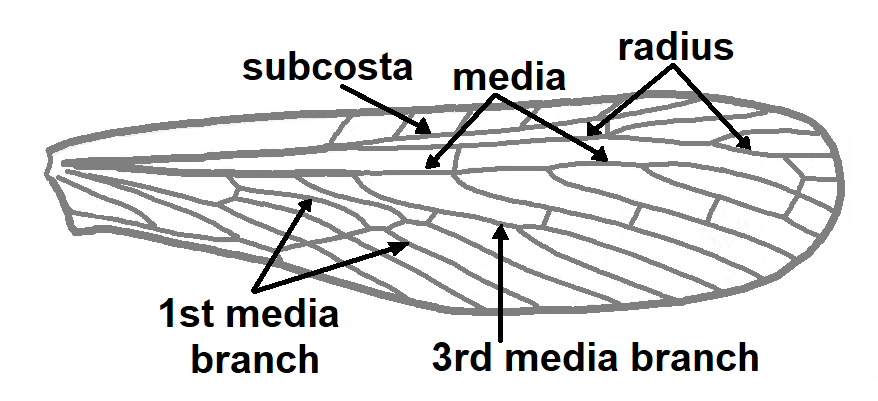
Forewing venation of Pamendanga calami

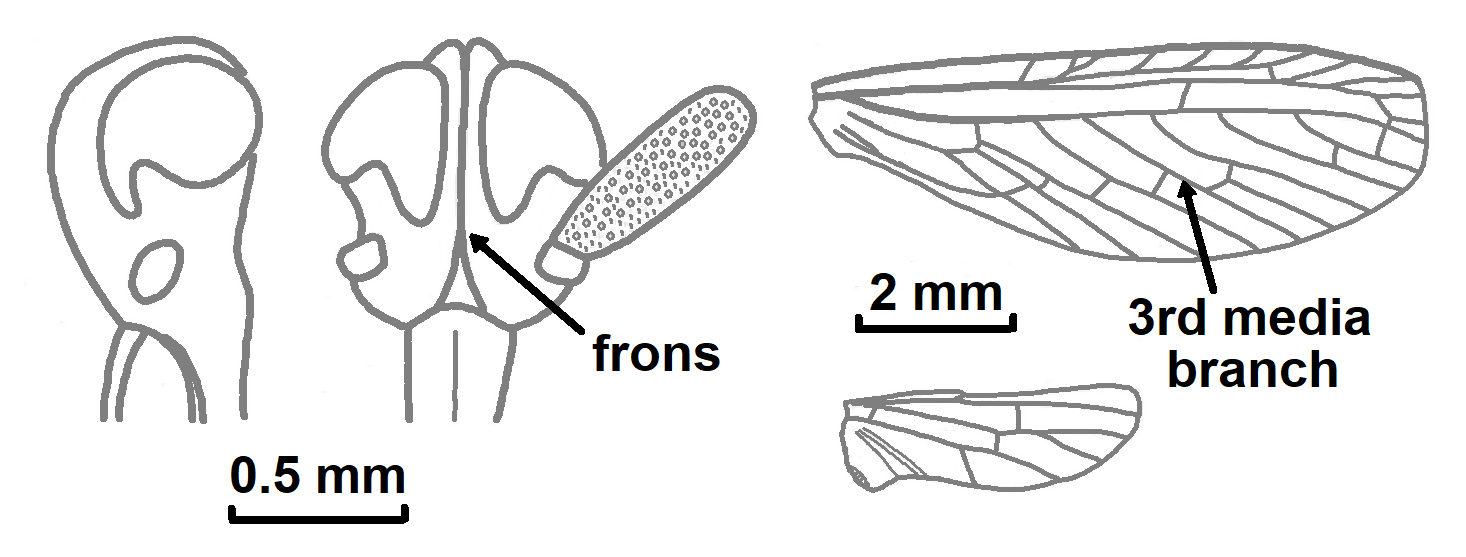
Pamendanga matsumurae: Left, head in profile and frontal view. Right: venation of forewing (top) and hind wing (bottom)

Pamendanga species can be recognized by a combination of different characters in the forewing venation as well as the shape of the head and the antennae. On the forewing, the media vein has 6 branches of which the 3rd branch forks further into two sub branches. The radius has 3 branches near its tip. The head has a narrow face (frons) with the ridges on the sides meeting in front of the eyes. The profile of the head is flat and the ridges on the side of the face are short. The antennae are elongated and cylindrical, but not longer than the face.

Within the tribe Zoraidini, the species of Pamendanga are of medium size and like in other genera of this tribe have long and narrow forewings and short hind wings. The body is about 3 to 4 mm long from the head to the tip of the abdomen and the forewings are typically around 9 or 10 mm long, with males being about 15 to 20% smaller than females. The forewings are about 3 to 4 times longer than wide and the length of the hindwings is around 40% that of the forewings.

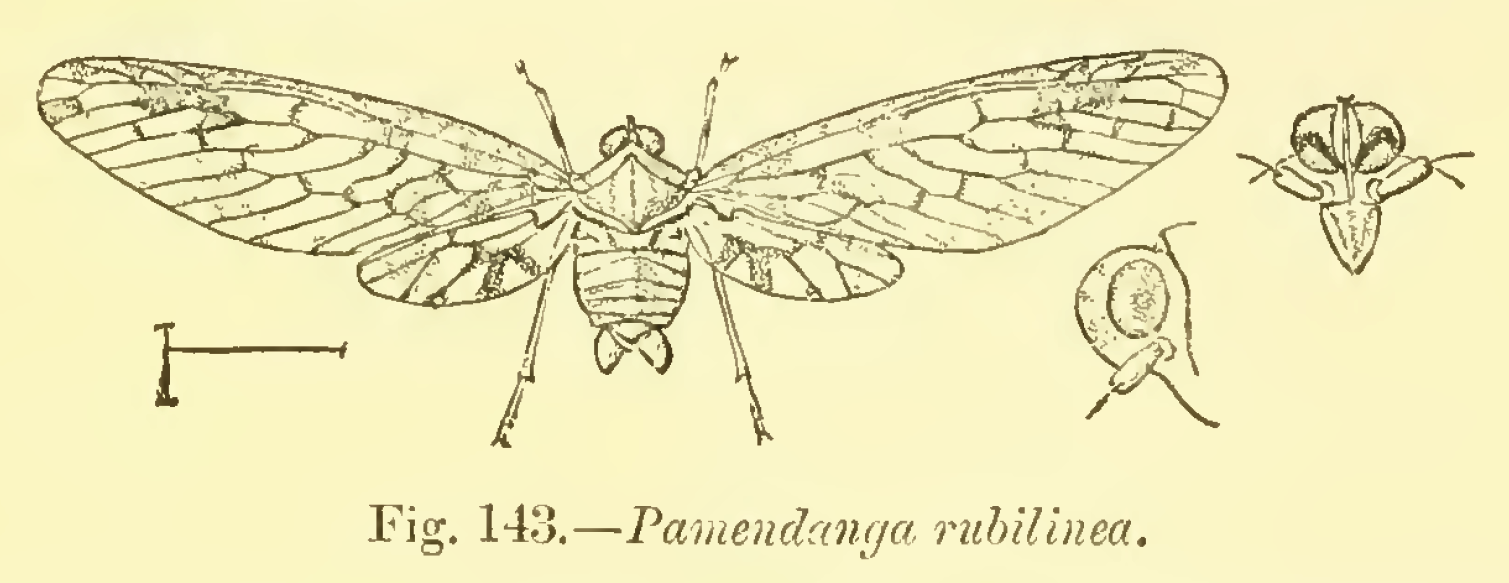
Original drawing by W.L. Distant of Pamendanga rubilinea, the type species of the genus Pamendanga (click on image to enlarge it)

The body of Pamendanga species is typically straw-coloured to brownish yellow or ochrous. The forewings often have a checkered pattern of dark brown to black patches, see for example the wing pattern of Pamendanga matsumurae at the top right of this page. In other species, a lighter or darker colour pattern may dominate on the forewings and the wings of Pamendanga nigra are nearly all black. However, in almost all species, the costal cells show a series of light patches on a dark background or a series of dark patches on a light background. Some species also have red marks, e.g. on the head or the forewings. The abdomen or some forewing veins may be completely red, and in Pamendanga rubicunda most parts of the body are red.

== Biology ==
There is no information on the biology of immature Pamendanga species. However, it can be assumed that they live in decaying organic matter like other derbids, feeding on fungi. Host plant records of adults are rare, but Pamendanga species have been collected from coconut palms in Africa. In southern parts of Luzon Island (Philippines, Asia), Pamendanga fuscipennis was one of the most common insects found on young coconut palms.

== Taxonomy and species ==
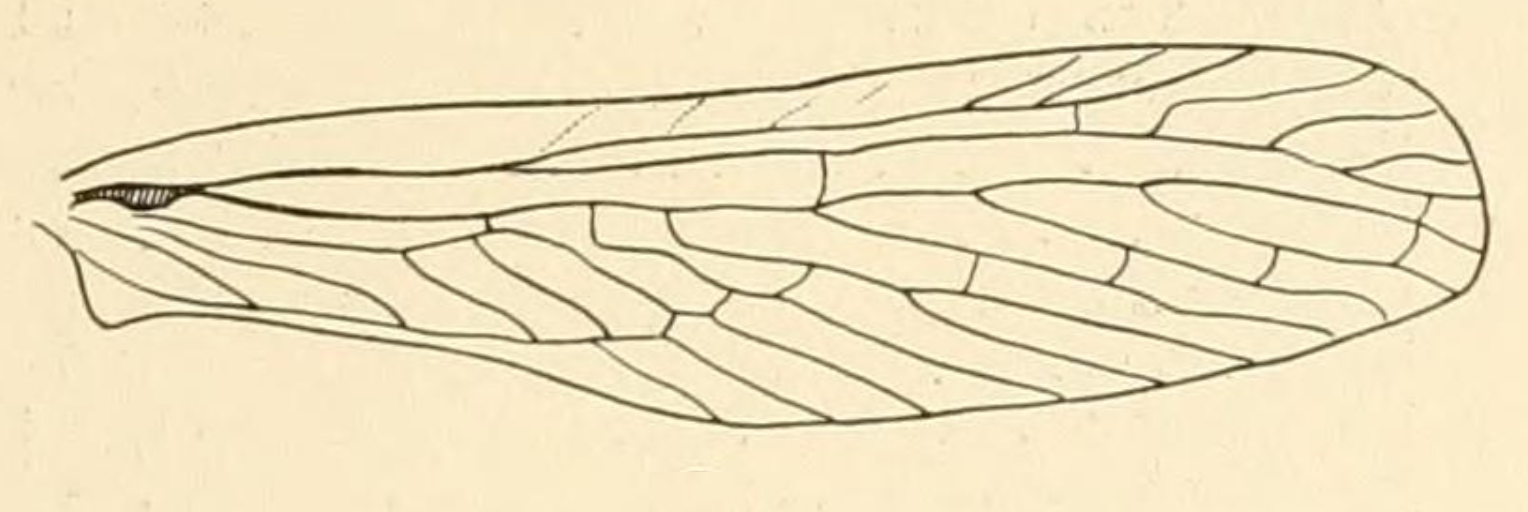
Original drawing by F. Muir of Paraproutista ceramensis (synonym of Pamendanga ceramensis), the type species of the genus Paraproutista

In 1913, Muir described the genus Paraproutista from 5 species found in Indonesia and Malaysia, with the type species Paraproutista ceramensis. However, he later regarded Paraproutista to be a synonym of Pamendanga.

The following 2 genera have the same forewing venation as the genus Pamendanga and can be distinguished mainly by the size of their antennae:

- Neoproutista Yang and Wu 1993 with the type species Paraproutista pseudoalbicosta Muir 1915 has very short antennae.
- Parapamendanga Yang and Wu 1993 with the type species Paraproutista sauterii Muir 1915 has long antennae, longer than the face.

As of 2004, 37 species of Pamendanga have been described. The most common species are:

- Pamendanga bispinosa Van Stalle, 1983
- Pamendanga calami (Melichar, 1912)
- Pamendanga ceramensis (Muir, 1913)
- Pamendanga fuscipennis (Muir, 1917)
- Pamendanga hancocki Muir, 1928
- Pamendanga hopkinsi Muir, 1934
- Pamendanga laestrygon Fennah, 1958
- Pamendanga matsumurae (Muir, 1918)
- Pamendanga nealei (Distant, 1914)
- Pamendanga obliterata Van Stalle, 1983
