= Frederick Arthur Godfrey Muir =

English entomologist

Frederick Arthur Godfrey Muir (24 April 1873 – 13 May 1931) was an English entomologist who worked in Africa and Hawaii. He wrote extensively describing many new species of insect and establishing the family Kinnaridae. He was also a pioneer of biological control.

== Biography ==
Muir was born in Clapham, London to Joseph Alexander and Annie Marie (Lempriere) Muir. He studied in private schools and worked for ten years in Africa with the Eastern Telegraph Company from 1886 to 1905. He took an interest in insects and was encouraged by David Sharp and joined the experimental station of the Hawaiian Sugar Planters' Association at Honolulu in 1905 and worked extensively on insects, especially those that suck sap in the superfamily Fulgoroidea. He initially worked under Robert Cyril Layton Perkins where he continued the work of Albert Koebele on the destructive Perkinsiella saccharicida. Work included travel to Southeast Asia to seek parasites to control the pests of cane in Hawaii. In 1913 he visited Japan to seek parasites for the root grub Anomala orientalis which was causing great damage to sugar cane. He published extensively, with over 100 scientific papers and was a Fellow of the Entomological Society of London. He was an authority on the leaf-hopper family Delphacidae. Muir conducted pioneering experiments on biological control, mass-rearing along with J.C. Kershaw, and introducing, the tachinid fly Ceromasia sphenophori into Hawaii.

He married Margaret Annie Sharp (daughter of David Sharp) in April 1918 and they had a son.
