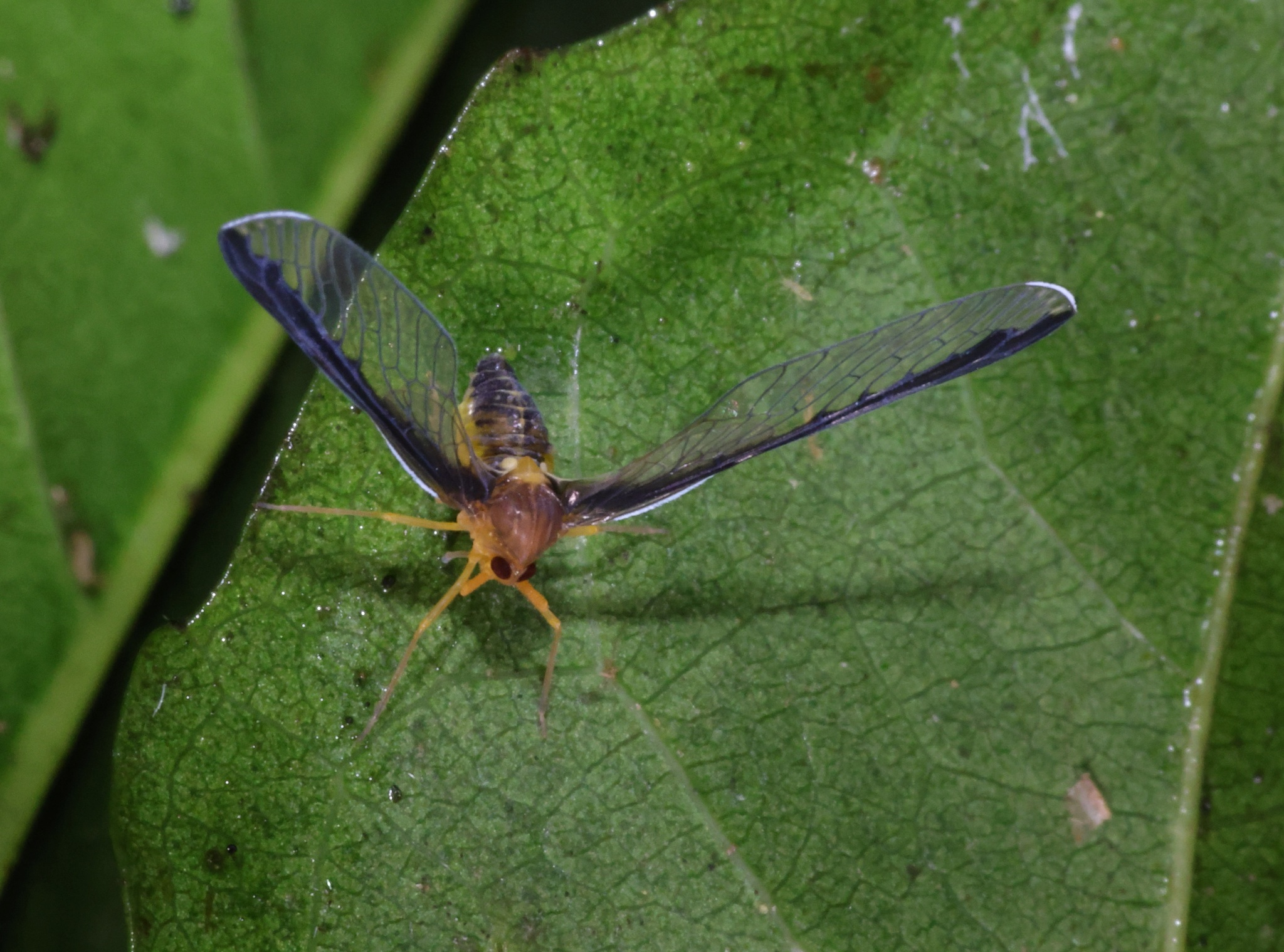
- Zoraida pterophoroides

Scientific classification
- Domain: Eukaryota
- Kingdom: Animalia
- Phylum: Arthropoda
- Class: Insecta
- Order: Hemiptera
- Suborder: Auchenorrhyncha
- Infraorder: Fulgoromorpha
- Family: Derbidae
- Subfamily: Otiocerinae
- Tribe: Zoraidini
- Genus: Zoraida; Kirkaldy 1900

Type species
- Derbe sinuosa Boheman, 1838

Synonyms
- Thracia Westwood, 1840

= Zoraida (planthopper) =

Genus of planthoppers

Zoraida is a large genus of planthoppers from the family Derbidae, tribe Zoraidini, with more than 100 species. These are widely distributed in the Old World tropics and in some subtropical parts of eastern Asia. In Africa, they are found mainly in the humid tropics of West Africa like Sierra Leone, the Ivory Coast, the Central African Republic, Nigeria or the Democratic Republic of Congo. However, Zoraida species have been also described from eastern Africa as far north as South Sudan and as far south as parts of South Africa. In Asia, the largest number of species have been described/reported from Indonesia, the Philippines, Taiwan and Sri Lanka, but species are also known as far south as northern Australia and as far north as the southern tip of far-eastern Russia. Like other species of the tribe Zoraidini, Zoraida species have long and narrow forewings and short hind wings. They can be identifies by the forewing venation and the structure of the head.

== Distribution ==
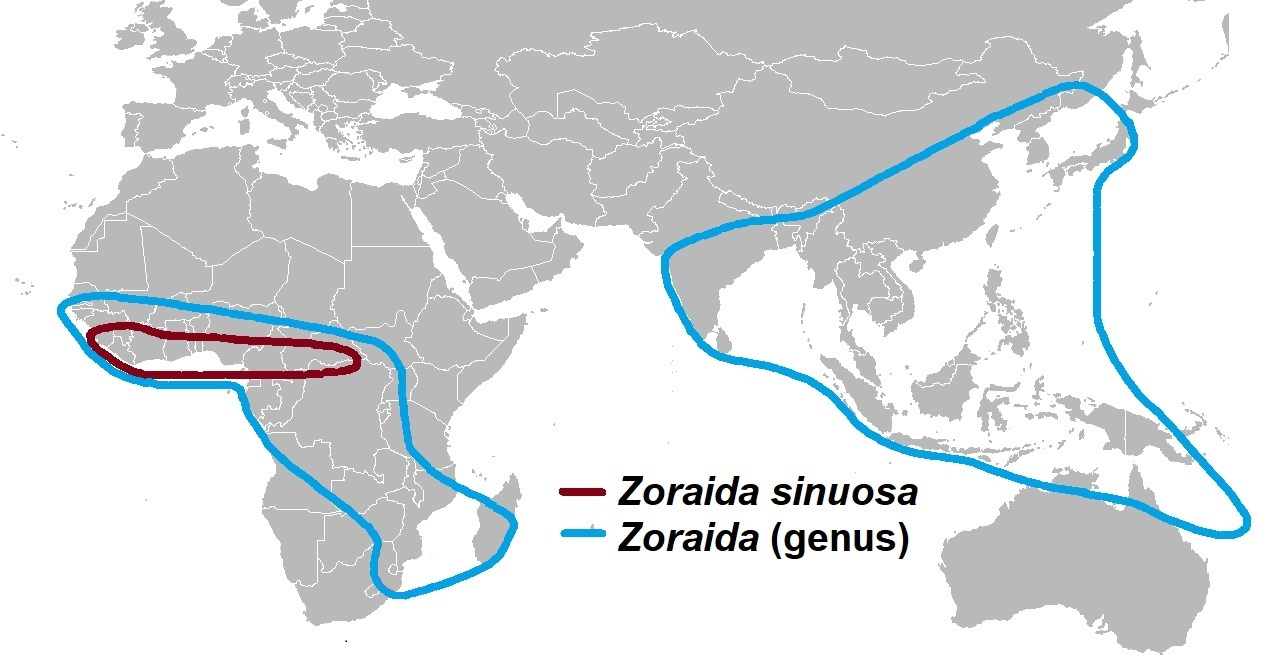
Distribution ranges of the species in the genus Zoraida (blue outline) and that of Zoraida sinuosa, the type species (brown outline)

About one third of the described Zoraida species are found in Africa and around two thirds in Asia. In Africa, Zoraida species are most common in the humid tropics of West Africa from Sierra Leone, the Ivory Coast, Ghana, Nigeria and the Central African Republic in the North, down to the Democratic Republic of Congo in the South. However, some species have been recorded further north (Senegal and Burkina Faso) and also further south (Angola). Zoraida species are also found in tropical parts of eastern Africa from South Sudan in the North, over Uganda, Malawi, Mozambique to parts of South Africa in the South, including Madagascar.

In Asia, Zoraida species have a wide distribution from Sri Lanka and most parts of India in the West, over southern mainland Asia (Myanmar, Malaysia, parts of China) to far-eastern Asia including Korea and southern parts of far-eastern Russia. The distribution also includes many islands of eastern and south-eastern Asia and parts of the western Pacific like parts of Japan, Taiwan, Palau, the Philippines and Indonesia, with the largest number of species having been described from Indonesia, Taiwan and the Philippines. Further south, the distribution extends to the islands of New Guinea, New Caledonia and to parts of northern Australia.

The species of the subgenus Zoraida (Neozoraida) have been mainly described from Africa and Sri Lanka, while those from the subgenus Zoraida (Peggiopsis) predominantly from the Philippines and Indonesia. For details on the distribution of the individual species in the 3 subgenera of Zoraida see the Zoraida species list.

== Description ==
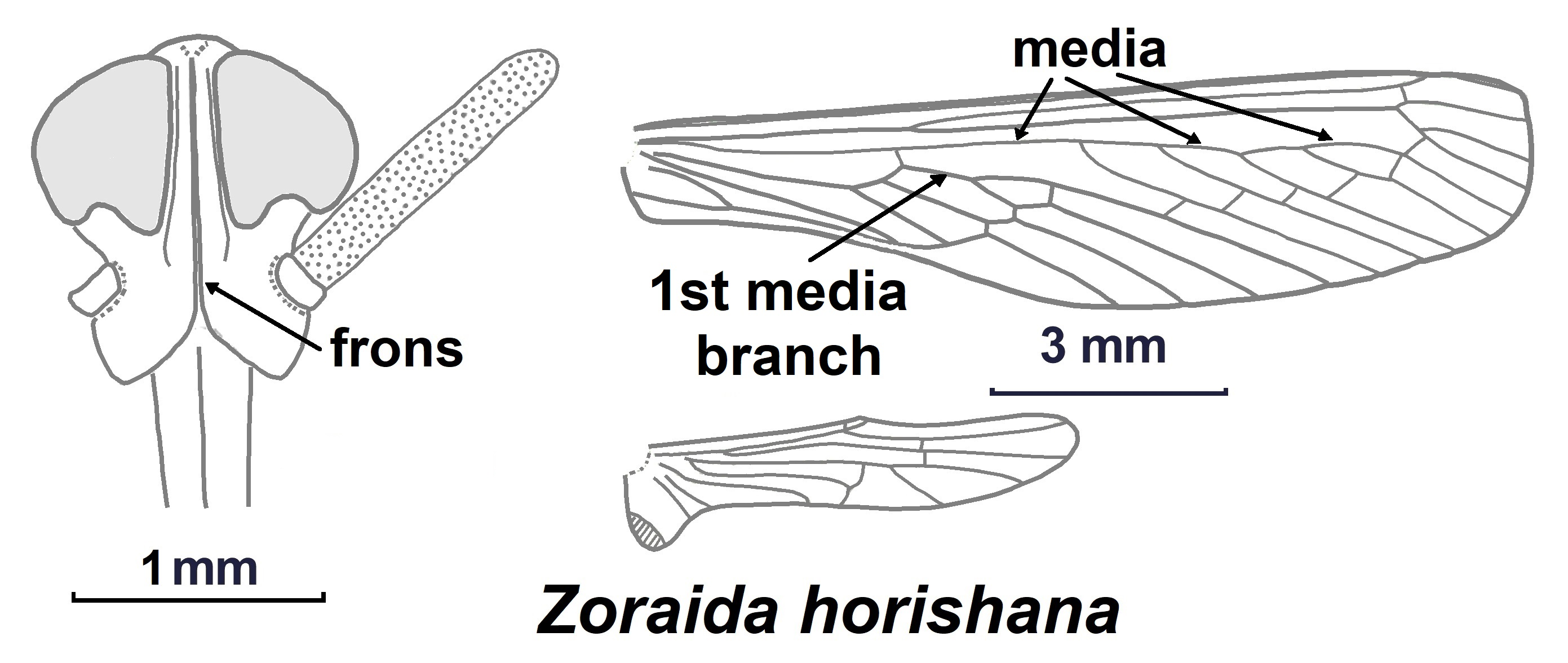
Zoraida horishana - Left: head in frontal view, Right: venation of forewing (top) and hind wing (bottom)

The species of Zoraida can be distinguished from other genera of the tribe Zoraidini by the venation and the shape of the forewings. The media vein has 5 branches with the first branch being forked. In a few species, the 2 sub branches of the first media branch fork again so that a total of 4 sub branches reach the wing margin. The base of the costal margin is not extended like in the genus Peggia and the hind margin is not undulate like in the genus Losbanosia.

The forewings are typically between 10 and 15 mm long and the body is usually not more than half that length. Like in other groups from the tribe Zoraidini, the species of Zoraida have long and narrow forewings and short hind wings. In the type species Zoraida sinuosa the length of the hind wings is around 40% that of the forewings and some species of Zoraida have been described with much shorter hind wings. Also, the face (frons) is narrow with the ridges on the side typically meeting most of its length. The antennae are long, usually longer than the face. In profile, the head is typically flat and evenly rounded. The forewings may have coloured areas or patterns like a broad dark stripe along the costal margin. The wings are spread out when the insects are at rest. The body is often straw-coloured.

== Biology ==
There is little information on the host plants and the biology of the species of Zoraida. The nymphs have been found in decaying tree trunks, where they presumably feed on fungi. Very few authors have reported from which plants the specimens were collected from. Some species seem to be common on coconut and other palms, where they are sometimes suspected to be disease vectors. In the Ivory Coast, Africa, two species have been collected from Macaranga hurifolia.

== Subgenera and species ==
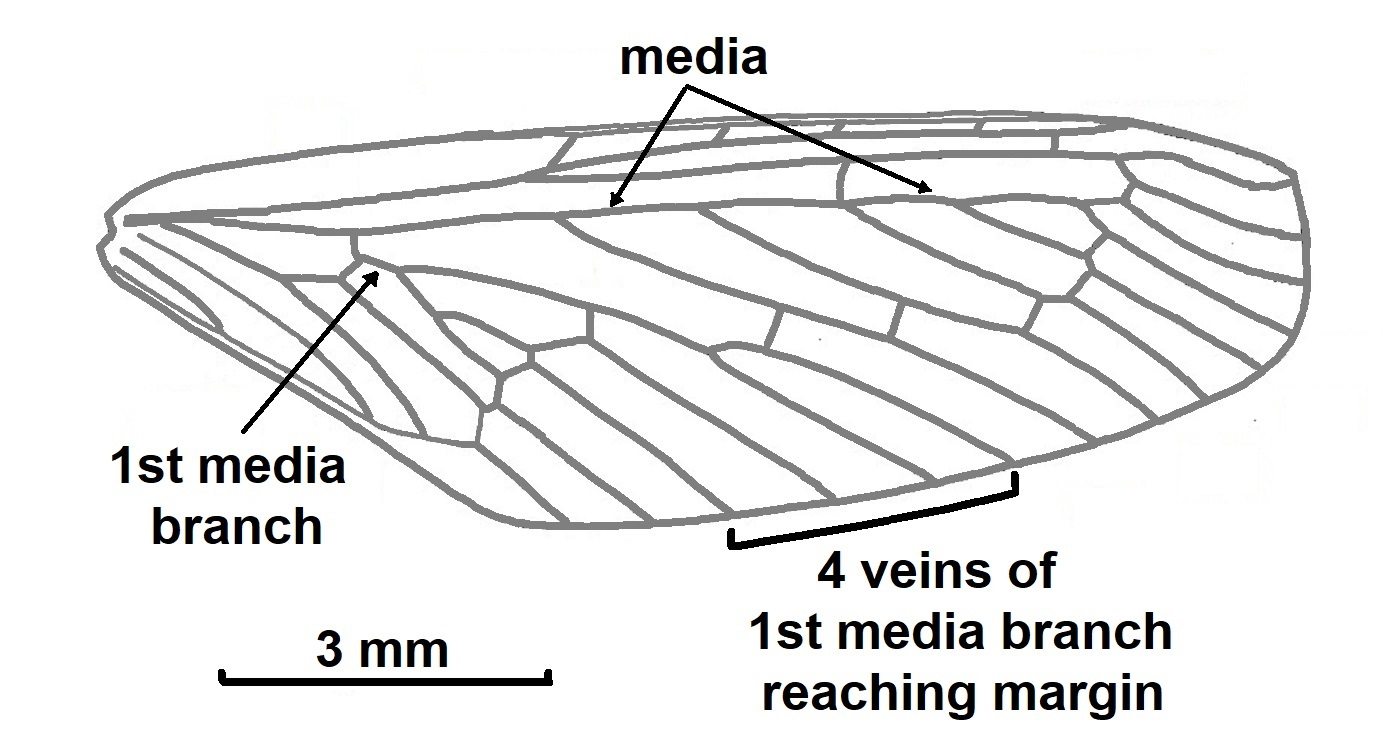
Forewing venation of Zoraida (Neozoraida) insignata showing sub branches of the first media branch

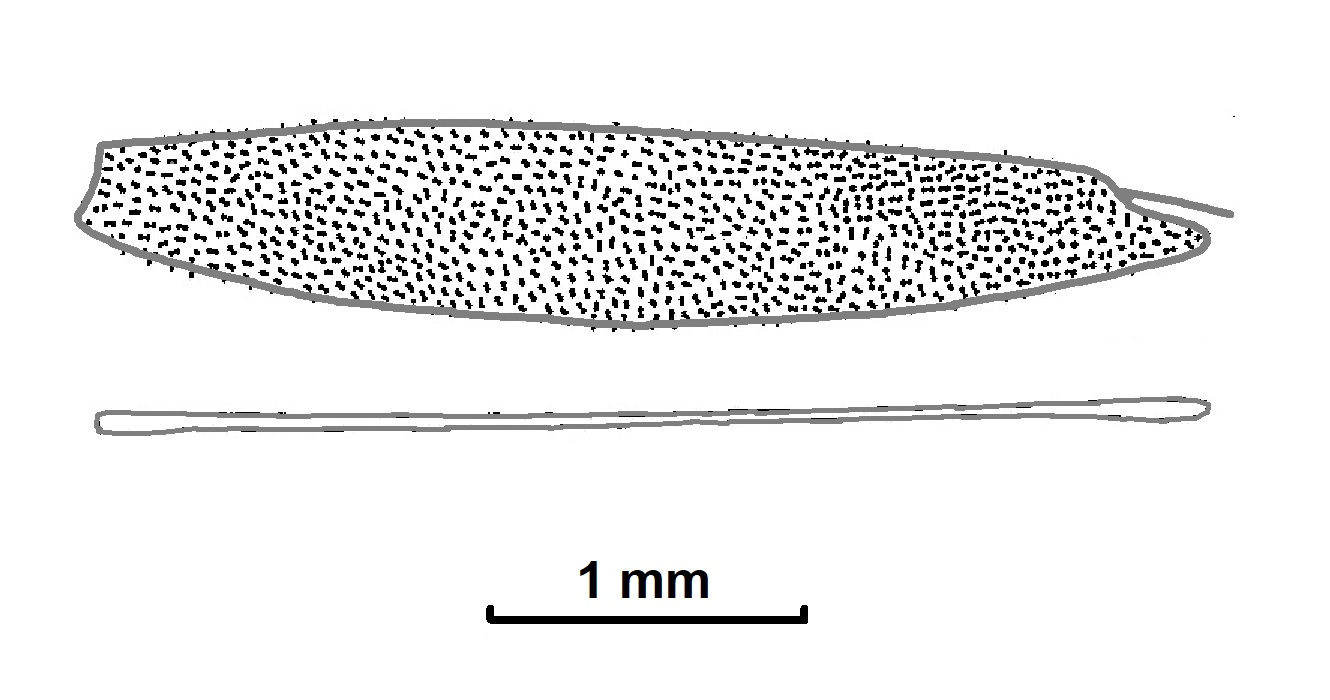
The broad and flat antenna of Zoraida (Peggiopsis) longa in frontal view (top) and in side view (bottom)

The genus Zoraida has been divided into 3 subgenera, Zoraida (Neozoraida), Zoraida (Peggiopsis) and Zoraida (Zoraida). However, more than one third of all species have not been formally assigned to one of these subgenera. This division into subgenera is based on the forewing venation and the shape of the antennae. In the subgenus Zoraida (Neozoraida), each of the 2 sub branches of the first media branch splits again, resulting in a total of 4 sub branches reaching the wing margin, in contrast to the other 2 subgenera, where the first media branch only branches once, with 2 sub branches reaching the wing margin. The antennae in the subgenus Zoraida (Peggiopsis) are very flat, while they are more cylindrical in the subgenus Zoraida (Zoraida). Around 120 species have been described in the three subgenera as of 2024.

== Taxonomy ==
While the Zoraida species of Africa have been reviewed by a number of authors, those of Asia have received less attention with the exception of the species found in Taiwan. Still, a number open taxonomic questions remain and the genus awaits further taxonomic work. Around 40% of the described Zoraida species have not yet been formally assigned to a subgenus. Further, the concept of the genus and its subgenera remains not well defined and includes a large range of different forms. Apart from the forms treated as different subgenera, there is for example also a large range in the length of the hind wings in the subgenus Zoraida (Zoraida). On one side, species have been described where the hind wings are about 50% of the forewing length and on the other side, the hind wings are less than 10% as long as the forewings in some species. Such a wide range is highly unusual for an insect genus in the family Derbidae.
