= List of Zoraida species =

Species of planthoppers

Zoraida is a large genus of planthoppers in the tribe Zoraidini of the family Derbidae. As of 2024, it comprises three subgenera and around 120 species. The species are found in tropical and some subtropical parts of Asia, Africa and parts of Australia and the western Pacific. This page provides for each subgenus an overview of the species, their distribution records and other details. "Wing length" means the length of the forewing which have been converted in some cases from measurements of expanded forewings (wingspan) according to the formula <half of wingspan minus 10%>, derived from published illustrations.

== Subgenus Neozoraida ==
Key
§ Type species
‡ Renamed

Species in subgenus Neozoraida
Species	Authority	Basionym	Range	Wing length (Note: Some wing length measurements converted from wingspan (half of wingspan minus 10%))	References
Zoraida carpenteri	Muir, 1928	n/a	Uganda, Nigeria	13.4 mm (0.53 in)	
‡Zoraida fletcheri	Distant, 1916	Zoraida variipennis Distant 1911	Sri Lanka	10 mm (0.39 in)	
Zoraida gilva	Distant, 1906	n/a	Sri Lanka	11 mm (0.43 in)	
Zoraida insignata	Yang & Wu, 1993	n/a	Taiwan	11.0 mm (0.43 in)	
Zoraida maculicostata	Muir, 1928	n/a	Sierra Leone	11.5 mm (0.45 in)	
Zoraida motschoulskyi	Distant, 1906	n/a	Sri Lanka	11 mm (0.43 in)	
‡Zoraida obsoleta	(Kirby, 1891)	Thracia obsoleta Kirby, 1891	Sri Lanka	12.6 mm (0.50 in)	
§Zoraida ugandensis	Distant, 1914	n/a	Uganda, Senegal, Sierra Leone, Nigeria, Republic of the Congo, Democratic Republic of the Congo	11 mm (0.43 in)	
‡Zoraida vanstallei	Dmitriev, 2020	Zoraida silvicola van Stalle, 1988	Ivory Coast		

== Subgenus Peggiopsis ==
Species in subgenus Peggiopsis
Species	Authority	Basionym	Range	Wing length (Note: Some wing length measurements converted from wingspan (half of wingspan minus 10%))	References
Zoraida aenea	van Stalle, 1983	n/a	Nigeria		
Zoraida distanti	Muir, 1918	n/a	Sierra Leone, Democratic Republic of the Congo, Mozambique, South Africa (KwaZulu-Natal)	13 mm (0.51 in)	
‡Zoraida javana	(Melichar, 1914)	Peggiopsis javana Melichar, 1914	Indonesia (Java)		
Zoraida kempi	Muir, 1922	n/a	India	8 mm (0.31 in)	
Zoraida longa	Yang & Wu, 1993	n/a	Taiwan	♂ 11.4 mm (0.45 in) ♀ 12.3 mm (0.48 in)	
‡Zoraida nivifera	(Walker, 1870)	Thracia nivifera Walker, 1870	Indonesia (Bacan Isl.)	10 mm (0.39 in)	
‡Zoraida punctipennis	(Walker, 1870)	Thracia punctipennis Walker, 1870	Indonesia (Misool Isl.), New Guinea	10 mm (0.39 in)	
‡Zoraida rufifinis	(Walker, 1870)	Thracia punctipennis Walker, 1870	Indonesia (Morotai Isl.)	10 mm (0.39 in)	
Zoraida smedleyi	Muir, 1926	n/a	Indonesia (Mentawai Islands)	10.3 mm (0.41 in)	
Zoraida spectra	Distant, 1911	n/a	India	8 mm (0.31 in)	
Zoraida wallacei	Muir, 1918	n/a	Singapore	12 mm (0.47 in)	

== Subgenus Zoraida ==
Type species: Derbe sinuosa Boheman, 1838

- Zoraida aburiensis Muir, 1918 - Ghana, Democratic Republic of Congo, Sierra Leone, Central African Republic
- Zoraida albida (Walker, 1870) - "Sula" (Indonesia?)
- Zoraida angolensis Synave, 1973 - Angola
- Zoraida bohemani (Westwood, 1841) - new name for Derbe nervosa Boheman 1838) - Sierra Leone, Democratic Republic of Congo, Angola, Madagascar, Zimbabwe, South Africa (KwaZulu-Natal, Transvaal)
- Zoraida borneensis Distant, 1907 - Borneo
- Zoraida boulardi Synave, 1973 - Central African Republic, Togo
- Zoraida ceylonica (Kirby, 1891) - Sri Lanka
- Zoraida confusa Yang & Wu, 1993 - Taiwan
- Zoraida consanguinea Distant, 1907 - Australia (Queensland)
- Zoraida costalis (Walker, 1870) - Indonesia (Bacan Isl., Misool Isl.), New Guinea
- Zoraida cumulata (Walker, 1870) - Indonesia (Ambon Isl., Buru Isl., Sumatra), New Guinea, Philippines, Sri Lanka
- Zoraida curta Yang & Wu, 1993 - Taiwan
- Zoraida cycnoptera Distant, 1907 - Australia (Queensland)
- Zoraida dubia Yang & Wu, 1993 - Taiwan
- Zoraida ephemeralis (Walker, 1870) - Indonesia (Aru Isl., Misool Isl.), New Guinea
- Zoraida erythractis Distant, 1907 - Borneo
- Zoraida essingtonii (Westwood, 1851) - Australia (Northern Territory)
  - Zoraida essingtonii porphyrion Fennah, 1969 - New Caledonia, Australia (QLD)
- Zoraida eupoecila Distant, 1907 - Australia (Queensland)
- Zoraida evansi Distant, 1914 - Ghana, Nigeria
- Zoraida flava Yang & Wu, 1993 - Taiwan
- Zoraida flavocostata Distant, 1914 - Mozambique, Sierra Leone, South Africa, Democratic Republic of Congo, Nigeria
- Zoraida freta Yang & Wu, 1993 - Taiwan
- Zoraida fulgans Muir, 1923 - Madagascar
- Zoraida fuligipennis Muir, 1928 - Sierra Leone, Burkina Faso, Nigeria
- Zoraida furcata Yang & Wu, 1993 - Taiwan
- Zoraida fuscipennis (Walker, 1870) - Indonesia (Aru Isl.)
- Zoraida gravida Yang & Wu, 1993 - Taiwan
- Zoraida histrionica Distant, 1914 - India
- Zoraida horishana Matsumura, 1914 - Japan, Taiwan, South Korea, far-eastern Russia
- Zoraida insolita Yang & Wu, 1993 - Taiwan
- Zoraida kirkaldyi Muir, 1918 - Sri Lanka
- Zoraida koannania Matsumura, 1914 - Taiwan, South Korea
- Zoraida kotoshoensis Matsumura, 1938 - Taiwan
- Zoraida lankana (Kirby, 1891) - Sri Lanka
- Zoraida limnobialis (Walker, 1870) - Philippines (Sulu Isl.)
- Zoraida lusca Yang & Wu, 1993 - Taiwan
- Zoraida nitobii Muir, 1914 - Taiwan
- Zoraida njalensis Muir, 1928 - Sierra Leone, Democratic Republic of Congo, Central African Republic
- Zoraida nyasensis Distant, 1914 - Malawi, Democratic Republic of Congo
- Zoraida pattersoni Distant, 1914 - Ghana, Democratic Republic of Congo, Central African Republic
- Zoraida picta Distant, 1907 - Australia (Queensland)
- Zoraida picturata Distant, 1914 - Malawi
- Zoraida propria Yang & Wu, 1993 - Taiwan
- Zoraida pseudosylvicola Muir, 1913 - Borneo, Indonesia (Krakatao)
- Zoraida pterophoroides (Westwood, 1851) - Taiwan, China, Japan, Malaysia, Burma, Sri Lanka
  - Zoraida pterophoroides fistulator Fennah, 1956 - Palau
- Zoraida ridleyi Muir, 1918 - Singapore
- Zoraida rufivena Distant, 1906 - Sri Lanka
- Zoraida scutellaris (Walker, 1870) - Indonesia (Aru Isl., Misool Isl., Morotai Isl., Buru Isl.), New Guinea, Solomon Islands
- Zoraida separata Yang & Wu, 1993 - Taiwan
- Zoraida sexnotata (Walker, 1870) - Indonesia (Aru Isl., Java), Australia (Queensland)
- Zoraida sinuosa (Boheman, 1838) - Sierra Leone, Guinea, Cameroon, Togo, Nigeria, Democratic Republic of Congo, Central African Republic
- Zoraida sudanica Synave, 1973 - South Sudan, Democratic Republic of Congo, Central African Republic
- Zoraida venusta Yang & Wu, 1993 - Taiwan
- Zoraida zairensis van Stalle, 1983 - Democratic Republic of Congo

== Unassigned to a subgenus ==
- Peggiopsis dorsimaculata Muir, 1917 - Philippines
- Peggiopsis dorsopunctata (Melichar, 1915) - Philippines
- Peggiopsis flavicornis (Melichar, 1915) - Philippines
- Peggiopsis irrorata (Muir, 1917) - Philippines
- Peggiopsis nigrovenosa Muir, 1915 - Indonesia (Java)
- Peggiopsis pallida Muir, 1917 - Philippines
- Peggiopsis pseudoflavicornis Muir, 1917 - Philippines
- Peggiopsis pseudojavana Muir, 1917 - Philippines
- Peggiopsis pseudopuncticosta Muir, 1917 - Philippines
- Peggiopsis puncticosta (Melichar, 1915) - Philippines
- Peggiopsis rufa Muir, 1913 - Indonesia (Ambon)
- Peggiopsis stali Muir, 1917 - Philippines
- Zoraida albicans Anufriev, 1968 - far-eastern Russia, Japan, South Korea
- Zoraida bakeri Muir, 1922 - Borneo
- Zoraida bouchneri Synave, 1982 - Central African Republic, Liberia
- Zoraida brunnipennis Muir, 1922 - India (Assam)
- Zoraida egregia (Melichar, 1903) - Sri Lanka
- Zoraida falsa Muir, 1924 - Philippines
- Zoraida ficta Distant, 1906 - Sri Lanka
- Zoraida flaviventris Muir, 1917 - Philippines
- Zoraida fuliginosa Muir, 1913 - Papua New Guinea
- Zoraida howei Schmidt, 1926 - Indonesia (Buru Isl.)
- Zoraida hubeiensis Chou, Lu, Huang & Wang, 1985 - China, South Korea
- Zoraida hyalina Melichar, 1914 - Indonesia (Java), Philippines
- Zoraida javanica (Westwood, 1840) - Indonesia (Java), Philippines
- Zoraida kalshoveni Muir, 1922 - Singapore, Indonesia (Java)
- Zoraida karnyi Muir, 1926 - Indonesia (Mentawai Islands)
- Zoraida kuwayamae (Matsumura, 1913) - Japan, South Korea
- Zoraida lalokensis Muir, 1913 - Papua New Guinea
- Zoraida laratae Muir, 1913 - Indonesia (Larat Isl., Ambon)
- Zoraida lutescens Muir, 1917 - Philippines
- Zoraida maculata Muir, 1917 - Philippines
- Zoraida maculicosta Schmidt, 1926 - Indonesia (Buru Isl.)
- Zoraida mcgregori Muir, 1922 - Philippines
- Zoraida melichari Muir, 1917 - Philippines
- Zoraida obscura Melichar, 1914 - Indonesia (Java)
- Zoraida padangensis Muir, 1926 - Indonesia (Sumatra)
- Zoraida parvalata Van Stalle, 1988 - Ivory Coast
- Zoraida procterythra Jacobi, 1941 - Indonesia (Lombok Isl.)
- Zoraida rectifrons Van Stalle, 1988 - Ivory Coast
- Zoraida rubrolineata Schmidt, 1926 - Indonesia (Buru Isl.)
- Zoraida sexpunctata Van Stalle, 1988 - Ivory Coast
- Zoraida superba Muir, 1913 - Papua New Guinea
- Zoraida sylvicola Muir, 1913 - Borneo, Indonesia (Mentawai Islands)
- Zoraida taiensis Van Stalle, 1988 - Ivory Coast
- Zoraida westwoodi (Stål, 1870) - Philippines
- Zoraida zeijsti Van Stalle, 1988 - Ivory Coast
