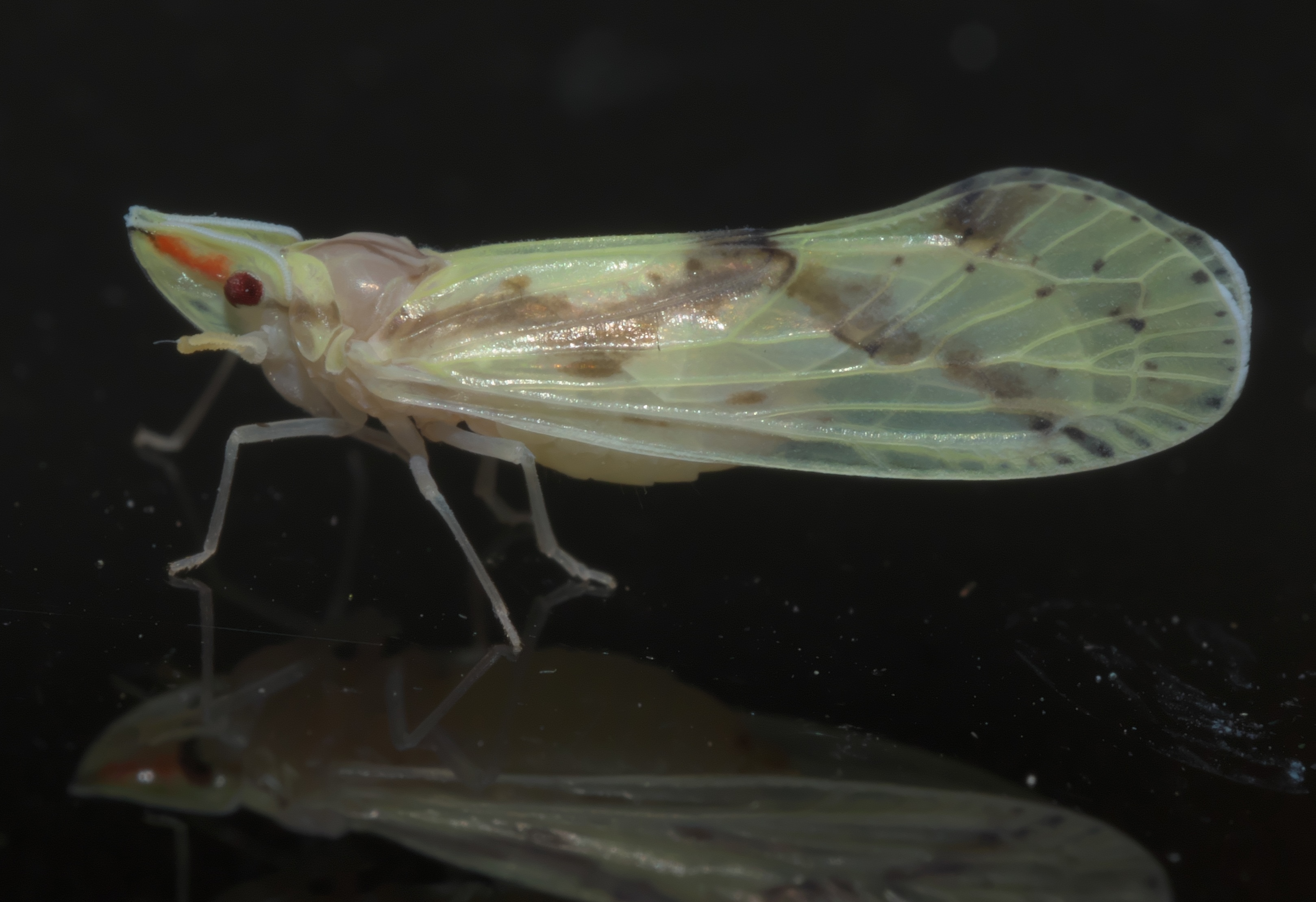
- Otiocerus wolfii

Scientific classification
- Kingdom: Animalia
- Phylum: Arthropoda
- Clade: Pancrustacea
- Class: Insecta
- Order: Hemiptera
- Suborder: Auchenorrhyncha
- Infraorder: Fulgoromorpha
- Family: Derbidae
- Subfamily: Otiocerinae
- Tribe: Otiocerini; Muir, 1917

= Otiocerini =

Tribe of true hoppers

Otiocerini is a tribe of planthoppers in the family Derbidae.

== Genera ==
The following genera are included in the World Auchenorrhyncha Database

- Anomaladerbe Muir, 1922
- Anotia Kirby, 1821
- Apache Kirkaldy, 1901
- Archara Metcalf, 1945
- Banksiella Muir, 1917
- Basileocephalus Kirkaldy, 1906
- Cobacella Fennah, 1952
- Dendrokara Melichar, 1914
- Deribia Westwood, 1842
- Eusyphax Fennah, 1956
- Flaccia Stål, 1866
- Harpanor Fennah, 1950
- Heronax Kirkaldy, 1906
- Homometria Fennah, 1952
- Kaha Kirkaldy, 1906
- Kampulokara Muir, 1913
- Kubilaya Koçak & Kemal, 2010
- Kuranda Distant, 1907
- Labicerus Erichson, 1849
- Litophallus Bahder & Bartlett, 2025
- Makula Distant, 1907
- Mysidioides Matsumura, 1905
- Neodendrokara Muir, 1917
- Nesocore Kirkaldy, 1907
- Nesokaha Muir, 1913
- Nesoneura Kirkaldy, 1907
- Nesoniphas Kirkaldy, 1907
- Niphadodite Kirkaldy, 1907
- Otiocerus Kirby, 1821
- Paralyricen Muir, 1913
- Pepleuca Emeljanov, 1999
- Phra Distant, 1911
- Platocera Muir, 1913
- Platocerella Fennah, 1952
- Platonax Metcalf, 1938
- Pyrrhoneura Kirkaldy, 1906
- Sayiana Ball, 1928
- Shellenius Ball, 1928
- Swezeyia Kirkaldy, 1906
