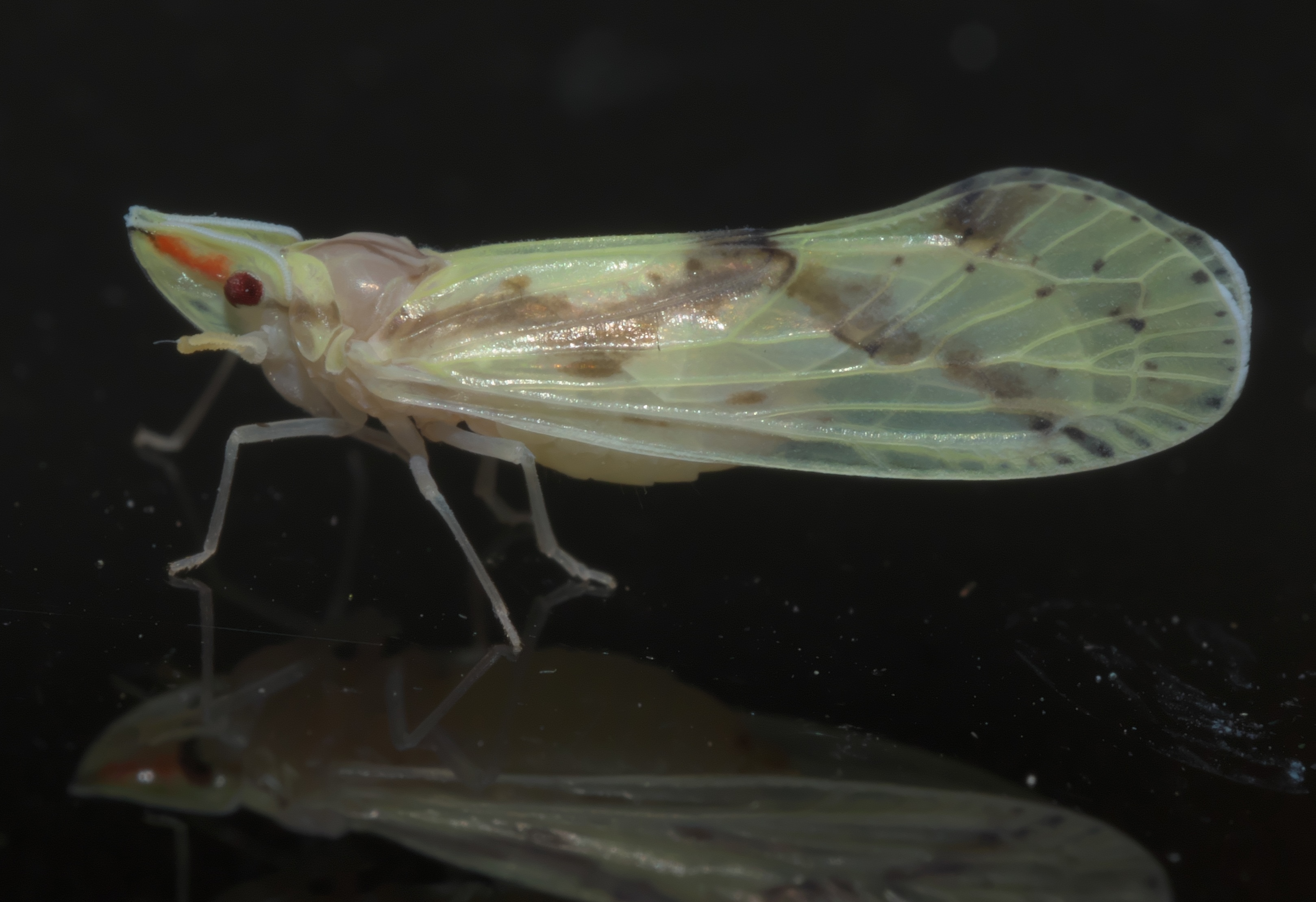
- Otiocerus wolfii

Scientific classification
- Kingdom: Animalia
- Phylum: Arthropoda
- Class: Insecta
- Order: Hemiptera
- Suborder: Auchenorrhyncha
- Infraorder: Fulgoromorpha
- Family: Derbidae
- Tribe: Otiocerini
- Genus: Otiocerus; Kirby, 1821

= Otiocerus =

Genus of true bugs

Otiocerus is a genus of derbid planthoppers in the family Derbidae. There are about 16 described species in Otiocerus.

== Species ==
These 14 species belong to the genus Otiocerus:

- Otiocerus abbotii Kirby, 1821^{c g b}
- Otiocerus amyotii Fitch, 1856^{c g b}
- Otiocerus breviceps Fowler, 1900^{c g}
- Otiocerus coquebertii Kirby, 1821^{c g b}
- Otiocerus francilloni Kirby, 1821^{c g b}
- Otiocerus kirbyii^{b}
- Otiocerus reaumurii Kirby, 1821^{c g b}
- Otiocerus regalis Fennah, 1952^{c g}
- Otiocerus rubilineatus Chen, Dietrich & Zhang, 2025
- Otiocerus schoenherri Stal, 1859^{c g}
- Otiocerus shamshir Bitar & Domahovski, 2025
- Otiocerus stollii (Kirby, 1821)^{c g b}
- Otiocerus venusta Fowler, 1900^{c g}
- Otiocerus wolfii Kirby, 1821^{c g b}

Data sources: i = ITIS, c = Catalogue of Life, g = GBIF, b = Bugguide.net
