= Sayiana =

Scientific classification
- Kingdom: Animalia
- Phylum: Arthropoda
- Class: Insecta
- Order: Hemiptera
- Suborder: Auchenorrhyncha
- Infraorder: Fulgoromorpha
- Family: Derbidae
- Tribe: Otiocerini
- Genus: Sayiana; Ball, 1928

Genus of insects

Sayiana is a genus of planthoppers belonging to the subfamily Otiocerinae.

== Species ==
The following species are recognised in the genus Saiyana:

- Sayiana maracasa Fennah, 1952
- Sayiana puertoricensis Caldwell, 1951
- Sayiana sayi (Ball, 1902)
- Sayiana viequensis Caldwell, 1951
