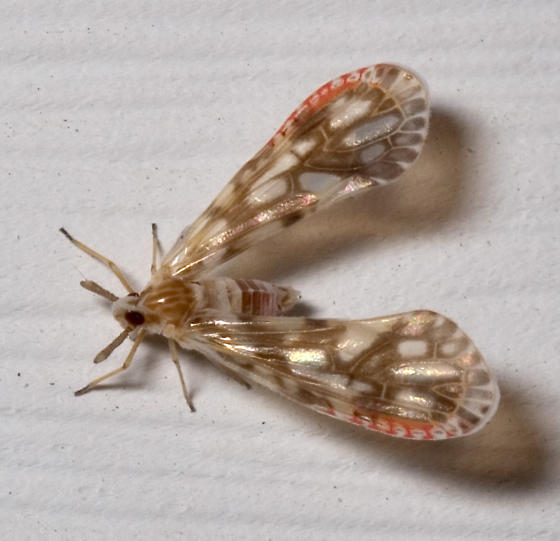
- Anotia bonnetii

Scientific classification
- Domain: Eukaryota
- Kingdom: Animalia
- Phylum: Arthropoda
- Class: Insecta
- Order: Hemiptera
- Suborder: Auchenorrhyncha
- Infraorder: Fulgoromorpha
- Family: Derbidae
- Tribe: Otiocerini
- Genus: Anotia; Kirby, 1821

= Anotia (planthopper) =

Genus of true bugs

Anotia is a genus of derbid planthoppers in the family Derbidae. There are at least 20 described species in Anotia.

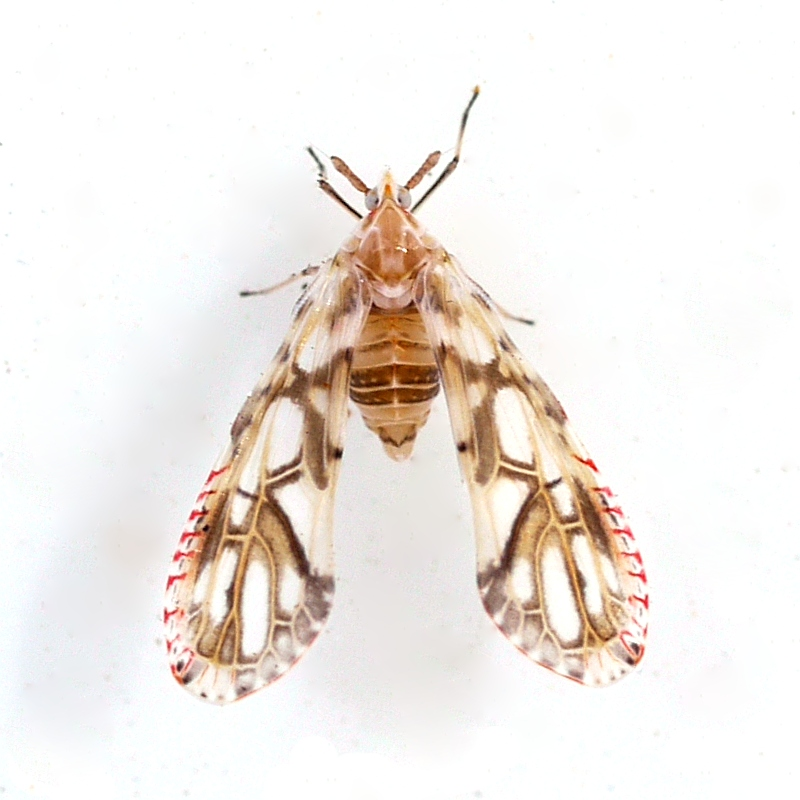
Anotia kirkaldyi

== Species ==
These 22 species belong to the genus Anotia:

- Anotia bonnetii Kirby, 1821^{c g b}
- Anotia burnetii Fitch, 1856^{c g}
- Anotia caliginosa Ball, 1937^{c g b}
- Anotia fitchi Van Duzee, 1893^{c g b}
- Anotia formaster Fennah, 1952^{c g}
- Anotia invalida Fowler, 1904^{c g}
- Anotia kirkaldyi Ball, 1902^{c g b}
- Anotia lineata Ball, 1937^{c g}
- Anotia marginicornis Fowler, 1904^{c g}
- Anotia mcateei (Dozier, 1928)^{c g}
- Anotia pellucida Fowler, 1904^{c g}
- Anotia punctata Metcalf, 1938^{c g}
- Anotia robertsonii Fitch, 1856^{c g b}
- Anotia rubrinoda Fennah, 1952^{c g}
- Anotia ruficornis Fowler, 1904^{c g}
- Anotia sanguinea Fennah, 1952^{c g}
- Anotia septentrionalis Anufriev, 1968^{c g}
- Anotia smithi Fowler, 1904^{c g}
- Anotia tenella Fowler, 1904^{c g}
- Anotia uhleri (Van Duzee, 1889)^{c g b}
- Anotia westwoodi Fitch, 1856^{c g}
- Anotia westwoodii Fitch^{b}

Data sources: i = ITIS, c = Catalogue of Life, g = GBIF, b = Bugguide.net
