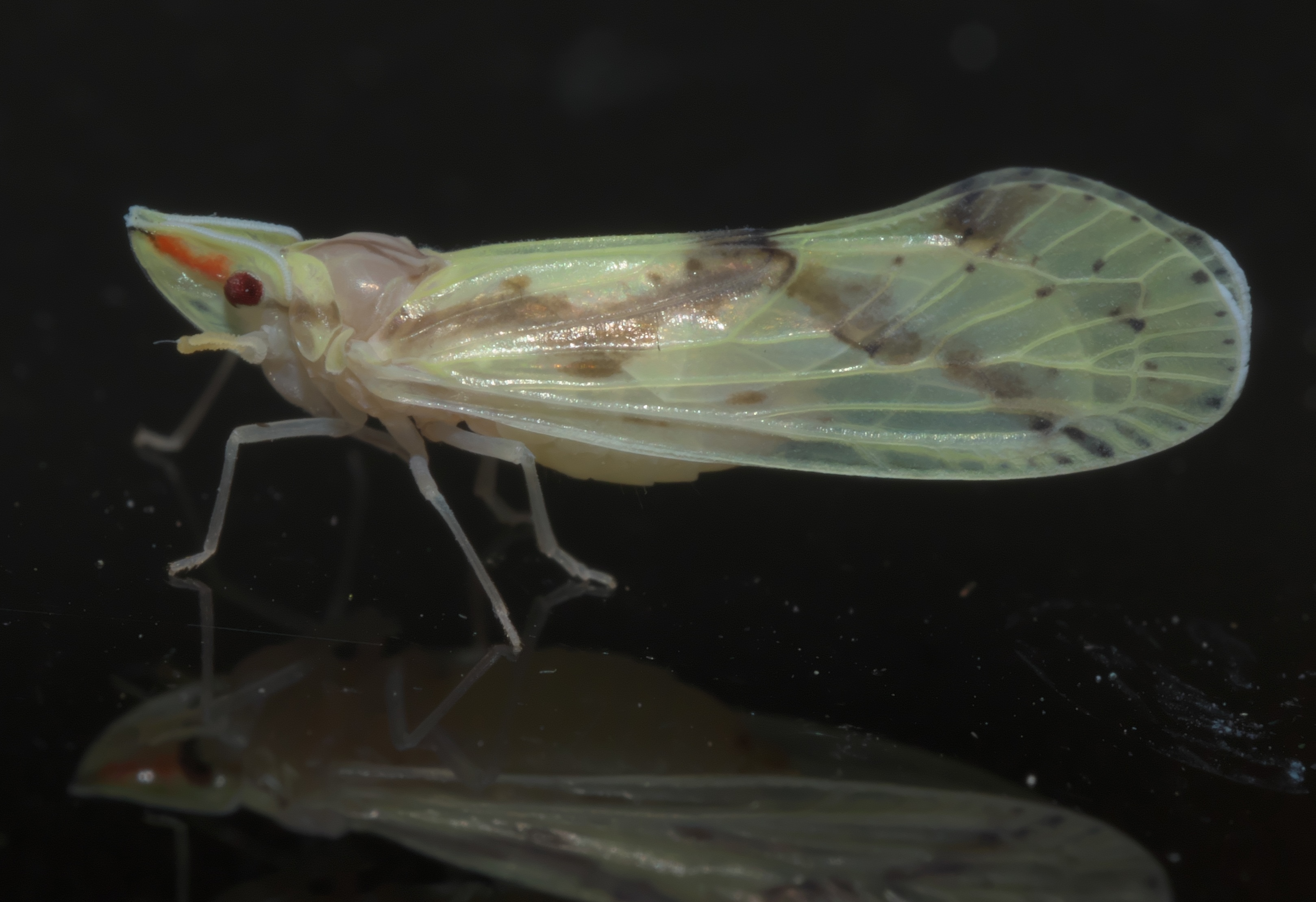

Scientific classification
- Kingdom: Animalia
- Phylum: Arthropoda
- Clade: Pancrustacea
- Class: Insecta
- Order: Hemiptera
- Suborder: Auchenorrhyncha
- Infraorder: Fulgoromorpha
- Family: Derbidae
- Genus: Otiocerus
- Species: O. wolfii

Binomial name
- Otiocerus wolfii Kirby, 1821

= Otiocerus wolfii =

Species of Derbid planthopper

Otiocerus wolfii is a species of derbid planthopper in the family Derbidae. from Canada (Ontario) and the United States (various states).

== Identification ==
This species can be distinguished from other species of Otiocerus with overlapping ranges by the following features:

- Lacking any red on the forewings (vs O. coquebertii, reaumurii & stollii)
- Having a red stripe on the head laterally (vs O. francilloni and abbotii)
- Having a solid line on the forewing (vs. Otiocerus kirbyii, with unicolorous wings)

One species, Otiocerus amyotti, can only be differentiated from this species by the absence of a small one on the side of the head connecting the apex of the head and the red stripe in the current species, and the stripe of the tegmina reaching the apical margin of the tegmina (not the apical part of the sutral margin)
