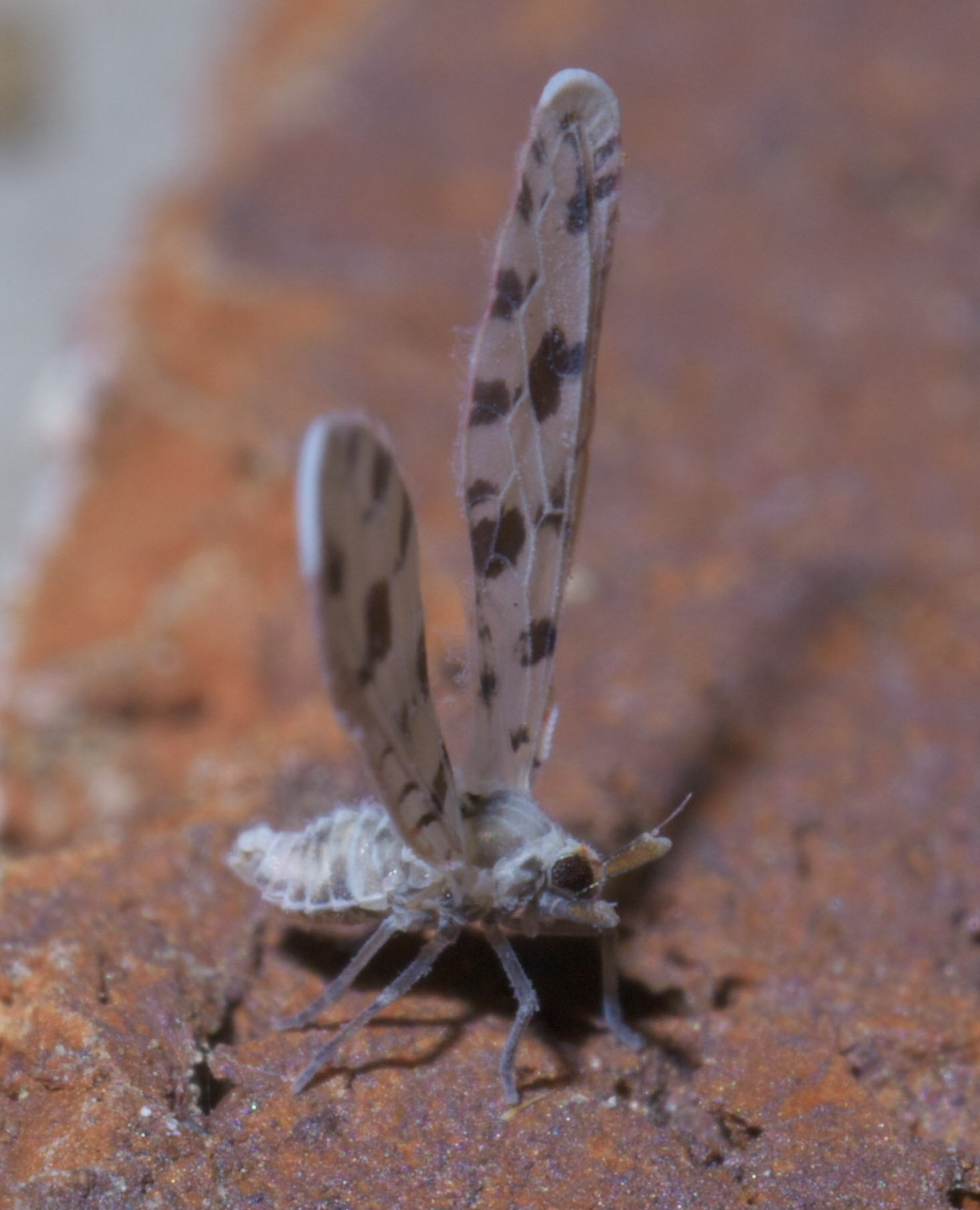

Scientific classification
- Domain: Eukaryota
- Kingdom: Animalia
- Phylum: Arthropoda
- Class: Insecta
- Order: Hemiptera
- Suborder: Auchenorrhyncha
- Infraorder: Fulgoromorpha
- Family: Derbidae
- Genus: Sikaiana
- Species: S. harti

Binomial name
- Sikaiana harti (Metcalf, 1923)

= Sikaiana harti =

Species of true bug

Sikaiana harti is a species of derbid planthopper in the family Derbidae.

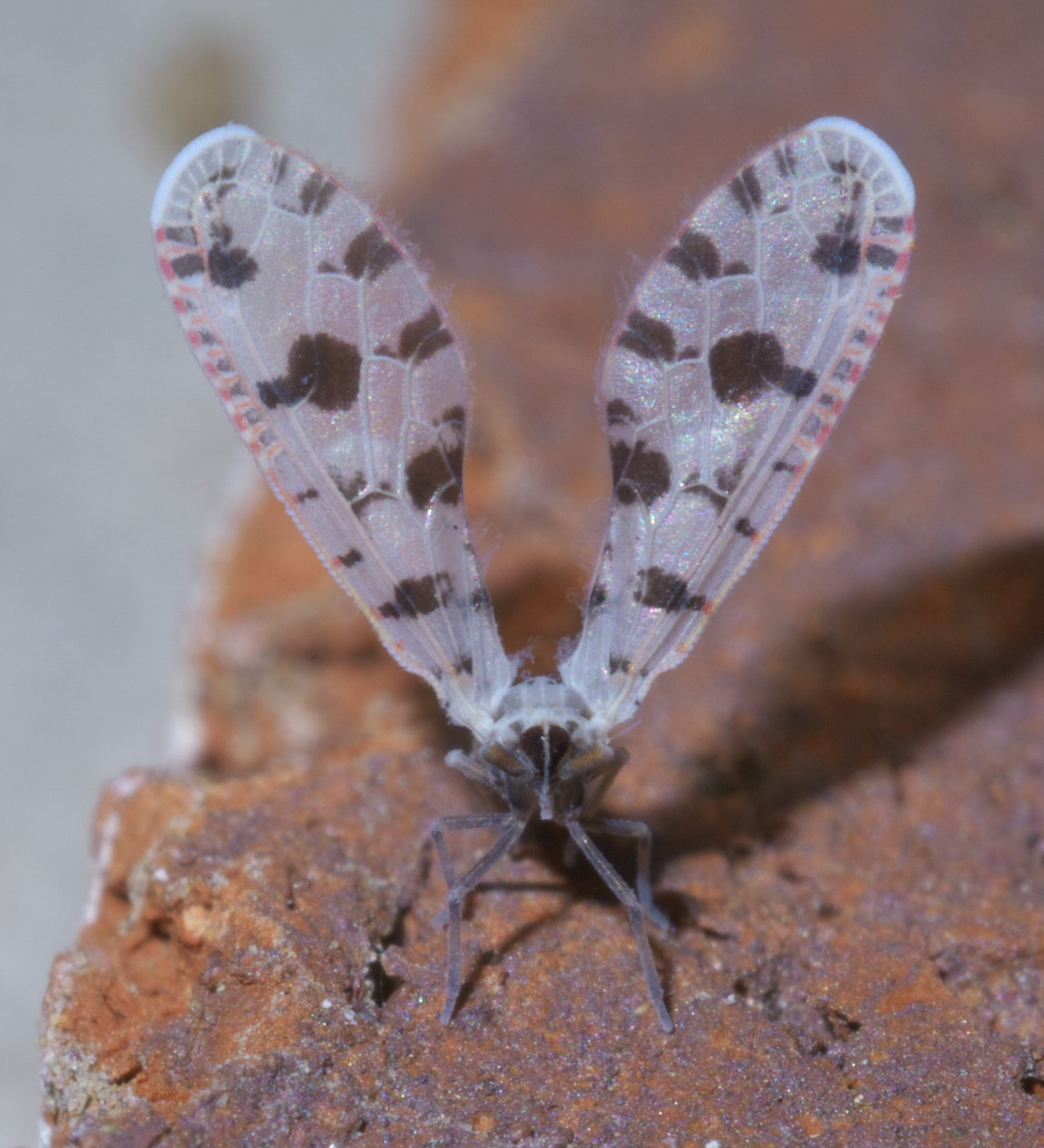
