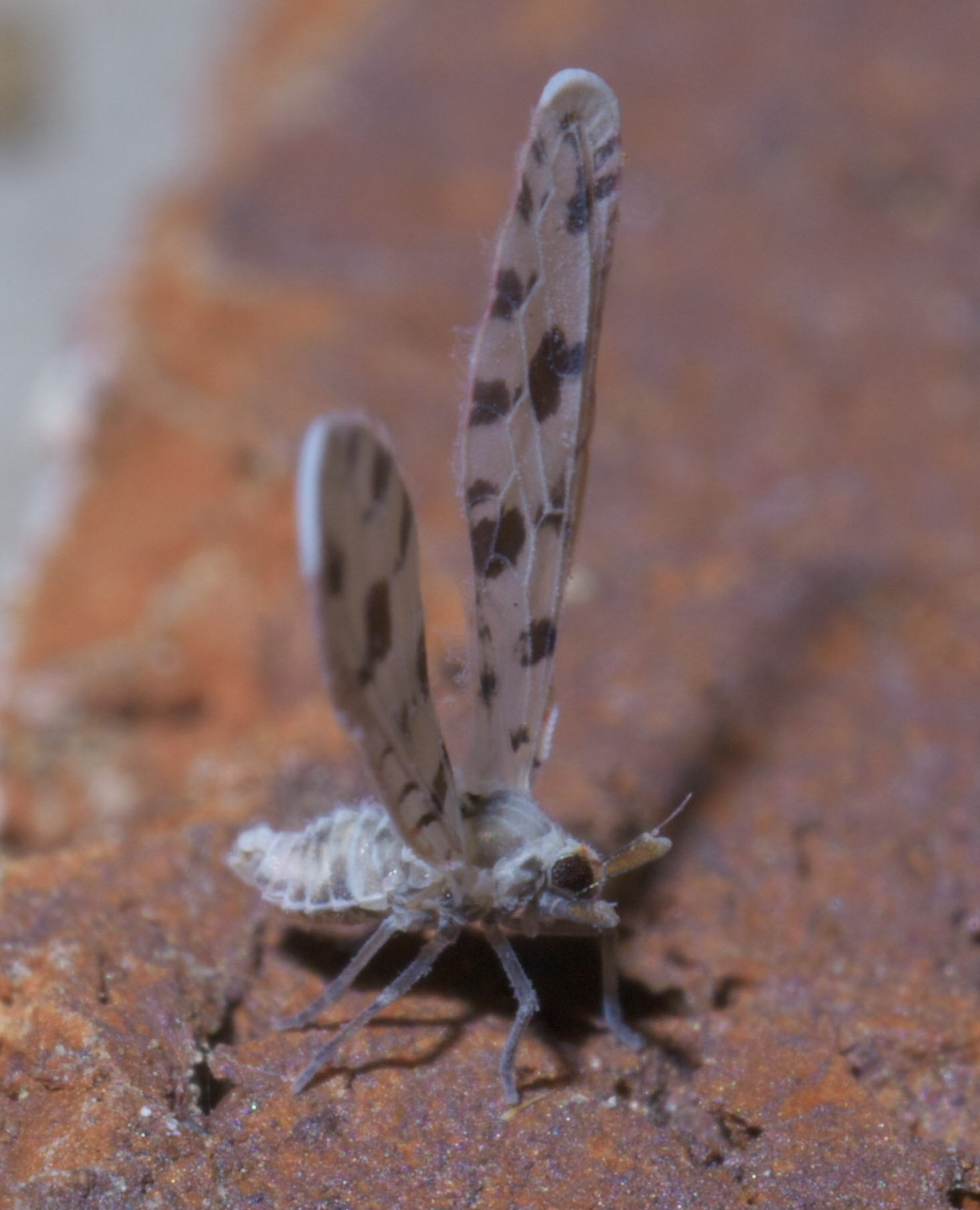
- Sikaiana harti

Scientific classification
- Kingdom: Animalia
- Phylum: Arthropoda
- Clade: Pancrustacea
- Class: Insecta
- Order: Hemiptera
- Suborder: Auchenorrhyncha
- Infraorder: Fulgoromorpha
- Family: Derbidae
- Tribe: Sikaianini
- Genus: Sikaiana

= Sikaiana (planthopper) =

Genus of true bugs

Sikaiana is a genus of derbid planthoppers in the family Derbidae. There are about 17 described species in Sikaiana.

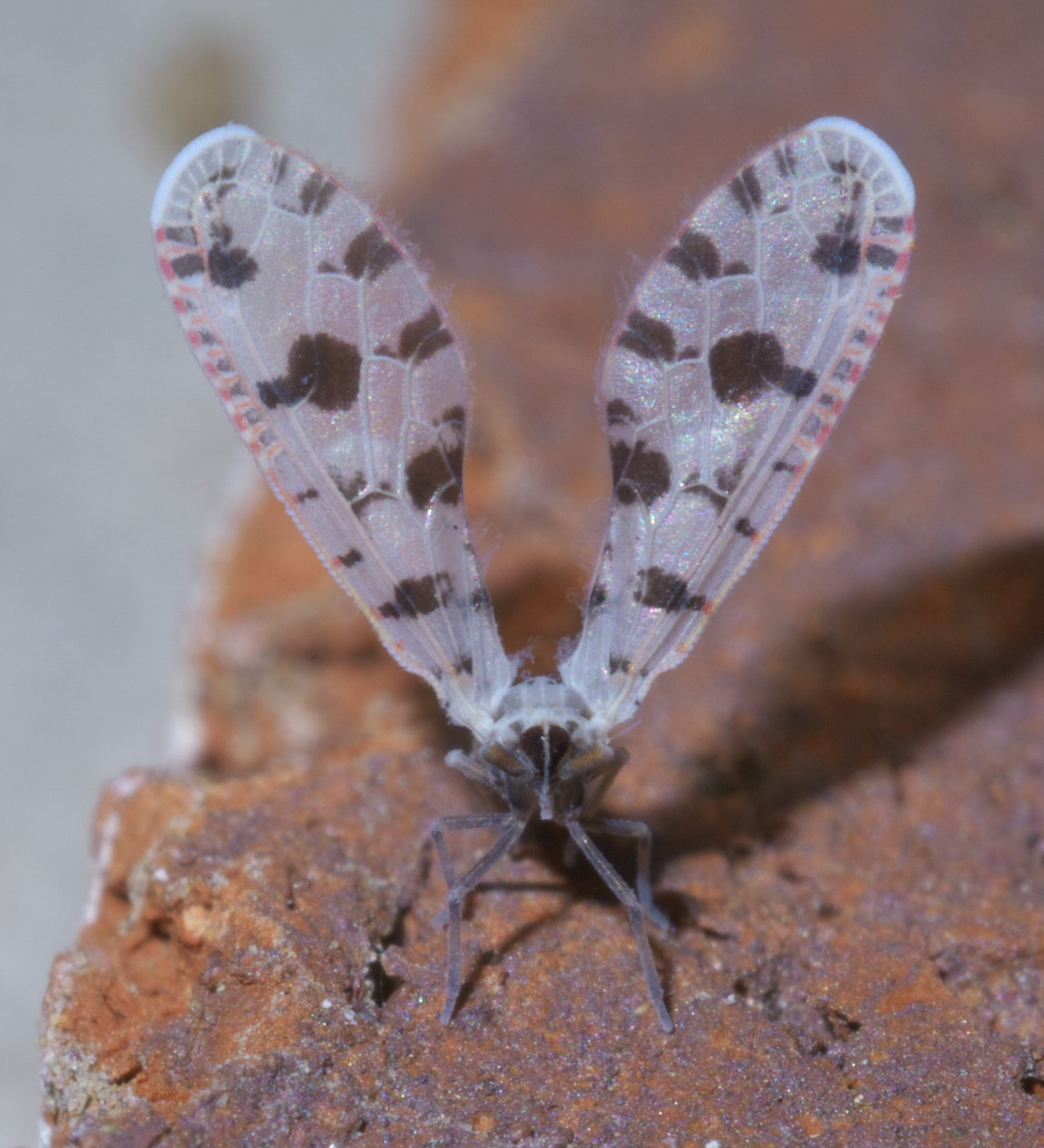
Sikaiana harti

== Species ==
These 17 species belong to the genus Sikaiana:

- Sikaiana africana Muir, 1926^{c g}
- Sikaiana albomaculata (Distant, 1917)^{c g}
- Sikaiana caenosa Muir, 1913^{c g}
- Sikaiana clymene Muir, 1913^{c g}
- Sikaiana flammeivittata Fennah, 1950^{c g}
- Sikaiana fulva Muir, 1913^{c g}
- Sikaiana harti Metcalf, 1923^{c g b}
- Sikaiana hyalinata Distant, 1907^{c g}
- Sikaiana laelaps Fennah, 1970^{c g}
- Sikaiana lycotas Fennah, 1969^{c g}
- Sikaiana maculosa Distant, 1907^{c g}
- Sikaiana makii Muir, 1915^{c g}
- Sikaiana nesiope Kirkaldy, 1907^{c g}
- Sikaiana nigrimaculata Muir, 1913^{c g}
- Sikaiana palaui Fennah, 1956^{c g}
- Sikaiana straminea Muir, 1913^{c g}
- Sikaiana vitriceps Muir, 1917^{c g}

Data sources: i = ITIS, c = Catalogue of Life, g = GBIF, b = Bugguide.net
