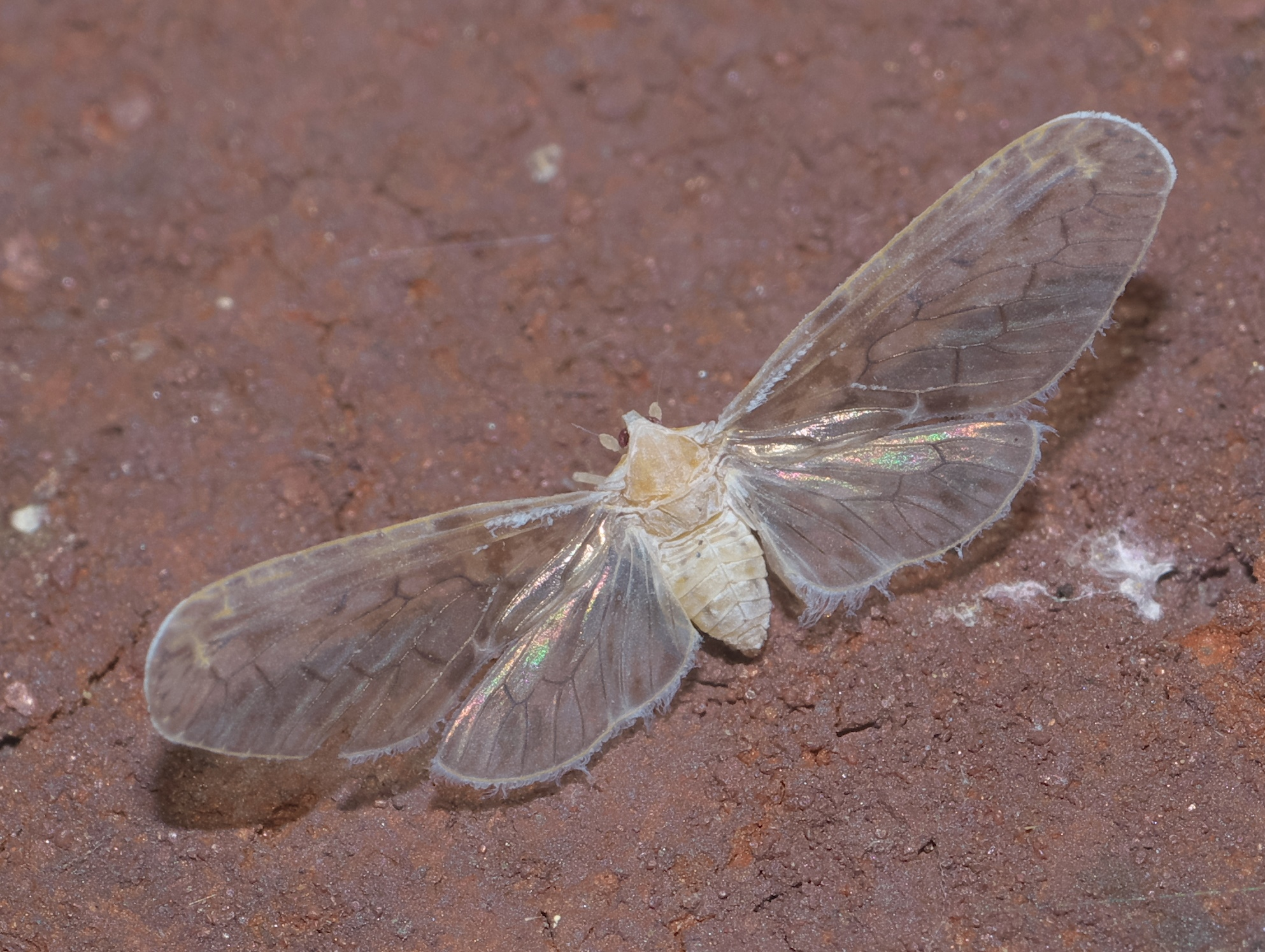

Scientific classification
- Domain: Eukaryota
- Kingdom: Animalia
- Phylum: Arthropoda
- Class: Insecta
- Order: Hemiptera
- Suborder: Auchenorrhyncha
- Infraorder: Fulgoromorpha
- Family: Derbidae
- Genus: Paramysidia
- Species: P. mississippiensis

Binomial name
- Paramysidia mississippiensis (Dozier, 1922)

= Paramysidia mississippiensis =

Species of true bug

Paramysidia mississippiensis is a species of derbid planthopper in the family Derbidae.

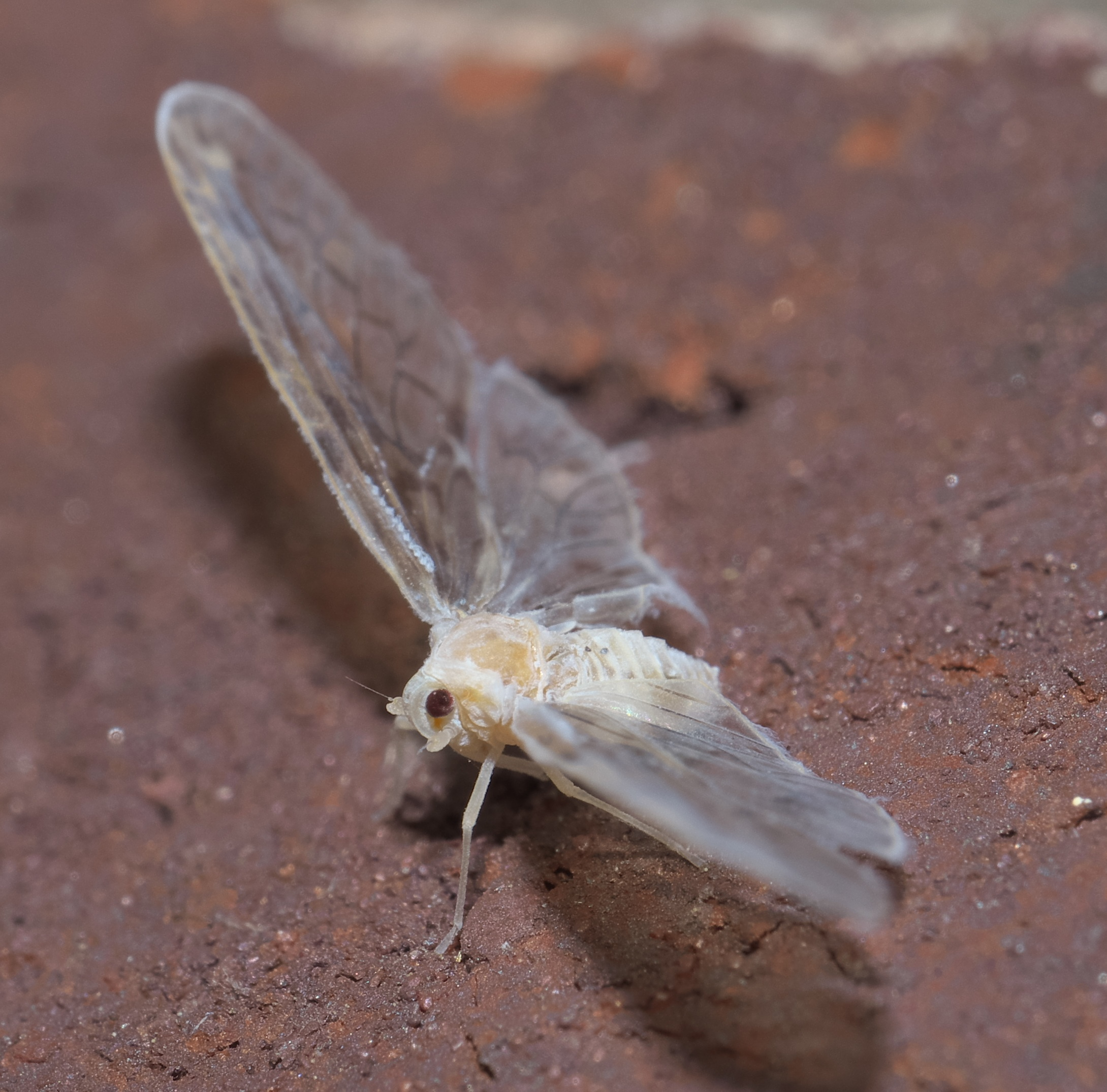
