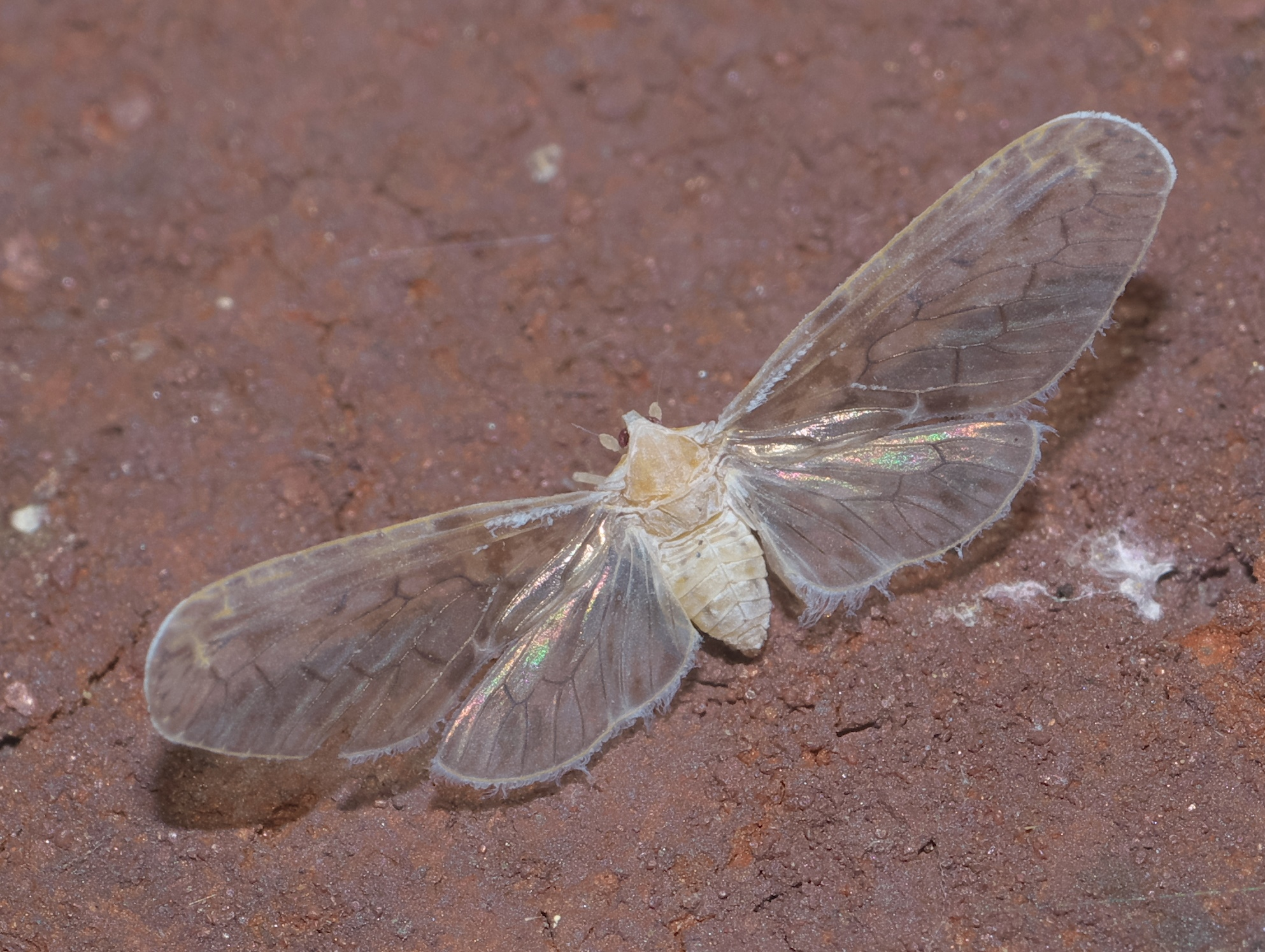
- Paramysidia mississippiensis

Scientific classification
- Domain: Eukaryota
- Kingdom: Animalia
- Phylum: Arthropoda
- Class: Insecta
- Order: Hemiptera
- Suborder: Auchenorrhyncha
- Infraorder: Fulgoromorpha
- Family: Derbidae
- Tribe: Derbini
- Genus: Paramysidia; Broomfield, 1985

= Paramysidia =

Genus of true bugs

Paramysidia is a genus of derbid planthoppers in the family Derbidae. There are about seven described species in Paramysidia.

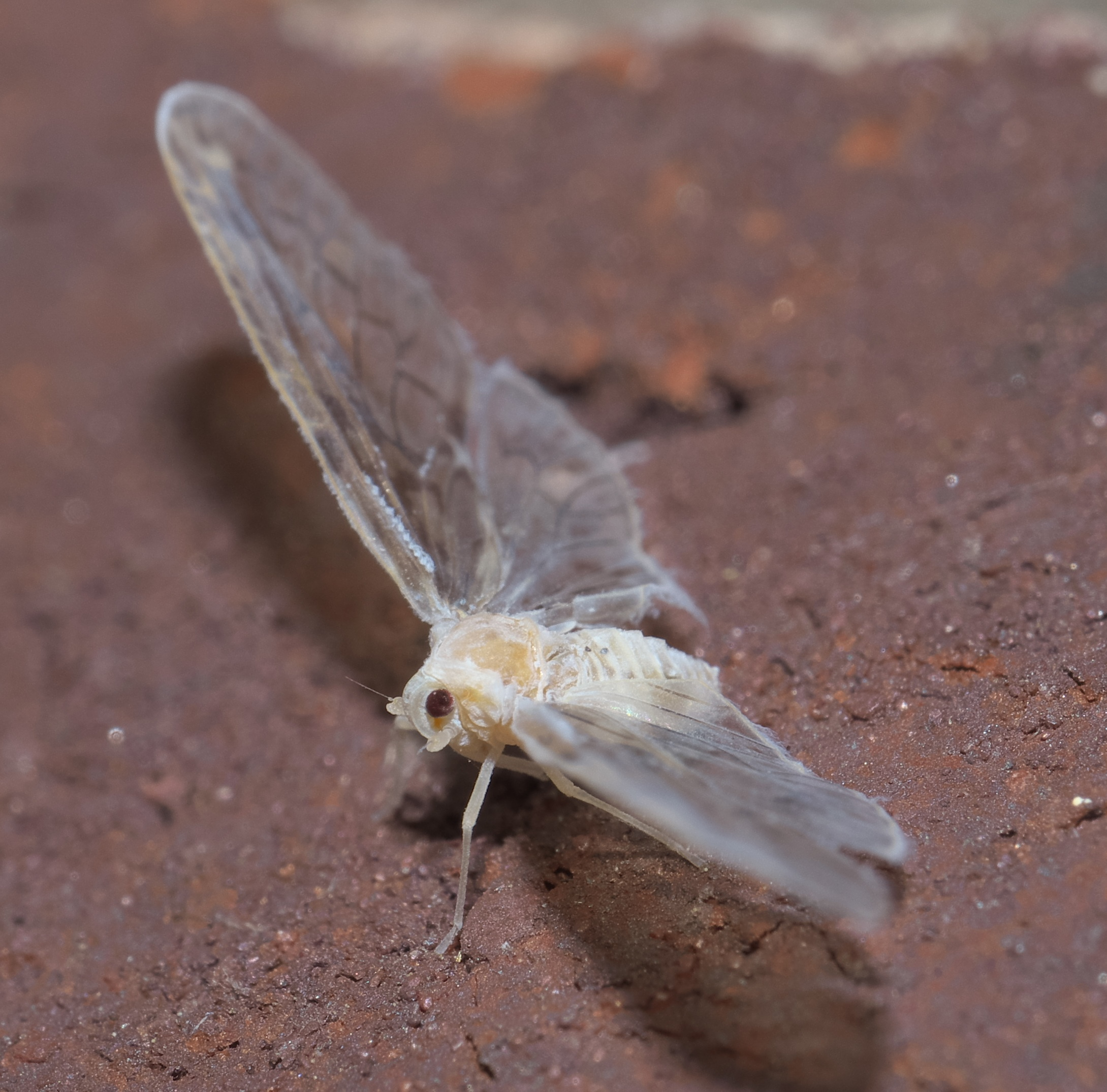
Paramysidia mississippiensis

== Species ==
These seven species belong to the genus Paramysidia:

- Paramysidia barbara Broomfield, 1985^{c g}
- Paramysidia boudica Broomfield, 1985^{c g}
- Paramysidia felix Broomfield, 1985^{c g}
- Paramysidia mississippiensis (Dozier, 1922)^{c g b}
- Paramysidia nigropunctata (Metcalf, 1938)^{c g}
- Paramysidia tessellata Broomfield, 1985^{c g}
- Paramysidia vulgaris Broomfield, 1985^{c g}

Data sources: i = ITIS, c = Catalogue of Life, g = GBIF, b = Bugguide.net
