= Victoria Bridge, Devonport =

Victoria Bridge
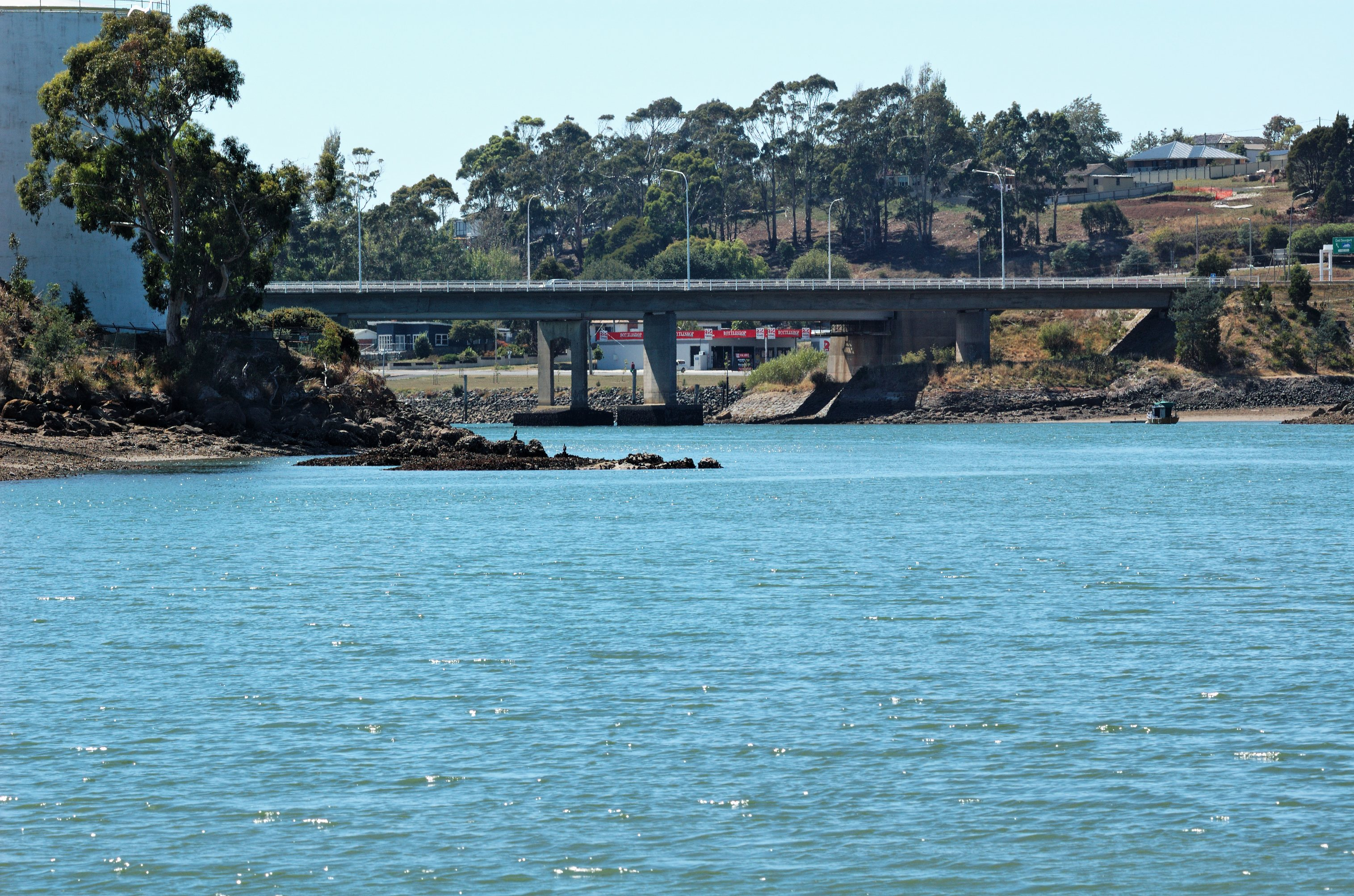
- Victoria Bridge view from the Southern Aspect
- Coordinates: 41°11′34″S 146°22′2″E
- Carries: Bass Highway
- Crosses: Mersey River
- Locale: Devonport, Tasmania, Australia
- Official name: Victoria Bridge
- Maintained by: Building Tasmania

Characteristics
- Design: Prestressed concrete Girder

History
- Opened: 1901; 1973 (reopened)

Location
- Interactive map of Victoria Bridge

The original Victoria Bridge on the Mersey River, Devonport, Tasmania, Australia was opened in 1901, causing the reduction of boat and ferry traffic.

The Victoria Bridge partly collapsed as a result of the continuous boring by teredo worms in 1924.

In 1973 a new concrete bridge replaced the old, battered Victoria Bridge, with the Bass Highway, a national highway (Highway 1), being the main arterial road dividing the suburb of Devonport from the suburbs of Miandetta and Stony Rise on the western side of the city and East Devonport and Ambelside on the eastern side of the city.

A permanent speed camera at East Devonport near Victoria Bridge was installed on the 18th of November, 2015.

On a crossing of the Victoria Bridge there is a good view of the port and its facilities. Most travellers look out to see if the Spirit of Tasmania I or Spirit of Tasmania II are in port or the trader vessels Searoad Mersey or Searoad Tamar. Enhancing the view of the boats in port is the Julie Burgess a wooden tall ship.

The Victoria Bridge is used by the Port of Devonport Authority as its boundary for the port.

Inland Fisheries (Recreational Fishing) Regulations 1999 lists waters of the Mersey River, below the Victoria Bridge at Devonport that it is allowable for a person may to take indigenous fish without an angling licence.

Local Businesses have taken on the name of the bridge incorporating it into their business name.

== Incidents ==
Deputy Commissioner Lewis was the only passenger in a motor vehicle which left the road at the eastern end of the Victoria Bridge at Devonport and plunged into the Mersey River on 3 August 1959.
