= Eugenana, Tasmania =

Eugenana
- Suburb
- Interactive map of Eugenana
- Coordinates: 41°14′6″S 146°18′23″E
- Country: Australia
- State: Tasmania
- Region: North-west and west
- City: Devonport
- LGA: City of Devonport
- Location: 9 km (5.6 mi) SW of Devonport

Government
  - State electorate: Braddon
  - Federal division: Braddon

Population
  - Total: 169 (SAL 2021)
- Postcode: 7310
Suburbs around Eugenana
Forthside	Tugrah	Quoiba
Melrose	Eugenana	Spreyton
Melrose	Melrose	Aberdeen

Eugenana is a rural locality in the local government area (LGA) of Devonport in the North-west and west LGA region of Tasmania. The locality is about 9 kilometres (5.6 mi) south-west of the town of Devonport. The 2021 census recorded a population of 169 for the state suburb of Eugenana. It is a rural suburb of Devonport. Lake Eugenana, which is 123 metres above sea level, is situated here.

There is a caravan park situated by the lake.

The Tasmanian Arboretum, 60ha of park, consisting of flora and fauna is at Eugenana.

== History ==
Eugenana was gazetted as a locality in 1962. The name is believed to be an Aboriginal word for "eaglehawk". A postal receiving office opened in 1917, was converted to a post office about 1926, and closed in 1972.

== Geography ==
The Don River forms part of the south-eastern boundary, before flowing through to the north.

== Road infrastructure ==
Route C146 (Melrose Road) runs through from south-east to west.
