= Aberdeen, Tasmania =

Aberdeen
- Town
- Coordinates: 41°14′39″S 146°19′35″E
- Country: Australia
- State: Tasmania
- Region: North-west and west
- LGA: Devonport
- Location: 10 km (6.2 mi) S of Devonport

Government
  - State electorate: Braddon
  - Federal division: Braddon

Population
  - Total: 268 (2021 census)
- Postcode: 7310
Localities around Aberdeen
Eugenana	Eugenana	Spreyton
Eugenana	Aberdeen	Spreyton
Melrose	Acacia Hills	South Spreyton, Acacia Hills

Aberdeen is a rural locality in the local government area (LGA) of Devonport in the North-west and west LGA region of Tasmania. The locality is about 10 kilometres (6.2 mi) south of the town of Devonport. The 2021 census recorded a population of 268 for Aberdeen.

== History ==
Aberdeen was gazetted as a locality in 1963. The name was not in official use until about 1915.

Coal was discovered in the area in 1855, and Scottish miners may have unofficially named it Aberdeen.

== Geography ==
The Don River flows through the south-west corner and then forms much of the western boundary.

== Road infrastructure ==
Route C146 (Melrose Road) runs through from north to south-east.
