= Melrose, Tasmania =

Melrose
- Town
- Coordinates: 41°15′11″S 146°18′08″E
- Country: Australia
- State: Tasmania
- Region: North West
- LGA: Devonport, Kentish
- Location: 14 km (8.7 mi) SW of Devonport

Government
  - State electorate: Braddon, Lyons
  - Federal division: Braddon, Lyons

Population
  - Total: 102 (2016 census)
- Postcode: 7310
Localities around Melrose
Forthside	Forthside	Tugrah
Forthside	Melrose	Eugenana, Aberdeen
Paloona	Lower Barrington	Acacia Hills

Melrose is a locality and small rural community in the local government areas of Devonport and Kentish in the North West region of Tasmania. It is located about 14 kilometres (8.7 mi) south-west of the town of Devonport. The 2016 census determined a population of 102 for the state suburb of Melrose.

== History ==
The name "Melrose" was used for a post station in the district in 1888. A railway station on the former Don River Line was renamed Melrose about 1916. Two options for the source of the name are:

- Melrose, a town in Scotland
- George Melrose, a surveyor who worked in the area in 1853, who is believed to have named Melrose Creek after himself

The Jeffery and Denney families were prominent in the area for some time with both families running the post office and farming in the area. Arthur and Robina Denney ran the post office and farmed in the areas. Robina was a Jeffrey before marrying Arthur. They had four children and later in life lived in Devonport. The families intermarried. Arthur and Robina were first cousins and shared grandparents. Many families intermarried as a result of the lack of men after World War 1.

Melrose was gazetted as a locality in 1962.

== Geography ==
The Don River forms part of the eastern boundary. Porcupine Hill Forest Reserve abuts part of the western boundary.

== Road infrastructure ==
The C145 route enters the locality from the north as Bellamy Road, becomes Melrose Road, and exits to the south-west as Paloona Road. Route C146 (Melrose Road) starts at an intersection with route C145 and exits to the north-east. Melrose Road continues south-east as Route C147 before exiting to the south.

== See also ==
- Locations in Australia with a Scottish name
