= East Devonport =

Eastern suburb of Devonport, Tasmania

- Suburb
- Norton Way, East Devonport, in February 2007

- Coordinates: 41°10′49″S 146°22′02″E
- Country: Australia
- State: Tasmania
- Region: Devonport
- LGA: Devonport City Council
- Established: 1850

Government
  - State electorate: Braddon
  - Federal division: Braddon

Population
  - Total: 4,384 (2021 census)
- Postcode: 7310
- Mean max temp: 17.0 °C (62.6 °F)
- Mean min temp: 8.3 °C (46.9 °F)
- Annual rainfall: 773.0 mm (30.43 in)
Suburbs around East Devonport
Mersey River	Bass Strait	Wesley Vale
Mersey River	East Devonport	Wesley Vale
Mersey River	Ambleside	Latrobe

East Devonport is a port and residential suburb in Devonport, Tasmania, Australia. The suburb is the location of the Spirit of Tasmania and SeaRoad terminals. The 2021 census recorded a population of 4,384.

== History ==
East Devonport is a confirmed locality.

Sometime around August or November of 2024, construction started to build a new Spirit of Tasmania terminal for the new Spirit of Tasmania V. Although the construction for the new terminal had many delays, it finally opened on 24 October, 2026.

== Geography ==
The Mersey River, the Bass Strait and farmland surrounds the suburb.

== Road infrastructure ==
The Bass Highway goes through the boundary of the suburb but does not go through the suburb, while Tarleton Street intersects with the Bass Highway, which then Tarleton Street provides access to the locality.
