= Devonport City =

Devonport City may refer:

- Devonport City FC, an Australian soccer team
- City of Devonport, the local government of the city of Devonport, Australia
- Devonport, Tasmania, a city in Australia
