= Lillico, Tasmania =

Lillico
- Town
- Coordinates: 41°09′56″S 146°17′25″E
- Country: Australia
- State: Tasmania
- Region: North-west and west
- LGA: Devonport
- Location: 8 km (5.0 mi) NW of Devonport

Government
  - State electorate: Braddon
  - Federal division: Braddon

Population
  - Total: 25 (2016 census)
- Postcode: 7310
Localities around Lillico
Leith	Bass Strait	Don
Leith	Lillico	Don
Forth	Forth	Don

Lillico is a rural locality in the local government area (LGA) of Devonport in the North-west and west LGA region of Tasmania. The locality is about 8 kilometres (5.0 mi) north-west of the town of Devonport. The 2016 census recorded a population of 25 for the state suburb of Lillico.

== History ==
Lillico was gazetted as a locality in 1962. It is believed to be named for Alexander Lillico, a Tasmanian politician who represented the area from 1924 to 1954.

== Geography ==
The waters of Bass Strait form the northern boundary. The Western Railway Line passes through from east to north-west.

== Road infrastructure ==
National Highway 1 (Bass Highway) runs through from east to north-west.
