= Forthside =

- Town
- Coordinates: 41°13′28″S 146°16′25″E
- Country: Australia
- State: Tasmania
- Region: North-west and west
- LGA: Devonport
- Location: 12 km (7.5 mi) SW of Devonport

Government
  - State electorate: Braddon
  - Federal division: Braddon

Population
  - Total: 81 (2016 census)
- Postcode: 7310
Localities around Forthside
Forth	Don	Tugrah
Kindred, Forth	Forthside	Melrose
Kindred	Paloona	Paloona

Forthside is a rural locality in the local government area (LGA) of Devonport in the North-west and west LGA region of Tasmania. The locality is about 12 kilometres (7.5 mi) south-west of the town of Devonport. The 2016 census recorded a population of 81 for the state suburb of Forthside.

== History ==
Forthside is a confirmed locality.

== Geography ==
The Forth River forms much of the western boundary, and the Don River forms a small part of the eastern.

== Road infrastructure ==
Route C145 (Forthside Road / Bellamy Road) runs through from north-west to east.
