= Quoiba, Tasmania =

Quoiba
- Suburb
- Interactive map of Quoiba
- Coordinates: 41°12′14″S 146°20′38″E
- Country: Australia
- State: Tasmania
- Region: North-west and west
- City: Devonport
- LGA: City of Devonport

Government
  - State electorate: Braddon
  - Federal division: Braddon

Population
  - Total: 427 (SAL 2021)
- Postcode: 7310
Suburbs around Quoiba
Stony Rise	Miandetta	Miandetta
Tugrah	Quoiba	Mersey river
Eugenana	Spreyton	Spreyton

Quoiba is a rural residential locality in the local government area (LGA) of Devonport in the North-west and west LGA region of Tasmania, about 5 kilometres (3.1 mi) south of the town of Devonport. The 2021 census recorded a population of 427 for the state suburb of Quoiba. It is a residential and industrial suburb located on the south western side of the Mersey River.

The suburb contains an industrial area with cardboard manufacturers, a cannery, vegetable packaging site and livestock sale yards.

The Mersey Vale Memorial Park (1968 onwards) and Mersey Gardens Chapel are located in the suburb.

Horsehead creek runs through the suburb.

Kelcey Tier Green Belt lookout has views over Devonport.

== History ==
Quoiba was gazetted as a locality in 1962. The locality was previously known as Spreyton Station. The current name was first used about 1942. It is believed to be an Aboriginal word for "wombat".

Quoiba livestock records have been held since 1919.

The railway line from Devonport to nearby Spreyton closed in 1957 after the opening of the Station at Quoiba in 1956; previously Quoiba was a siding from 1942.

An Ovaltine factory was situated in Quoiba and the factory workers rode the train from 1942 from Devonport.

Vegetable processing facilities were built by Heinz in 1950; these were later taken over by Simplot in 1995.

== Geography ==
The waters of the Mersey River estuary form part of the eastern boundary. The Western railway line passes through from south-east to north-east.

== Road infrastructure ==
Route B19 (Stony Rise Road) runs through from north to south.
