= Paloona, Tasmania =

Paloona
- Town
- Coordinates: 41°15′47″S 146°16′04″E
- Country: Australia
- State: Tasmania
- Region: North-west and west
- LGA: Devonport, Kentish
- Location: 16 km (9.9 mi) SW of Devonport

Government
  - State electorate: Braddon, Lyons
  - Federal division: Braddon, Lyons

Population
  - Total: 84 (2021 census)
- Postcode: 7310
Localities around Paloona
Forthside	Forthside, Melrose	Melrose
Kindred	Paloona	Lower Barrington, Melrose
Lower Wilmot	Lower Barrington	Lower Barrington

Paloona is a rural locality in the local government areas of Devonport and Kentish in the North-west and west region of Tasmania. The locality is about 16 kilometres (9.9 mi) south-west of the town of Devonport. The 2021 census recorded a population of 84.

== History ==
Paloona was gazetted as a locality in 1965. The name is believed by some to be that of an Aboriginal man, but other meanings have been suggested. These include “waist” or “belly”.

== Geography ==
The Forth River forms part of the western boundary. Paloona Dam and Paloona Power Station are on this section of the river, and the body of water behind the dam is called Lake Paloona.

== Transport infrastructure ==
In September 1923 the Paloona railway line that branched off the Western line at Don was extenfded to Barrington, Tasmania. It was but cut back to Barrington on 17 August 1928 after little traffic eventuated.

The C144 route (Lake Paloona Road) enters from the south-west and follows the Forth River to the central west, where it exits. Route C145 (Lower Barrington Road) enters from the south-east and runs through to the north-east, where it exits.
