= Tugrah, Tasmania =

Tugrah
- Suburb
- Interactive map of Tugrah
- Coordinates: 41°12′34″S 146°18′35″E
- Country: Australia
- State: Tasmania
- Region: North-west and west
- City: Devonport
- LGA: City of Devonport
- Location: 4 km (2.5 mi) SW of Devonport

Government
  - State electorate: Braddon
  - Federal division: Braddon

Population
  - Total: 470 (SAL 2021)
- Postcode: 7310
Suburbs around Tugrah
Don	Stony Rise	Stony Rise
Don	Tugrah	Quioba
Forthside	Eugenana	Spreyton

Tugrah is a rural locality in the local government area (LGA) of Devonport in the North-west and west LGA region of Tasmania. The locality is about 4 kilometres (2.5 mi) south-west of the town of Devonport. The 2021 census recorded a population of 470 for the state suburb of Tugrah. It is a suburb of Devonport, Tasmania, located on the south western side of the city.

== History ==
Tugrah was gazetted as a locality in 1962. The name is believed to be an Aboriginal word meaning "to eat".

== Geography ==
The Don River forms part of the south-western boundary, before flowing through to the north-west, where it then forms the north-western boundary.

== Road infrastructure ==
National Route 1 (Bass Highway) passes to the north-east. From there, Tugrah Road provides access to the locality.
