= Paranaple Arts Centre =

Arts and cultural centre in Devonport, Tasmania

paranaple arts centre
- Interactive map of the paranaple arts centre area

General information
- Type: Arts centre
- Architectural style: Contemporary with adaptive reuse of Victorian civic buildings
- Location: 145 Rooke Street; Devonport, Tasmania, Australia
- Coordinates: 41°10′39″S 146°21′38″E
- Current tenants: Devonport Regional Gallery; Town Hall Theatre; Devonport Visitor Information Centre
- Completed: 2018
- Opened: November 2018
- Renovated: 2018 (adaptive reuse of 1899 Town Hall and 1902 Courthouse)
- Cost: $71.1 million (Stage 1 precinct total)
- Owner: Devonport City Council

Design and construction
- Architects: Birrelliart + Design + Architecture (regional gallery component); Lyons (precinct lead)
- Developer: Devonport City Council

Other information
- Seating capacity: 407 (Town Hall Theatre)

Website
- www.paranapleartscentre.com.au

The paranaple arts centre (or simply PAC) is a multi-venue arts and cultural facility located in the central business district of Devonport, Tasmania. Opened in November 2018, the centre serves as the combined home for the Devonport Regional Gallery, the Town Hall Theatre, and the Devonport Visitor Information Centre.

The development is part of Stage 1 of Devonport’s greater $250 million Living City urban renewal project, representing the largest redevelopment of the city's civic and cultural infrastructure to date.

== History and precinct development ==
The Arts Centre is situated within the wider paranaple precinct, adjacent to the paranaple convention centre and Market Square. The site integrates contemporary architectural additions with two significant heritage structures: the former Devonport Town Hall (1899) and the former Courthouse (1902).

Masterplanned by Hames Sharley, the project was designed to improve physical and visual connections between the city’s retail core and the Mersey River foreshore. The Devonport Regional Gallery component of the building was specifically designed by Birrelliart + Design + Architecture.

== Naming and etymology ==
In official city branding, paranaple (pronounced /pærəˈnɑːplə/) is identified as the local punnilerpanner language word for "gathering place," situated by the mouth of a river. The name was selected for the precinct to reflect the site's historical significance as a meeting point and to anchor the Living City project in the region's Indigenous heritage.

Linguistic records indicate that paranaple is one of several recorded Aboriginal names for the Mersey River, with historical variants including pirinapel (recorded by McGeary) and ponrabbel (recorded by Joseph Milligan). The specific version paranaple was documented by the Danish adventurer Jørgen Jørgensen.

The lowercase "p" in paranaple reflects the original orthographic standards of palawa kani at the time of the centre's establishment in 2018, which favoured all-lowercase text to distinguish the revived language from English conventions. However, in late 2024, the Tasmanian Aboriginal Centre and the Tasmanian Government updated these standards to adopt initial capital letters for gazetted place names (e.g., Lutruwita and Kunanyi) to reflect the evolution of the language in the community.

== Facilities ==
=== Town Hall Theatre ===
The Town Hall Theatre occupies the former Devonport Town Hall building, constructed in 1899 and opened in January 1900. The building replaced the earlier Giblin Memorial Hall, which had been destroyed by fire in the late nineteenth century.

Following the 2018 redevelopment, the space was converted into a modern proscenium arch theatre with raked seating for 407 patrons. It serves as Devonport's premier performing arts venue, hosting professional national tours alongside local community theatre and school productions. In 2023, the theatre underwent a $300,000 refurbishment to replace seating and upgrade internal amenities.

=== Devonport Regional Gallery ===
The Devonport Regional Gallery is the city's principal public art gallery. It traces its origins to The Little Gallery, established in 1966 by Jean Thomas as a private enterprise. The gallery was later operated by the council in a 1904 weatherboard building on Stewart Street before relocating to the paranaple Arts Centre in 2018.

The gallery features three exhibition spaces (Main, Little, and Upper) and a dedicated Creative Space workshop area. It maintains a permanent collection focused on contemporary Tasmanian art, craft, and design. Notable holdings include:

- The Robinson Collection of over 100,000 historical photographic negatives.
- The Kathleen Cocker and Owen Lade collections.
- Works by emerging and early-career Tasmanian artists.

The gallery is supported by a youth committee known as The DROOGS and the volunteer group, Friends of the Gallery.

=== Visitor Information Centre ===
The Devonport Visitor Information Centre is located within the main foyer. It provides regional tourism information and booking services for the Spirit of Tasmania and local attractions.

== Accessibility ==
The complex is designed for universal access, featuring step-free entry from Rooke Street and Market Square. Lift access is provided to all levels, including the Upper Gallery and the Theatre Bar, with accessible amenities located throughout the facility.
