= Stony Rise, Tasmania =

Stony Rise
- Suburb
- Interactive map of Stony Rise
- Coordinates: 41°11′20″S 146°19′35″E
- Country: Australia
- State: Tasmania
- Region: North-west and west
- City: Devonport
- LGA: City of Devonport

Government
  - State electorate: Braddon
  - Federal division: Braddon

Population
  - Total: 728 (SAL 2021)
- Postcode: 7310
Suburbs around Stony Rise
Don	Devonport	Devonport
Don	Stony Rise	Miandetta
Tugrah	Tugrah	Quoiba

Stony Rise is a rural residential locality in the local government area (LGA) of Devonport in the North-west and west LGA region of Tasmania, Australia. The locality is about 4 kilometres (2.5 mi) south of the town of Devonport. The 2021 census recorded a population of 728 for the state suburb of Stony Rise. It is primarily a residential suburb of Devonport.

There are a few businesses along the Bass highway and along Stony Rise Road.

There is a rifle range on Stony Rise Road.

== Geography ==
The Don River forms part of the western boundary. The Western railway line passes through from south-east to north-east.

== Road infrastructure ==
National Highway 1 (Bass Highway) runs through the north-west corner.
