= Spreyton, Tasmania =

Spreyton Devonport, Tasmania
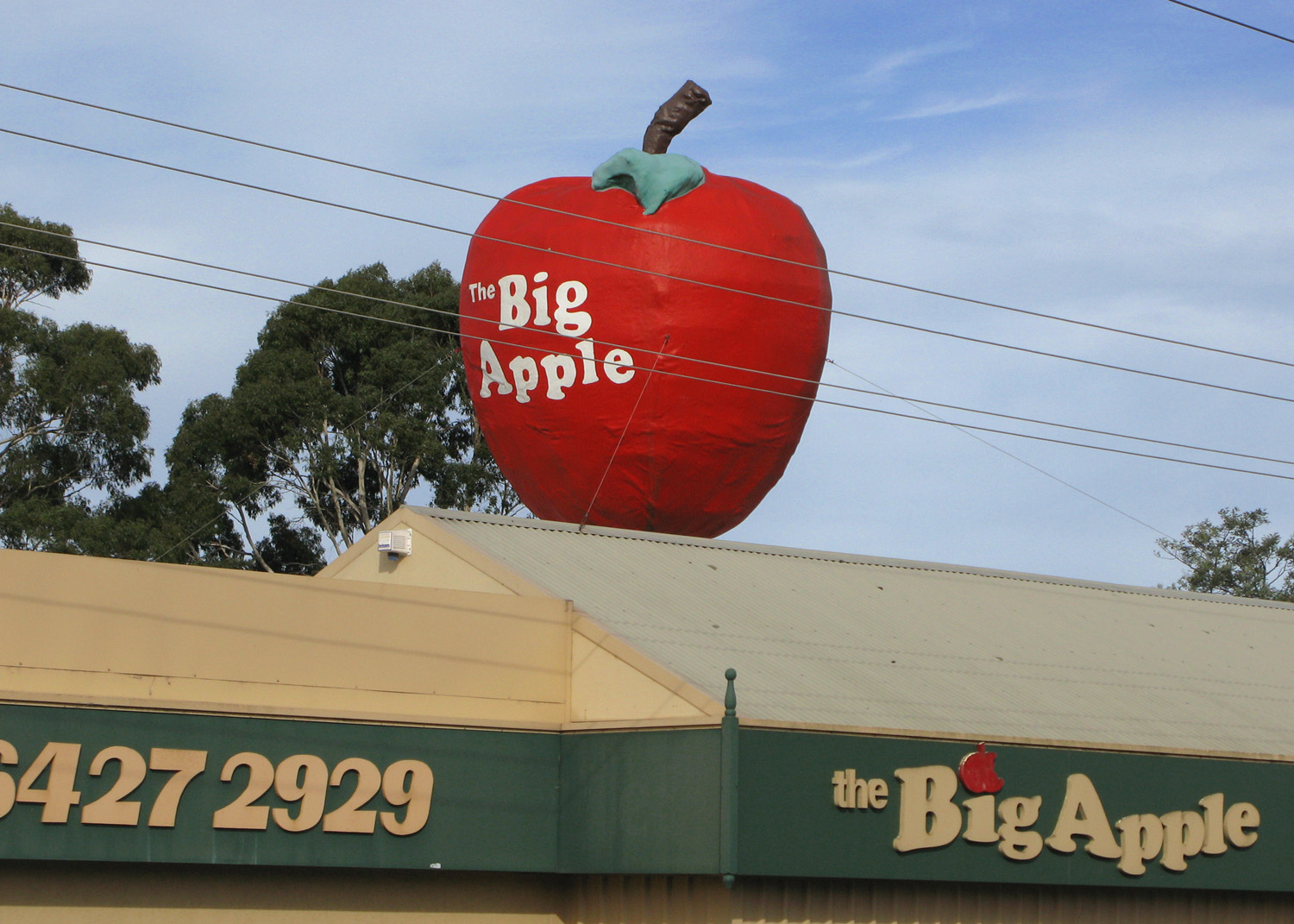
- The Big Apple

- Coordinates: 41°13′S 146°21′E
- Population: 1,876 (SAL 2021)
- Postcode(s): 7310
- Location: 253 km (157 mi) NW of Hobart; 98 km (61 mi) NW of Launceston; 7 km (4 mi) S of Devonport
- LGA(s): City of Devonport (75%), Latrobe Council (25%)
- State electorate(s): Braddon
- Federal division(s): Braddon
Suburbs around Spreyton:
Stony Rise	Quoiba	Mersey river
Tugrah	Spreyton	Mersey river
Eugenana

Spreyton is a locality, small town and suburb of Devonport, Tasmania, Australia. It is mainly in the City of Devonport area, but with just over 25% in the Latrobe Council LGA.

At the 2021 census, Spreyton had a population of 1,876. Spreyton is home to the fourth-generation family-run business Spreyton Fresh. Spreyton Fresh have had apple orchards in Spreyton since 1908 and in 1997 due to the downturn in juice apple prices have been producing a premium fresh apple juice.

Spreyton Post Office opened on 19 February 1883.

== Sports ==
The Devonport Cup a horse race is held annually in January at the Spreyton racecourse.

The Spreyton Football Club, an Australian Rules club, compete in the North Western Football Association. They play at Maidstone Park.

The Devonport Golf Club at Woodrising Golf Course has previously held the Tasmanian Open Golf Championships. The course was designed by Vern Morcom, who was also responsible for the Royal Hobart Golf Course.
