= Miandetta, Tasmania =

Miandetta Devonport, Tasmania
- Coordinates: 41°11′35″S 146°20′19″E
- Population: 1,822 (SAL 2021)
- Postcode(s): 7310
- LGA(s): City of Devonport
- State electorate(s): Braddon
- Federal division(s): Braddon
Suburbs around Miandetta:
Devonport	Devonport	Mersey river
Stony Rise	Miandetta	Mersey river
Stony Rise	Quioba	Mersey river

Miandetta is primarily a residential suburb of Devonport, Tasmania, Australia.

There are a few businesses on the shore of the Mersey river and along the Bass highway.

The petroleum silos used for import and distribution are on the banks of the Mersey River.

Part of the history of Devonport is the township of Appledore, this township still today has a railway sign post of that name and a street also by that name. Appledore is part of the suburb of Miandetta

Home Hill, the family residence of Enid and Joseph Lyons who was the tenth Prime Minister of Australia, (1932-1939) is located in the suburb.

The following reserves are located in the suburb Berkeley Court Reserve, Horsehead Creek Riverside Park, Mersey Lions Park, Miandetta Park and Wiena Park.

A fun park called 'Serendipity' existed in the area in 1988 for a short period of 18 months. This was closed and replaced with a mini golf course.

== Education ==
Miandetta Primary School is situated in Berrigan Road, Devonport, Tasmania.

Devonfield Enterprises is situated in Middle Road, Devonport, Tasmania.
