= Tasmanian Arboretum =

Botanical tree in Tasmania, Australia

The Tasmanian Arboretum
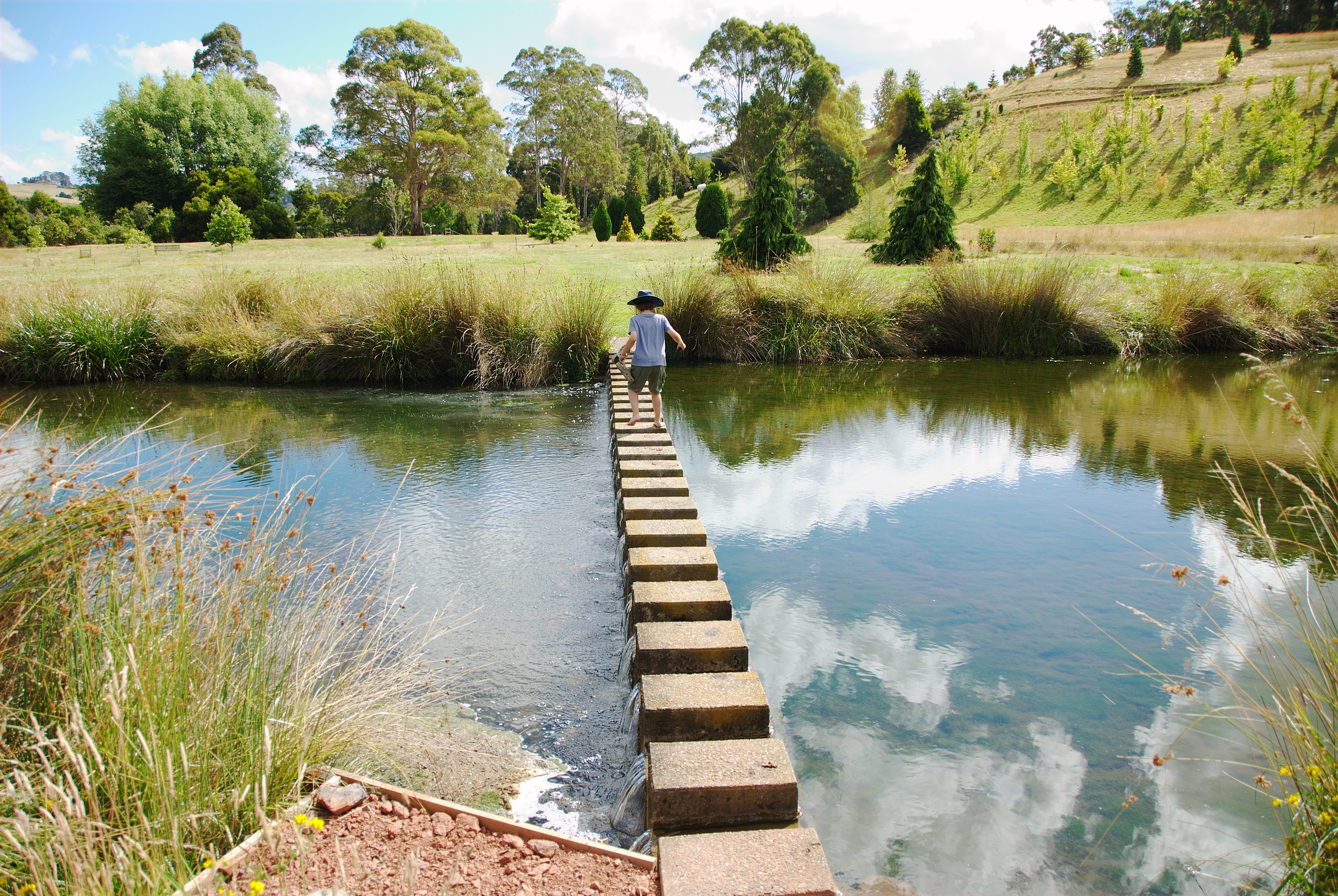
- Small boy crossing a weir in the Tasmanian Arboretum
- Interactive map of The Tasmanian Arboretum
- Type: arboretum
- Location: Devonport, Tasmania, Australia
- Coordinates: 41°13′46″S 146°17′59″E
- Area: 47 ha (120 acres)
- Created: 1984
- Website: http://www.tasmanianarboretum.org.au

The Tasmanian Arboretum is a botanical tree park (an arboretum) near Devonport, Tasmania, Australia.

== History ==
The arboretum was incorporated on 16 May 1984. The site originally consisted of 47ha of farmland and remnant forest which was purchased with Australian Bicentennial Grant funding. The first plantings of woody plants to add to the existing trees was in 1986.

11ha adjoining the main Eugenana site was given in 1996 by the then North Forest Products to help protect the landscape values of the sites location. In 2009 a further 7.9ha, consisting of a disused quarry floor and some cleared land surrounding the Eugenana State Reserve has been purchased.

Total area of the main site is 66ha with some 40ha for the collection and 22 of local natural vegetation. The balance is either quarry floor or infrastructure.

The original purchase was made with an Australian bi-centennial grant. Further development has been funded by many Tasmanian organizations and individuals as well as some from other States who supported the objectives.

== Current park features ==
The main site encompasses a section of the Don River where it adjoins Melrose Creek, surface limestone formations, old limestone quarries dating from circa 1860, associated tramway and railway formations and infrastructure associated with landscaping and managing a landscape arboretum.

There are over 4900 plants [1] in the geographic and thematic collections, besides the indigenous species natural to the site. Collections are mainly of temperate plants of the world. This includes the Tasmanian woody flora, the Southern Hemisphere conifers including Wollemia, the Genus Eucryphia and the cool temperate Nothofagus. Broadly, this represents a collection of the descendants of the flora of Gondwana.

About 80 species of birds have been recorded from the site including the swift parrot (Lathamus discolor) and the grey goshawk (Accipitifer novaehollandae).

The arboretum is open daily from 9 am to sunset. Entry fee is $10 per adult. Children under 18 are free. Annual membership is available, starting at $30 p.a. for singles. Family and corporate memberships are also available.

Activities include walking the tracks in a peaceful setting to view the plants, the wildlife, the art, the landscape and the limestone heritage. Dogs may be walked, but must always be on a leash.

Platypus may be seen on Founders' Lake. Wind generated waves may obscure the animal when it surfaces. Tasmanian native hens (Tribonyx mortierii) abound, and other birds may be observed.

The picnic area contains shelters with coin-operated barbecues and outdoor wood-fired ones.

Exhibitions and other activities are listed on the Facebook page.

== Organization ==
The organization, The Tasmanian Arboretum Inc., is an incorporated not for profit organization dedicated to operating a botanical institution for education, enjoyment of nature and research. It has a membership and is governed by an elected committee of up to 14. For taxation purposes the Tasmanian Arboretum is a Deductible Gift Recipient [2].

Maintenance of the collections is largely by the volunteers. Development has been funded by a range of donors. The Devonport City Council currently grants $20,000 per annum to assist with operations of the cultural attraction.
