= Leith, Tasmania =

Leith
- Town
- Coordinates: 41°9′28″S 146°15′34″E
- Country: Australia
- State: Tasmania
- Region: North-west and west
- LGA: Devonport, Central Coast
- Location: 10 km (6.2 mi) E of Ulverstone

Government
  - State electorate: Braddon
  - Federal division: Braddon

Population
  - Total: 504 (SAL 2021)
- Postcode: 7315
Localities around Leith
Bass Strait	Bass Strait	Bass Strait
Turners Beach	Leith	Lillico
Forth	Forth	Forth

Leith is a semi-rural locality in the local government areas (LGA) of Devonport and Central Coast in the North-west and west LGA region of Tasmania. The locality is about 10 kilometres (6.2 mi) east of the town of Ulverstone. The 2021 census recorded a population of 504 for the state suburb of Leith.

== History ==
Leith was gazetted as a locality in 1962.

Leith Post Office opened in 1890 and was closed in 1978.

Leith had a railway station in the early part of its history.

Leith is home to the oldest wishing well in Tasmania.

== Geography ==
The shore of Bass Strait forms the northern boundary, and the Forth River estuary is to the west.

== Road infrastructure ==
The Bass Highway (National Highway 1) passes through from north-east to west. Route C132 (Leith Road) starts at an intersection with Route 1 and runs south along the river until it exits. Route C189 (Braddons Lookout Road) starts at the same intersection with Route 1 and also runs south until it exits.
