= Steve Martin (Tasmanian politician) =

Australian politician

Councillor Steve Martin OAM

Councillor for the City of Devonport
- Incumbent
- Assumed office 25 October 2022
- In office 25 October 2011 – 9 March 2018

Senator for Tasmania
- In office 9 February 2018 – 30 June 2019
- Preceded by: Jacqui Lambie
- Succeeded by: Jacqui Lambie

Mayor of Devonport
- In office 25 October 2011 – 9 March 2018
- Preceded by: Lyn Laycock
- Succeeded by: Annette Rockliff

Personal details
- Born: Steven Leigh Martin; 3 October 1960 (age 66) Devonport, Tasmania, Australia
- Party: Nationals
- Other political affiliations: Jacqui Lambie Network (2016–2018)
- Spouse: Susanne
- Children: 2
- Website: www.aph.gov.au/Senators_and_Members/Parliamentarian?MPID=275266%2F

Steven Leigh Martin OAM (born 3 October 1960) is an Australian politician who was a Senator for Tasmania from February 2018 to June 2019, when he lost his seat at the 2019 federal election. Martin was declared elected to the Senate on a recount when Jacqui Lambie was caught up in the parliamentary eligibility crisis. He took his seat as an independent, before joining the National Party in May 2018 as its first Tasmanian member since the 1920s. He was previously the mayor of the City of Devonport from 2011 to 2018.

== Early life ==
Martin was born in Devonport, Tasmania. Prior to entering politics he was a newsagent operator and restaurateur.

== Local government career ==
In 2009, Martin was elected as an alderman to the Devonport City Council. He was also an unsuccessful candidate for Mersey in the Tasmanian Legislative Council elections. He was involved in the campaign to save the Mersey Community Hospital. Martin began his mayoral term in 2011, survived a non-binding motion of no confidence in 2013, and was re-elected to a four-year term as Mayor in 2014.

== Senate (2018–2019) ==
Martin ran as a Senate candidate for the newly formed Jacqui Lambie Network (JLN) in the 2016 federal election, second on the JLN ticket behind party founder and incumbent Senator Jacqui Lambie. The party won enough votes for Lambie to be reelected. However, she resigned in November 2017 during the parliamentary eligibility crisis after discovering that she held dual British-Australian citizenship and was thus ineligible under section 44 of the Constitution of Australia. Due to Lambie being found ineligible by the High Court, the High Court ordered a countback be conducted to fill the seat. After JLN votes above the line flowed to Martin, he was declared elected. Kate McCulloch, an unsuccessful Tasmanian Senate candidate at the 2016 federal election for One Nation, argued that Martin was also constitutionally ineligible because his mayoral role amounted to an "office of profit under the Crown", but the High Court of Australia rejected this challenge and confirmed Martin's eligibility on 6 February 2018.

Lambie expected Martin to immediately resign, which would have cleared the way for her to be appointed to fill the resulting casual vacancy and return to the Senate. She claimed that "personal morality" and loyalty dictated that Martin stand down. A party spokesman contended that Tasmanians intended for Lambie to hold the seat, and there was "an opportunity for that vote to be restored" if Martin resigned. When Martin refused to do so, Lambie expelled him later in the week. He resigned as Mayor of Devonport on 9 March 2018.

On 26 June 2018, Martin moved a motion calling for the AFL to commission business plans for the inclusion of a Tasmanian team in the men's and women's national league. At the time Senator Martin did so with the support of Coalition and Labor senators.

=== Joining the Nationals ===
Martin joined the Nationals on 28 May 2018. Martin became the first Tasmanian Nationals senator and the party's first Tasmanian member of parliament since Llewellyn Atkinson, who sat as a member of the then-Country Party in Wilmot (now Lyons) from 1921 to 1928 before returning to the Nationalists. Martin wants to reestablish a Nationals branch in Tasmania, where the party has historically not done well; it has only existed sporadically since Federation. He stood for re-election at the 2019 federal election, with The Sydney Morning Herald reporting that the Nationals are "throwing a modest level of resources behind his bid". He was not successful, polling just over one percent of the statewide Senate vote.

Martin was later elected as a councillor in Devonport at the 2022 Tasmanian local elections, giving the party an elected representative for the first time since he lost re-election.
