= Edgell =

Edgell is both a surname and a given name. An edgel in Statistics is a direction at a landmark (see Mardia et al. 2004).

Notable people with the name Edgell include:

== Surname ==
- Beatrice Edgell (1871–1948), British psychologist
- George Harold Edgell (1887–1954), American architectural and fine arts historian
- John Augustine Edgell (1880–1962), Royal Navy Officer and Hydrographer of the Navy
- Kizzy Edgell (born 2002), British actor
- Larry J. Edgell (1946–2025), American politician
- Zee Edgell (1940–2020), Belizean-born American writer
- Robert Gordon Edgell (1866–1948)

== Given name ==
- Edgell Rickword (poet, critic, journalist) (1898–1982)

== Places ==
- Edgell Island, Nunavut, Canada

== Company ==
- A brand of frozen vegetable and food products owned by Simplot
- See also Edgell, as in Edge detection
