= Ambleside, Tasmania =

Ambleside Devonport, Tasmania
- Coordinates: 41°11′52″S 146°22′3″E
- Population: 695 (2021 census)
- Postcode(s): 7310
- LGA(s): City of Devonport
- State electorate(s): Braddon
- Federal division(s): Braddon
Suburbs around Ambleside:
Mersey River	East Devonport	East Devonport
Mersey River	Ambleside
Mersey River	Mersey River

Ambleside is a residential suburb of Devonport, Tasmania, Australia located on the south eastern side of the Mersey River.

The suburb rises from the river to a hill with a sunny aspect.

The suburb is to the left on the eastern entrance to the city, before the Victoria Bridge.

The soil is a rich red in colour.
