= Bass Highway =

Bass Highway may refer to the following roads:

- Bass Highway (Victoria)
- Bass Highway, Tasmania
