= City of Devonport =

Devonport City Council
- Local government area
- Interactive map of Devonport City Council
- Coordinates: 41.2078°S 146.3137°E
- Country: Australia
- State: Tasmania
- Region: Devonport and surrounds
- Established: 1 January 1907
- Council seat: Devonport

Government
  - Mayor: Alison Jarman
  - State electorate: Braddon
  - Federal division: Braddon

Area
  - Total: 111 km^{2} (43 sq mi)

Population
  - Total: 25,415 (2018)
  - Density: 229.0/km^{2} (593.0/sq mi)
- Website: Devonport City Council
LGAs around Devonport City Council
Bass Strait	Bass Strait	Bass Strait
Central Coast	Devonport City Council	Latrobe
Central Coast	Kentish	Latrobe

Devonport City Council (or City of Devonport) is a local government body located in the city and surrounds of Devonport in northern Tasmania. The Devonport local government area is classified as urban and has a population of 25,415, which also encompasses Lillico, Tugrah and part of Spreyton.

== History and attributes ==
The Devonport municipality was established on 1 January 1907, becoming a city council on 1 January 1981. Devonport was proclaimed a city by Charles, Prince of Wales on 21 April 1981, in a ceremony conducted on the Devonport Oval. The city motto is The City with Spirit, this gives reference to it being the home base for the passenger ferry ships Spirit of Tasmania I and Spirit of Tasmania II.

Devonport is classified as urban, regional and small (URS) under the Australian Classification of Local Governments.

== Council ==
=== Current composition ===
Name	Position	Party affiliation
Alison Jarman	Mayor / Councillor	Independent
Stacey Sheehan	Deputy Mayor / Councillor	Liberal
Gerard Enniss	Councillor	Independent
Peter Hollister	Councillor	Independent
Steve Martin	Councillor	Nationals
Alison Moore	Councillor	Independent
Leigh Murphy	Councillor	Liberal
Damien Viney	Councillor	Independent
Janene Wilczynski	Councillor	Independent

=== 2022 election results ===
2022 Tasmanian local elections: Devonport
Party	Candidate	Votes	%	±%
Independent National	Steve Martin (elected)	3,093	20.42	
Independent	Alison Jarman (elected)	2,461	16.25	
Independent Liberal	Leigh Murphy (elected)	1,548	10.22	
Independent	Gerard Enniss (elected)	1,503	9.92	
Independent	Damien Viney (elected)	1,203	7.94	
Independent Liberal	Stacey Sheehan (elected)	1,024	6.76	
Independent	Alison Moore (elected)	932	6.15	
Independent	Peter Hollister (elected)	885	5.84	
Independent	Janene Wilczynski (elected)	848	5.60	
Greens	Tammy Milne	673	4.44	
Greens	Petra Wildren	532	3.51	
Independent	Kent Townsend	446	2.94	
Total formal votes		15,148	95.95	
Informal votes		640	4.05	
Turnout		15,788	79.62	
Party total votes
Independent		8,278	54.65	
Independent National		3,093	20.42	
Independent Liberal		2,572	16.98	
Greens		1,205	7.95	

== Suburbs ==
Suburb	Census population 2016	Reason
Aberdeen	229	
Ambleside	663	
Coles Beach		Incl. in Devonport
Devonport	13,759	Includes Coles Beach, Highfield, Hillcrest
Don	643	
East Devonport	4,053	Includes Pardoe Downs, Rannoch, Pannorama Heights
Eugenana	203	
Forthside	81	
Highfield		Incl. in Devonport
Hillcrest		Incl. in Devonport
Lillico	25	
Melrose	102	
Miandetta	1,852	
Pardoe Downs		Incl. in East Devonport
Pannorama Heights		Incl. in East Devonport
Quoiba	427	
Rannoch		Incl. in East Devonport
Spreyton	1,669	
Stony Rise	643	
Paloona		
Tugrah	366	
Total	24,715	
	(19)	Variance
Local government total	24,696	Gazetted Devonport local government area

=== Not in above List ===
- Leith

== See also ==
- Local government areas of Tasmania
