= SeaRoad =

Australian shipping company

- Type: Private
- Industry: Logistics
- Predecessor: Patrick Corporation
- Founded: 25 March 2007
- Founder: Chas Kelly
- Headquarters: Devonport, Tasmania, Australia
- Area served: Bass Strait; Tasmania
- Services: Shipping
- Number of employees: Circa 400
- Parent: Chas Kelly Group
- Website: searoad.net

SeaRoad is an Australian company specialising in sea freight and transport services. It primarily operates in the maritime sector, providing shipping operations between Devonport and Webb Dock, Melbourne. The company offers services such as freight transportation to support the movement of goods across the Sea Highway.

== History ==
SeaRoad commenced operations on 25 March 2007 after purchasng the Tasmanian operations of Patrick Corporation. As part of Toll Group's acquisition of Patrick, an undertaking was given to the Australian Competition & Consumer Commission to divest itself of Patrick's Bass Strait and Tasmanian operations.

In March 2022, SeaRoad launched a weekly service for Bass Island Line (BIL), linking King Island with the Australian mainland. This service, using the Searoad Mersey II and Liekut, replaced BIL’s previous Victorian port call.

In July 2023, SeaRoad opened a warehouse in Kings Meadows.

SeaRoad currently operates a six days a week service in each direction between Devonport and Webb Dock, Melbourne.

== Fleet ==
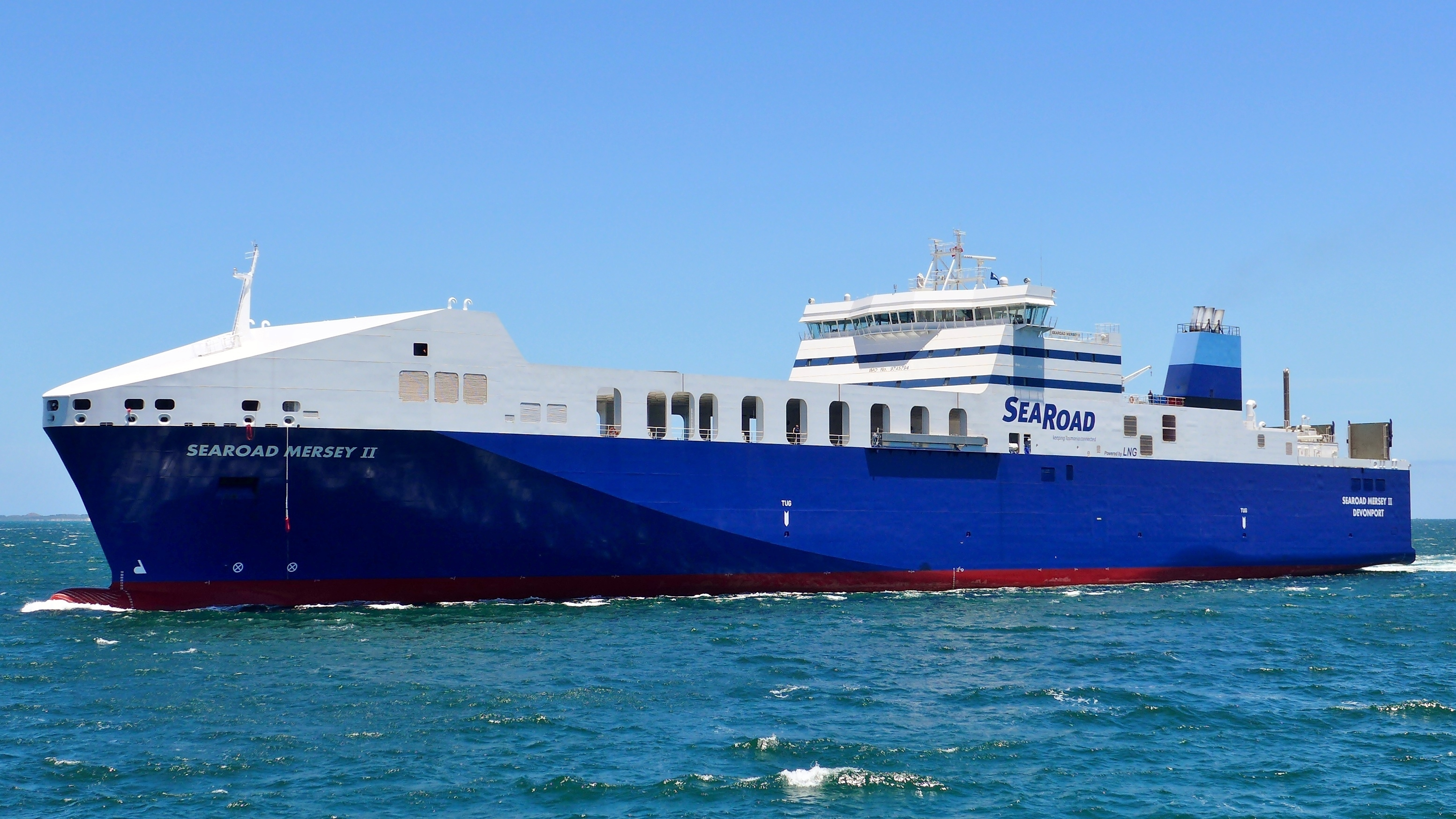
Searoad Mersey II on its delivery voyage in Fremantle in December 2016

SeaRoad commenced operations with the Searoad Mersey and Searoad Tamar that were included with the acquisition of the business from Patrick Corporation in March 2007.

The Searoad Mersey II built by Flensburger Schiffbau-Gesellschaft, Germany was delivered in 2016. In May 2017, Searoad Mersey was sold to Baja Ferries, Mexico as the Balandra Star.

The Liekut was bareboat chartered in 2021 to replace the Searoad Tamar that was sold to Bangladesh for scrapping.

In September 2021, the SeaRoad I, was ordered from Flensburger Schiffbau-Gesellschaft, Germany to replace the Liekut. Launched in November 2025, as at August 2026, it was undergoing sea trials off Germany.
