= Don, Tasmania =

Don Tasmania
- Coordinates: 41°10′39″S 146°19′17″E
- Population: 647 (SAL 2021)
- LGA(s): City of Devonport
- State electorate(s): Braddon
- Federal division(s): Braddon
Suburbs around Don:
Bass Strait	Bass Strait	Bass Strait
	Don	Devonport
	Tugrah	Stony Rise

Don (sometimes known as the Don) is a small village, located just outside Devonport Tasmania, situated on the Don River. It is home to the Don River Railway and the Don Village Market. Don also has a Presbyterian church.

The local Don Hall was used regularly to host ballroom dancing.

== Sports ==
The Devonport Rugby Club is a Rugby Union team competing in the Tasmanian Rugby Union Statewide League competes on the Don Oval.

The Don Cricket Club was established in 1871, and competes in the Mersey Valley Cricket Association.
