= Don River (Tasmania) =

River in Tasmania, Australia

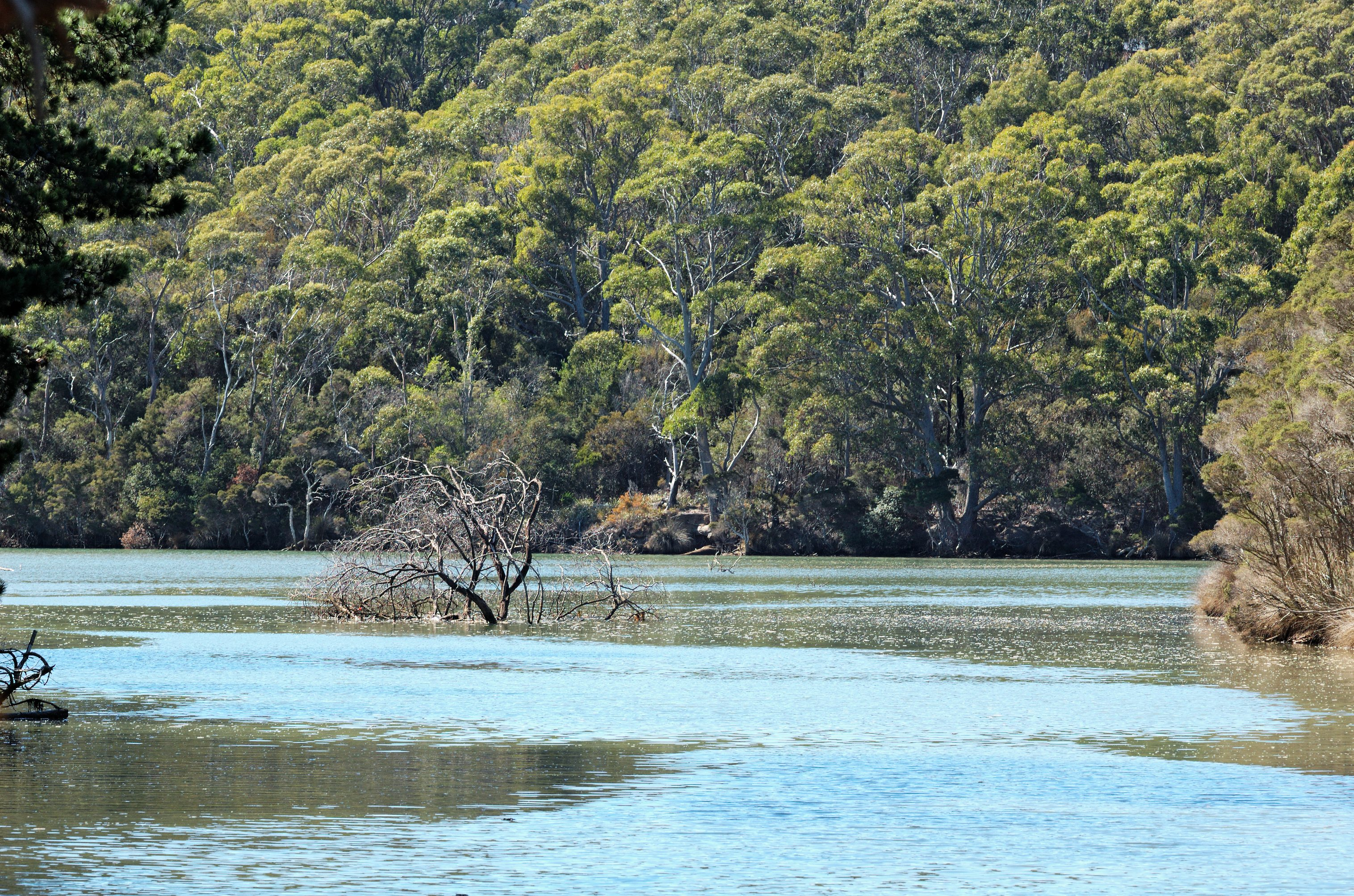

- Location of the Don River mouth in Tasmania

Location
- Country: Australia
- State: Tasmania
- Region: North-west

Physical characteristics
- Source: West Kentish locality
  - location: near Sheffield
  - coordinates: 41°24′17″S 146°15′15″E
  - elevation: 343 m (1,125 ft)
- Mouth: Bass Strait
  - location: Devonport / Don midpoint
  - coordinates: 41°09′37″S 146°20′05″E
  - elevation: 0 m (0 ft)
- Length: 37.8 km (23.5 mi)

The Don River is a perennial river for most of its length, located in the north-western region of Tasmania, Australia.

== Location and features ==
The river rises in West Kentish near Sheffield and flows generally north into Bass Strait at Devonport. The river descends 343 metres (1,125 ft) over its 37.8-kilometre (23.5 mi) course.

== See also ==
- List of rivers of Australia § Tasmania
