= Devonport, Tasmania =

Port city in Tasmania, Australia

Devonport Limilinaturi (Northern Tasmanian)
- City
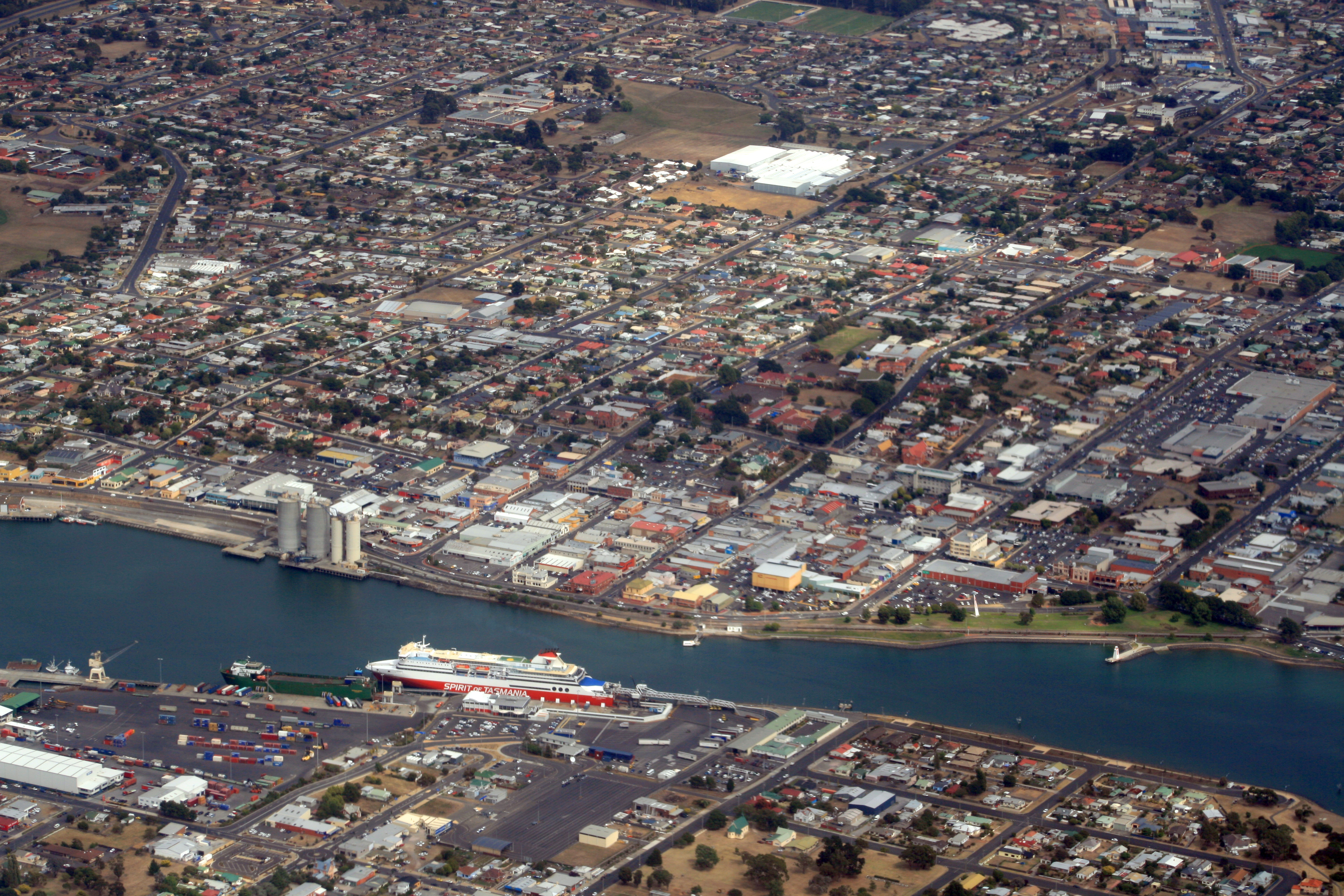
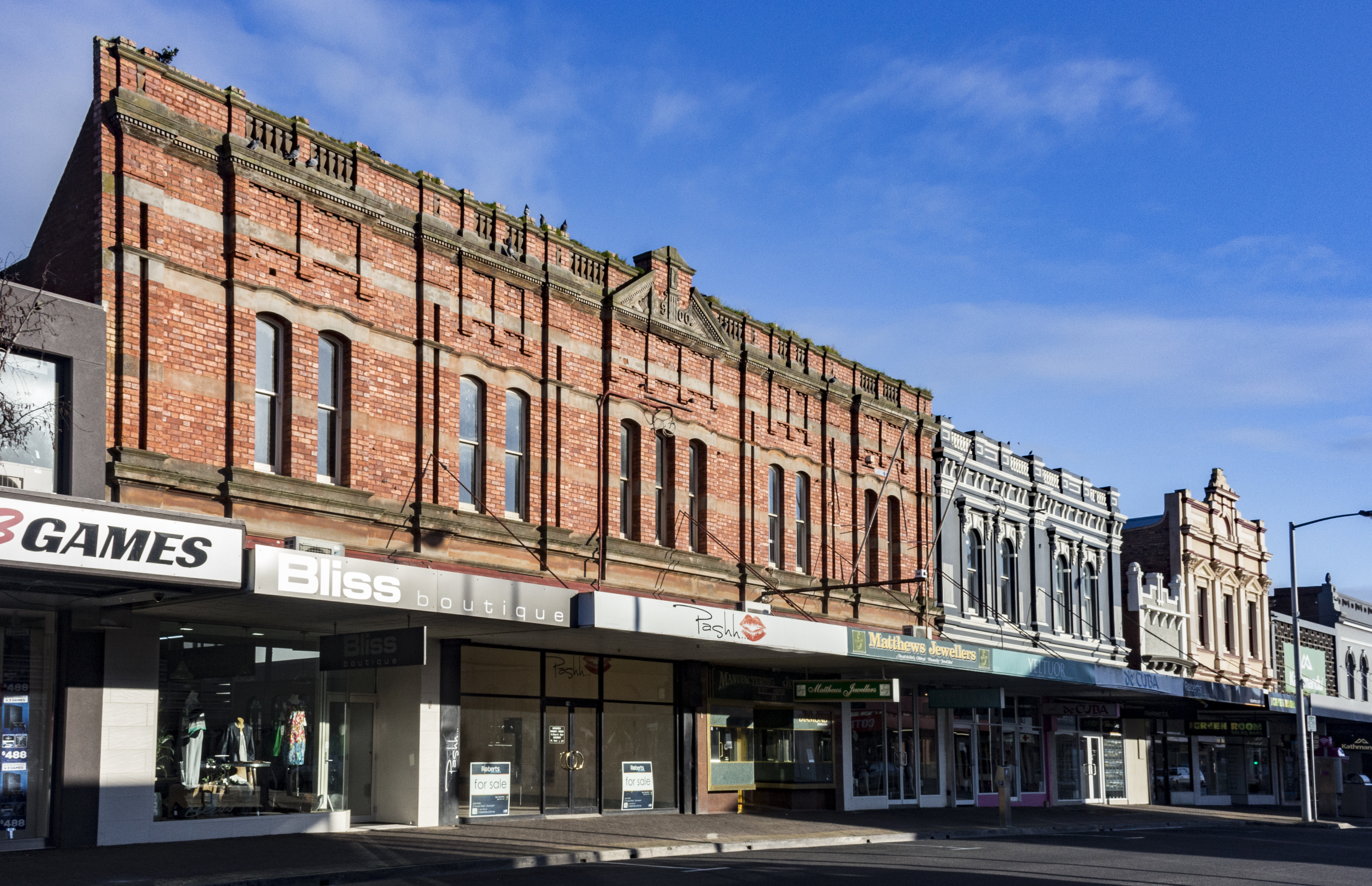
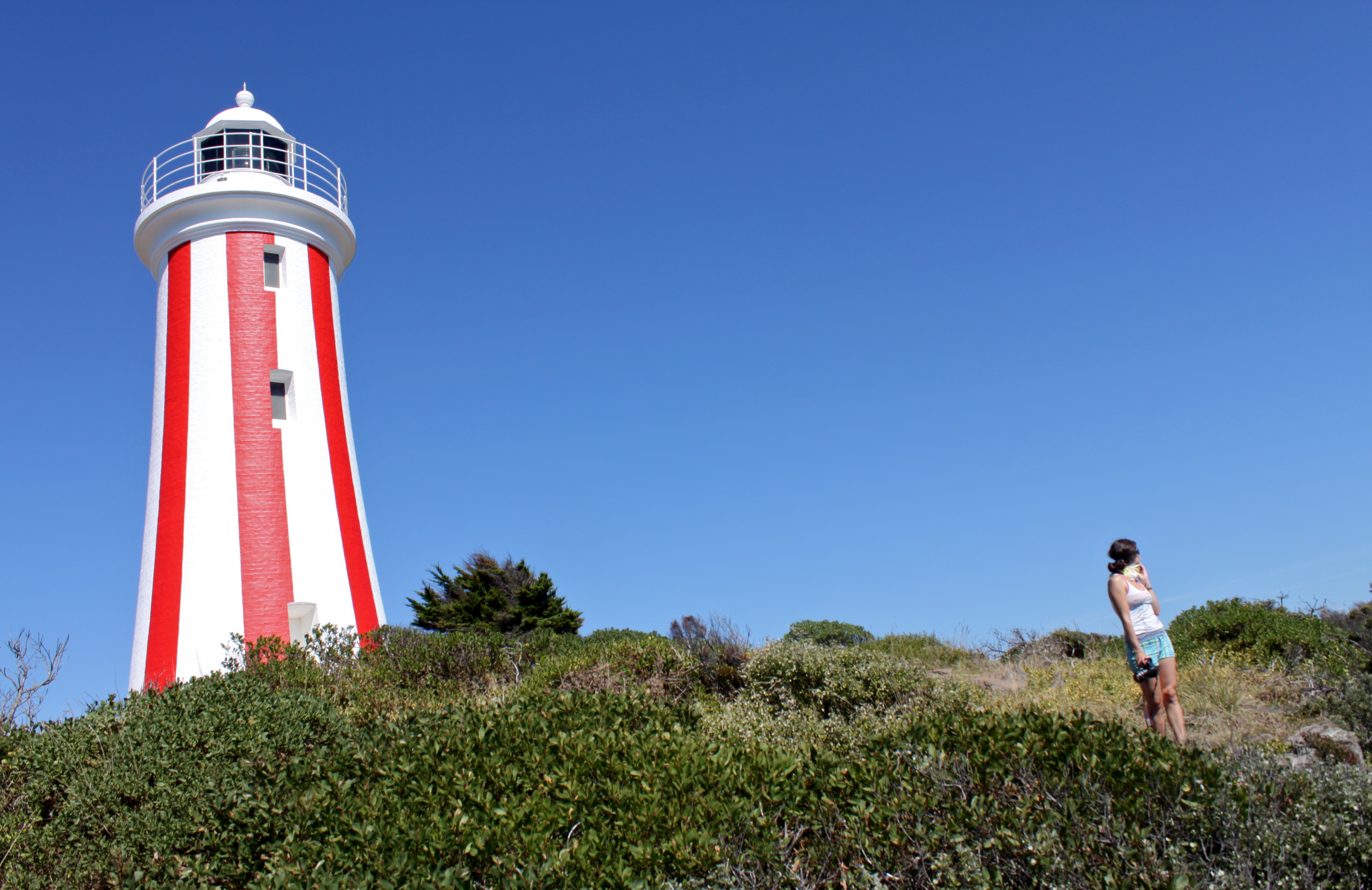
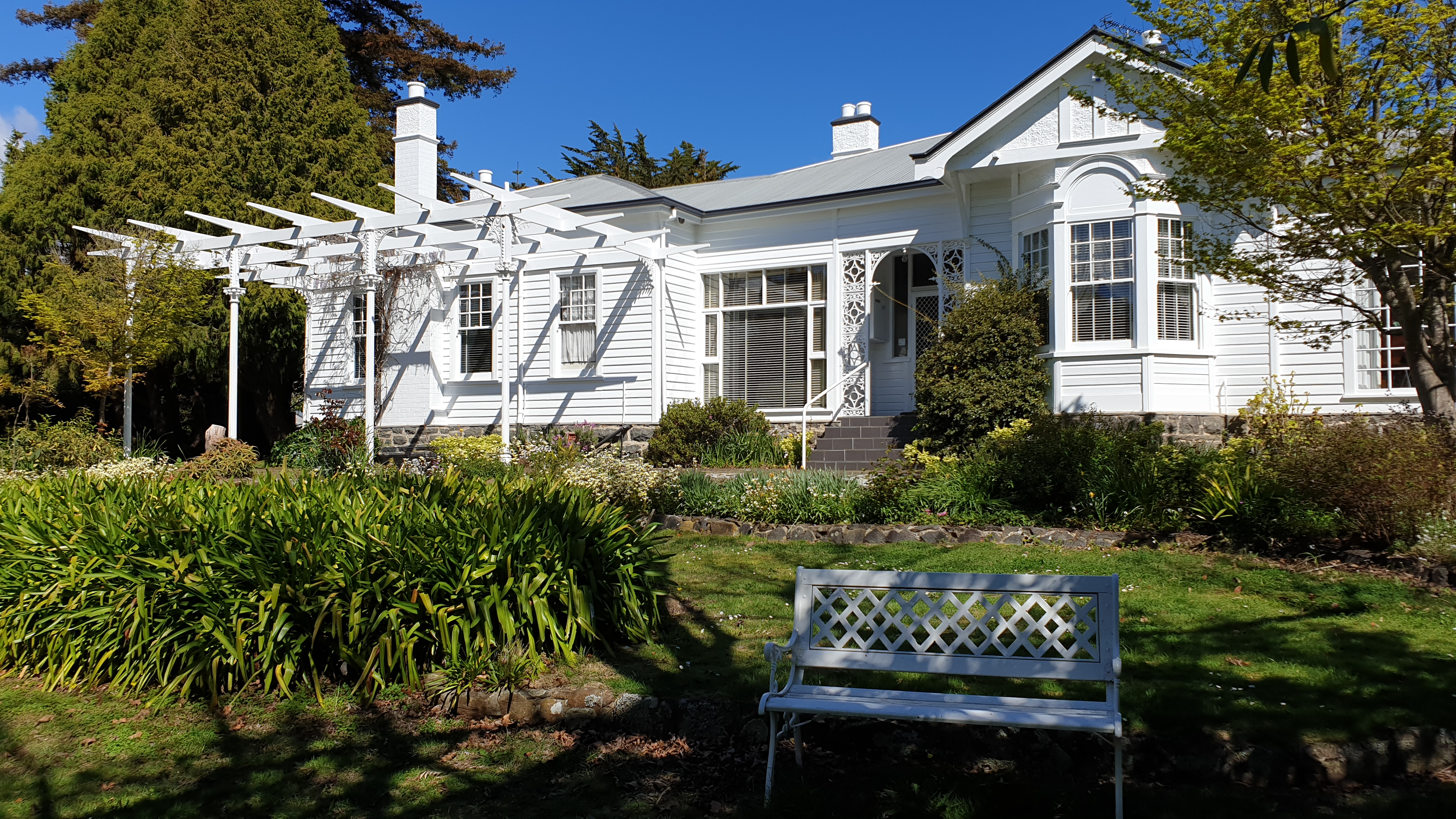
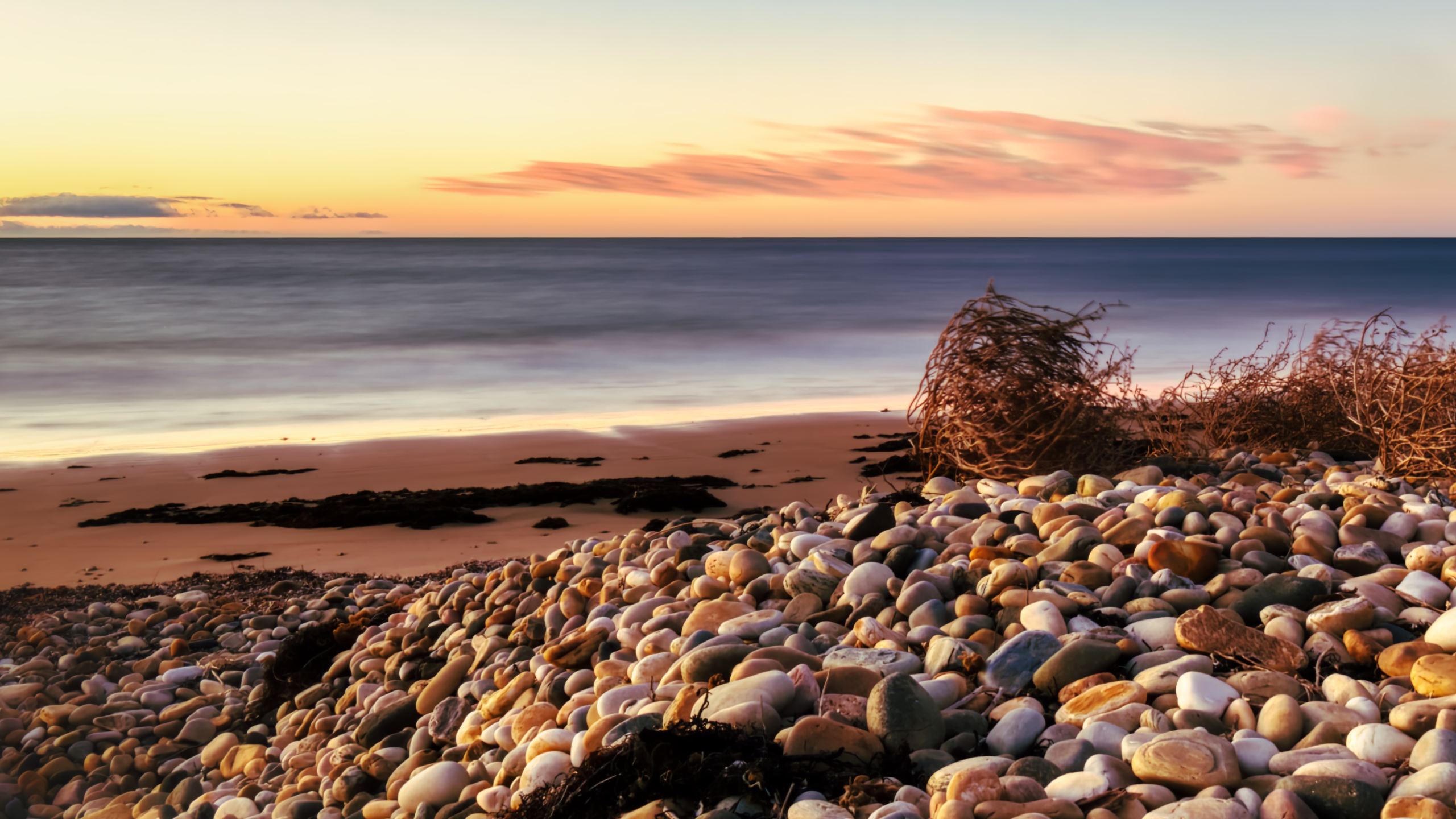
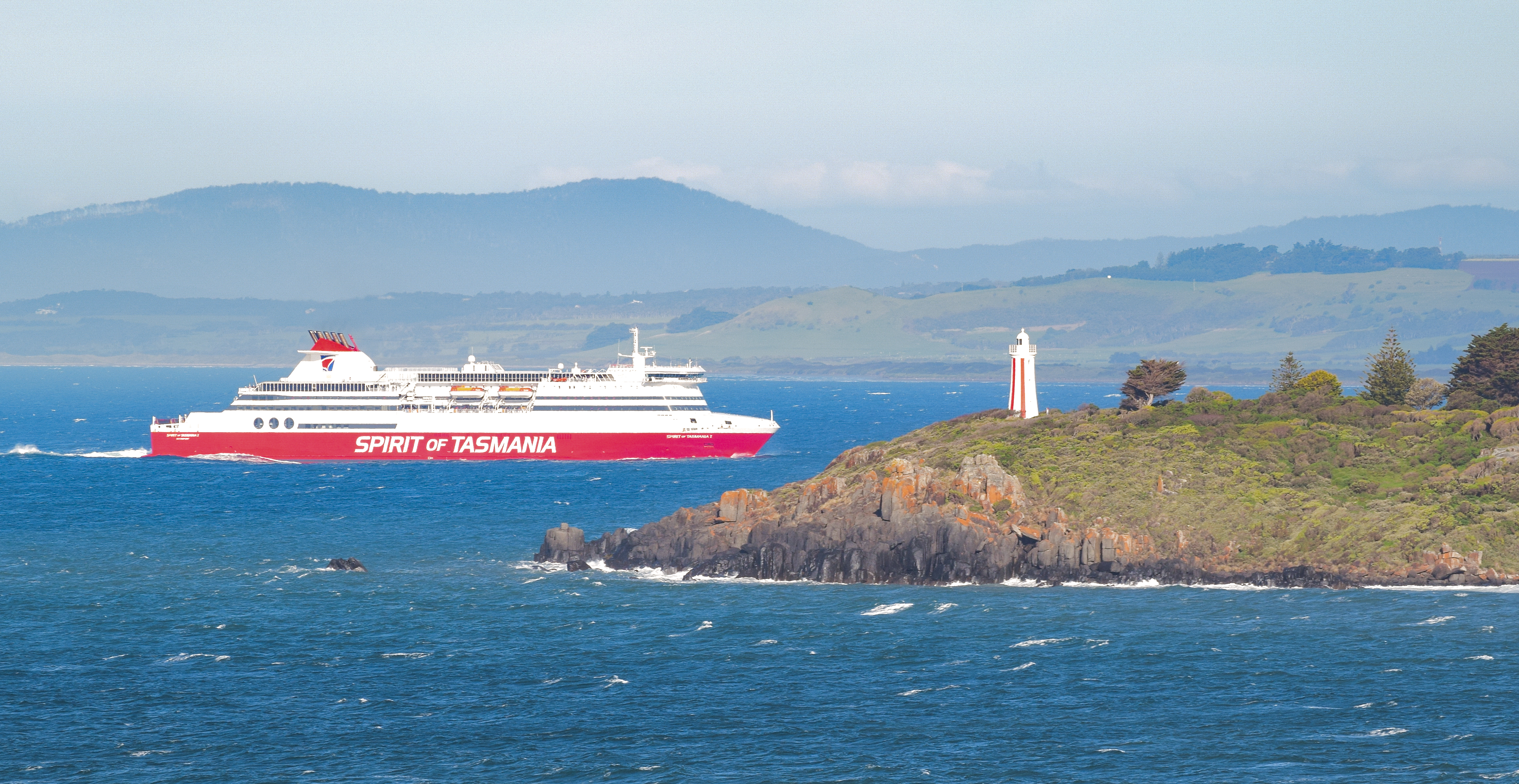
- From top; left to right: Devonport aerial, Rooke Street, Mersey Bluff Lighthouse, Home Hill estate, Heritage Walk Track, Spirit of Tasmania I

- Coordinates: 41°10′48″S 146°21′01″E
- Country: Australia
- State: Tasmania
- LGA: City of Devonport
- Location: 47 km (29 mi) from Burnie; 98 km (61 mi) from Launceston; 277 km (172 mi) from Hobart
- Established: 1850

Government
  - State electorate: Braddon
  - Federal division: Braddon
- Elevation: 9 m (30 ft)

Population
  - Total: 26,150 (2021) (46th)
- Time zone: UTC+10 (AEST)
  - Summer (DST): UTC+11 (AEDT)
- Postcode: 7310
- Mean max temp: 17.0 °C (62.6 °F)
- Mean min temp: 8.3 °C (46.9 °F)
- Annual rainfall: 773.0 mm (30.43 in)

Devonport (/ˈdɛvənpɔːrt/ DEV-ən-port; pirinilaplu/palawa kani: Limilinaturi) is a port city situated at the mouth of the Mersey River on the north-west coast of Tasmania, Australia. Positioned 47 kilometres (29 mi) east of Burnie and 98 kilometres (61 mi) north of Launceston, it is the busiest freight port on the island, managing over half Tasmania's imports and exports. Devonport's supporting industries include agriculture, manufacturing, and tourism. The City of Devonport's gross domestic product (GDP) was estimated at $3.5b in 2023.

Devonport's harbour is home to the Spirit of Tasmania's passenger terminal, facilitating roll-on/roll-off (RoRo) ferry operations connecting mainland Australia and Tasmania. In the 2022–23 fiscal year, the Port of Devonport welcomed over 450,000 passengers. The completion of the $240m Quaylink project is expected to increase this capacity by an additional 160,000 passengers annually.

Devonport was established in 1893 through the amalgamation of the 1850s settlements of Torquay on the east bank and Formby on the west bank of the Mersey River. The township became a municipality in 1907 and was designated a city by Prince Charles on 21 April 1981. With an urban population of 26,150 at the 2021 Australian census, Devonport is Tasmania's third-largest city, encompassing a total of 48,293 residents living within the greater statistical area.

Despite its relatively small size, Devonport has been foundational for many innovative industries that grew to be nationally-significant, such as the Finlayson family foundry, who engineered what is believed to be the first steam car in the Southern Hemisphere. Similarly, family members of shipping company Holyman & Sons established the first airline connecting Bass Strait in 1934 as Holyman Airways, which eventually evolved into Australian National Airways and subsequently merged with Ansett.

Devonport also holds a place in Australian political history as the home town of both Joseph Lyons, the tenth Prime Minister of Australia, and Dame Enid Lyons, the first woman elected to the House of Representatives and the first woman to serve in the federal cabinet. Dame Enid lived at their residence, "Home Hill" until her death in 1981, which has since become a popular tourist destination and is registered with the National Trust of Australia.

== History ==
=== Early inhabitants ===
The area now known as Devonport lies within the traditional country of several Palawa/Pakana (Tasmanian Aboriginal) groups associated with the North Nations. These included the Punnilerpanner of Panatana (Port Sorell), the Pallittorre of Lartitickitheker (Quamby Bluff), the Noeteeler of Ningherner or Parteenno (Hampshire Hills), and the Plairhekehillerplue of Emu Bluff.

The greater Devonport area is rich in indigenous resources such as birdlife, plant foods, and weaving materials. Seasonal activities included the harvesting of swan and duck eggs along the Mersey River in early spring.

British colonisation of northern Lutruwita (then known by Europeans as Van Diemen's Land) began in the 1820s with the expansion of the Van Diemen's Land Company and the granting of large pastoral estates (such as Northdown) placed pressure on indigenous populations through the disruption of river and valley corridors. By the twentieth century, no known direct descendants of the original inhabitants survived. Today, the broader Palawa/Pakana community maintains cultural and custodial responsibilities for the entire island.

=== European settlement before 1850 ===
Exploration of the Mersey River was undertaken in 1823, however initial observations by the British were unfavourable. Following the arrival of the Van Diemen's Land Company in 1826, the district underwent further exploration and surveying. Settlers commenced arriving later in the same year. Indigenous resistance to settlement was evident, leading to the killing of Captain Bartholomew Boyle Thomas on 31 August 1831.

The first European settlement in the Devonport region, predating 1850, was established on a block of land at Frogmore, near present-day Latrobe.

=== Arrival of settlers and economic growth (1850–1870s) ===
In 1850, the arrival of a settler named Oldaker marked the establishment of present-day Devonport. Saw milling and coal mining gained momentum with the arrival of English settlers aboard the sailing ship Balmoral in 1854. During the 1850s, twin settlements, Formby and Torquay, emerged on opposite banks at the mouth of the Mersey River. Torquay, the larger of the two, thrived with various amenities, including police, post offices, magistrate services, hotels, shipyards, and stores. A river ferry service connected Formby and Torquay.

Between 1870 and 1880, the shipping industry experienced growth, leading to efforts to deepen the mouth of the river. This development facilitated the commencement of regular steamer services between the Mersey and Melbourne.

=== Key developments (1880s–1900s) ===
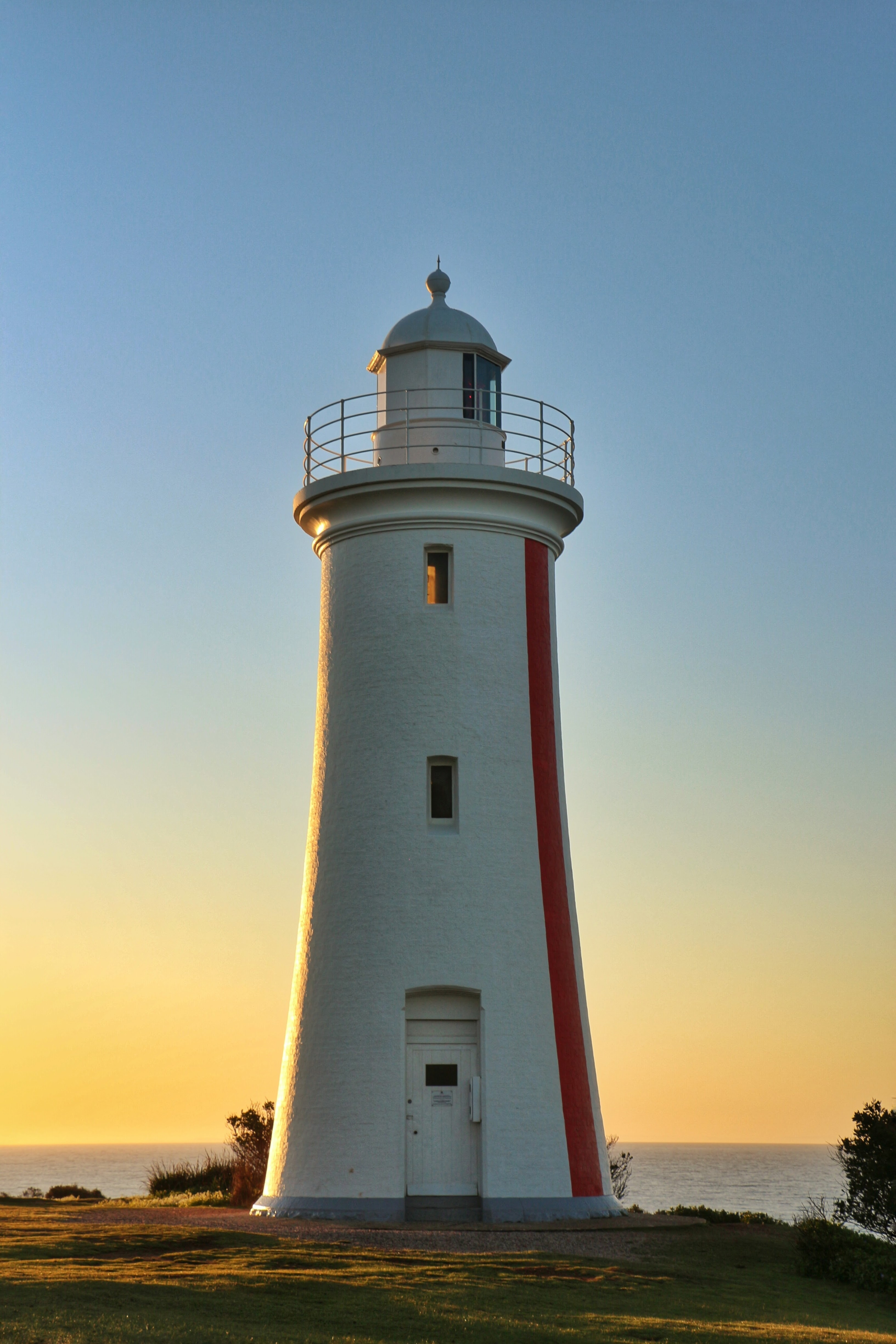
Mersey Bluff Lighthouse at sunset, 2015

In 1882, construction began on the Marine Board building, which remains a prominent landmark in the city. The completion of the Mersey Bluff Lighthouse in 1889 further improved maritime safety along the north-west coast. At the turn of the century, the arrival of the railway brought major changes to the Formby area, combining railhead and port facilities that spurred a period of rapid growth and building activity.

In 1890, a public vote unified the settlements of Torquay and Formby, officially creating the town of Devonport. The opening of the Victoria Bridge in 1902 provided the first permanent land transport connection between Devonport and East Devonport, significantly strengthening trade and communication across the River Mersey.

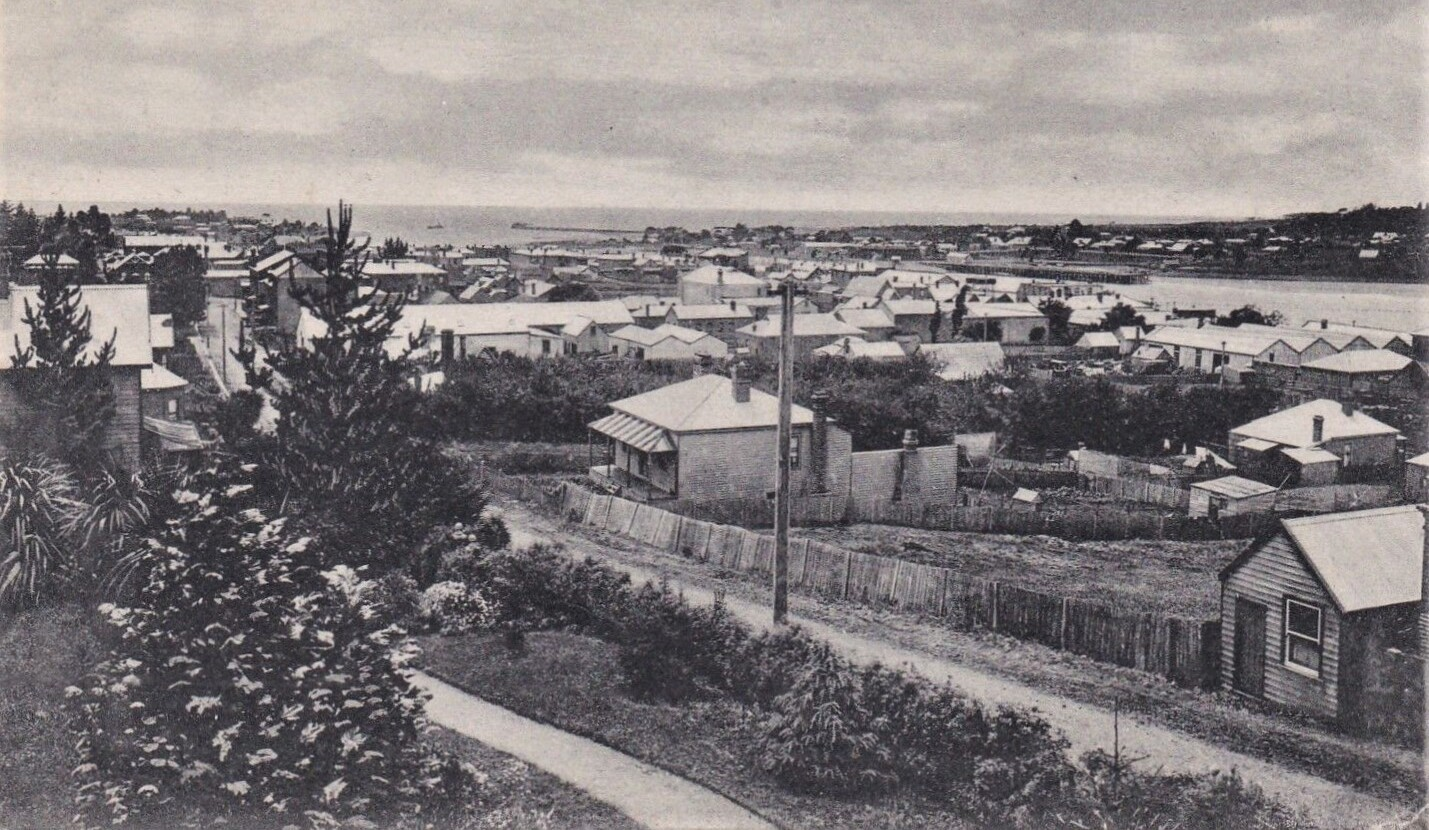
Central Devonport, 1908

Around this time, limestone deposits in the Melrose–Eugenana district became important to local industry. Quarries supplied material to BHP smelters, and in 1916 the government reconstructed the old Don Railway to transport limestone from Melrose to the Devonport wharves, supporting regional industrial development.

In 1924, the Victoria Bridge collapsed following damage caused by Teredo navalis. Although no injuries were reported, the bridge was subsequently rebuilt and reinforced.

==== Emergence of the Goliath-Portland Cement Company (1926) ====
Goliath Cement, now known as Cement Australia, traces its origins back to the Tasmanian Cement Company in 1923. Supercharged by abundant limestone deposits and Railton's proximity to shipping outlets, the company pioneered advancements such as the development of bulk cement transportation by sea and boasted the first fully automatic mill in Australia. The Railton facility, significant for its role in supplying cement for iconic projects like the Sydney Harbour Bridge, also produced asbestos products from 1947 to 1986, resulting in the company addressing compensation settlements to 3,000 workers who were exposed to asbestos in 2010.

=== Advancements in transportation and infrastructure (1930s–1950s) ===
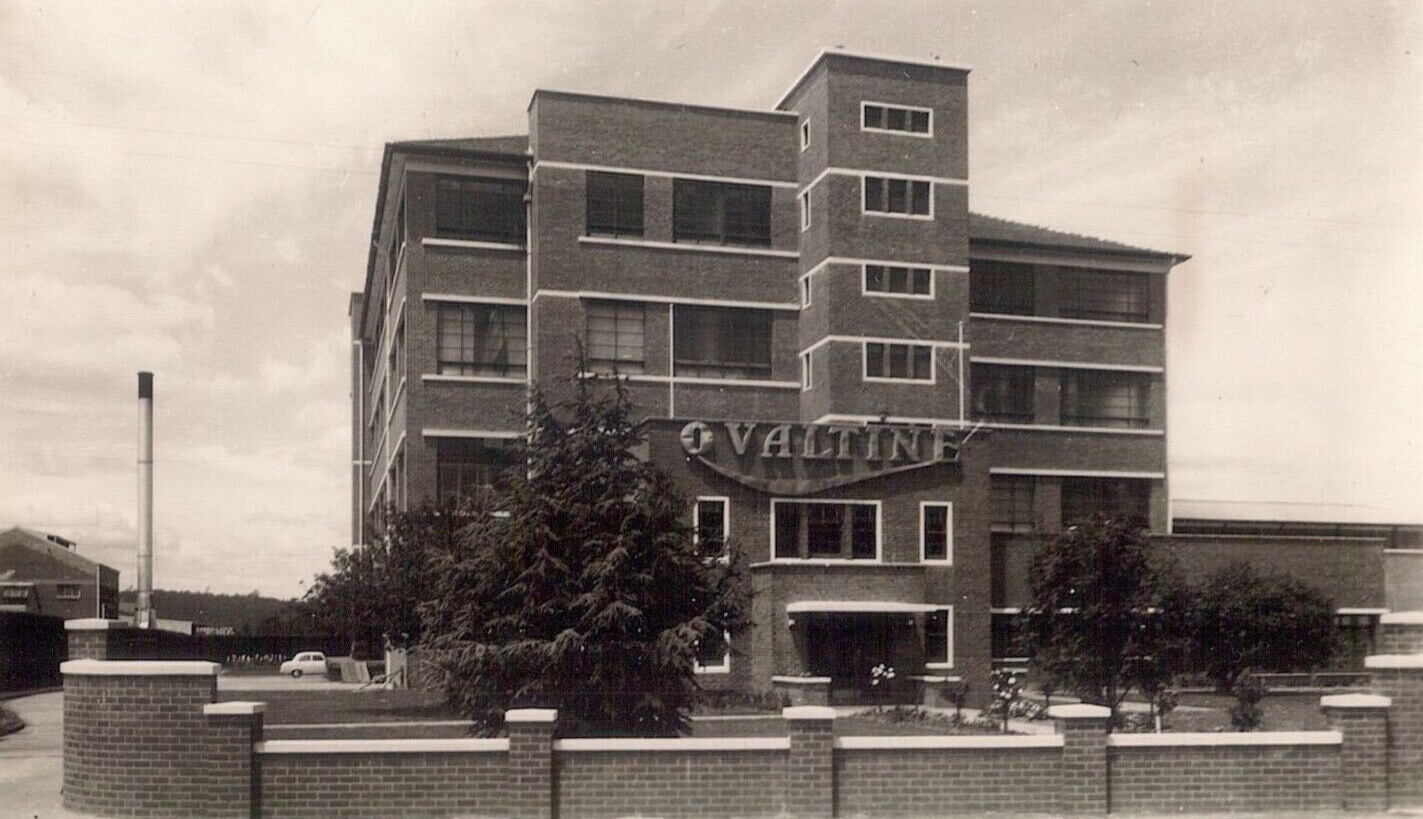
Ovaltine Factory, Quoiba, circa 1940s

Throughout the 1930s, Devonport saw advancements in transportation and infrastructure following the introduction of the motor car and modern roadworks. Street sealing projects were undertaken, main roads were upgraded, and the movement of goods became increasingly efficient across northern Tasmania. Constructed by Hansen Yuncken, the Ovaltine factory opened in 1943 at Quoiba, south of Devonport, becoming the company's second-largest manufacturing facility globally to meet demand across Australasia and Southeast Asia.

The post-war decades also saw the arrival of other major manufacturing enterprises. Tootal Broadhurst Lee established a weaving mill at Devonport in 1949, later expanding production through the 1950s. Known locally as “Tootals”, the factory was later operated by Australian Weaving Mills, producing textiles and towels for national distribution. In East Devonport, Tascot Templeton Carpets became a major carpet manufacturer, employing more than 150 workers until its closure in 2010.

In November 1952, the opening of the aerodrome at Pardoe marked a new era in regional air travel, with regular airline services linking Devonport to Victoria. Destined for Melbourne, the first freight aircraft departed carrying a 11,600 lb (5,300 kg) load of Ovaltine.

In 1955, Gordon Edgell & Sons purchased the former Heinz cannery at Quoiba, establishing a significant food-processing plant that later became one of Tasmania's largest processors of peas and other vegetables. The factory continues to operate under Simplot Australia, producing frozen vegetables for the Edgell and Birds Eye brands and remaining one of the city's largest employers.

=== Princess of Tasmania ferry service (1959) ===
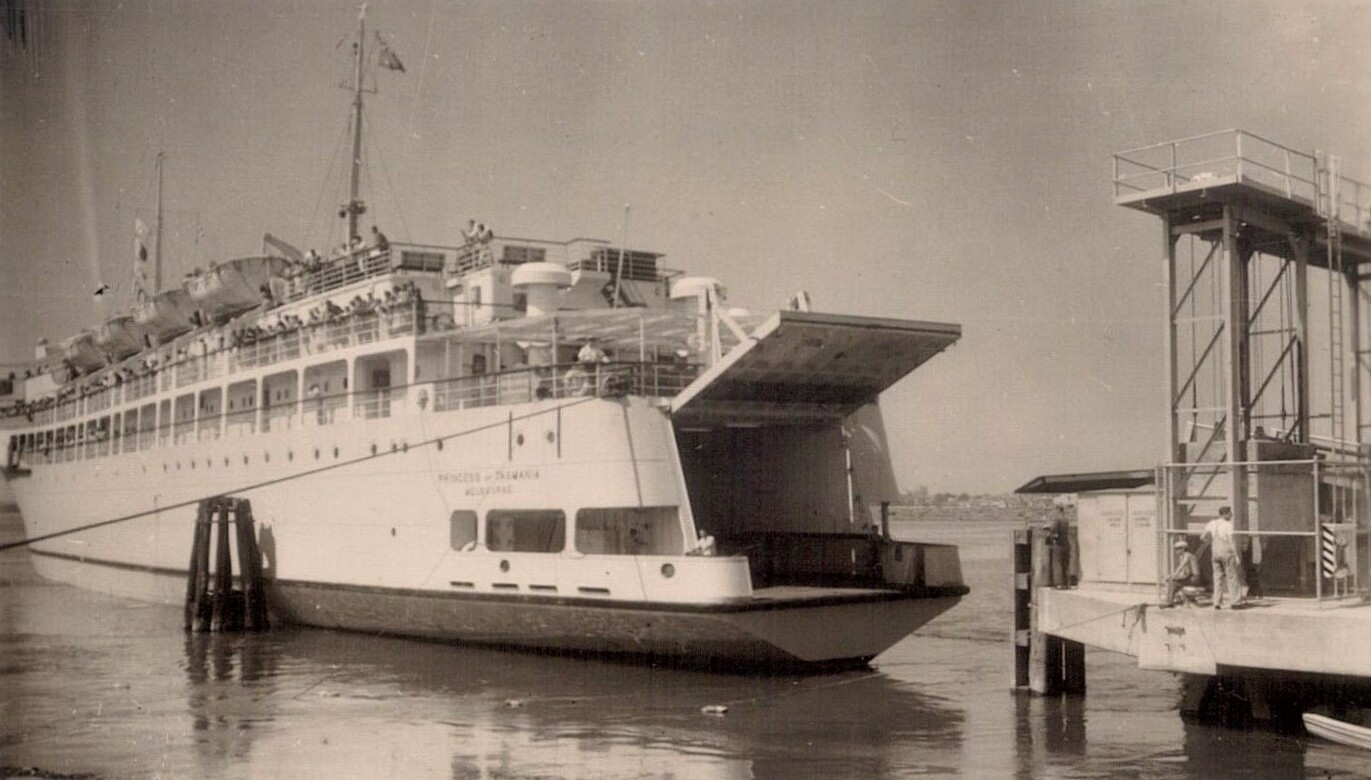
The Princess of Tasmania at Port Melbourne shortly after entering service

The roll-on/roll-off (RoRo) terminal, named the Sir Robert Cosgrove terminal, at East Devonport was officially opened on 26 September 1959 by the premier of Tasmania Eric Reece. In the same year, the Australian National Line ferry Princess of Tasmania entered service, establishing the first RoRo shipping link between Victoria and Tasmania across Bass Strait. Contemporary reporting described the service as converting the Bass Strait crossing into a “sea-road”, allowing motorists to remain with their vehicles for the duration of the voyage.

On its first 230 nmi (430 km) commercial voyage on 2 October 1959, the Princess of Tasmania carried 334 passengers. Accommodation included single, two and four-berth cabins for 178 passengers, with a further 156 passengers seated in three lounges fitted with reclining lounge chairs. The vessel could transport up to 100 vehicles, including freight vehicles and a Royal Mail van, and was crewed by approximately 60 staff members, some of whom had transferred from the Taroona.

The Princess of Tasmania operated on the Bass Strait route from 1959 until 1972 as part of the Australian National Line's SeaRoad service, before its replacement by later vessels purpose-built for increased passenger and vehicle capacity.

=== Urban expansion and industrial development (1950–1979) ===
Following the second world war, Devonport experienced sustained residential growth. New subdivisions were established westward across the Don Valley, northward toward Coles Beach, and southward along both banks of the Mersey River. By the late 1960s, the municipality was recorded as one of Tasmania's fastest-growing urban centres.

The regional economy was significantly altered by the construction of the Mersey–Forth Power Scheme between 1963 and 1973. Developed by the Hydro Electric Commission, the project involved seven dams and power stations utilizing the Mersey, Forth, Wilmot, and Fisher rivers. This infrastructure provided the hydro-electric capacity required for the expansion of energy-intensive manufacturing and food-processing industries in the Devonport area.

In June 1973, a prestressed concrete bridge was opened to replace the original Victoria Bridge. The new crossing improved traffic flow across the Mersey River and facilitated a direct link between the city and the Bass Highway.

=== City proclamation and modern developments (1981–2014) ===
Devonport achieved city status on 21 April 1981, proclaimed by Prince Charles in a ceremony held on the Devonport Oval.

From 1983-1984, the Devonport Warriors competed in the National Basketball League (NBL). The Warriors were forced to exit the NBL after the league announced it would be culled to 14 teams by 1985. The club never experienced financial hardship, and although the Warriors only won four games in 1984, ten of its losses had been by ten points or less.

Opening in 2001, the Pandemonium Discovery & Adventure was the North West Coast's largest indoor entertainment venue. Featuring an indoor play area, rock climbing, laser skirmish, skate ramp, and diverse science-focused exhibits, the centre catered to all ages, promoting health through active participation and recreation. The Imaginarium Science Centre located within the complex provided visitors with dynamic hands-on exhibits, programs, and changing displays. From 2001 until its closure in 2009, it hosted compelling traveling exhibitions from renowned science centers, such as 'Body in Action' from Te Manawa and 'Dinosaur Eggs and Babies' from Otago Museum and Gondwana Studios.

In 2014, after 160 years of continuous service, the cross-river ferry service was discontinued following the retirement of the Torquay ferry. However, it later resumed operations.

The town received national attention on 16 December 2021, when a jumping castle and two zorbs were lifted into the air by a gust of a wind at Hillcrest primary school, killing six children and injuring three.

== Demographics ==
Historical population
Year	Pop.	±%
1947	9,100	—
1954	11,829	+30.0%
1986	24,417	+106.4%
1991	24,622	+0.8%
2001	21,528	−12.6%
2006	22,315	+3.7%
2011	22,770	+2.0%
2016	23,044	+1.2%
2021	26,150	+13.5%
2023	26,997	+3.2%
Source: Australian Bureau of Statistics data.

In 2021, the population of Devonport was 26,150. External population demographics estimate the resident population for Devonport at 26,977 in 2023, with a population density of 242.8 people per square km across a land area of 111.1 km^{2} (42.9 sq mi). Devonport City Council has set specific population growth goals for the city, aiming to achieve a population of 30,000 by 2030 and 35,000 by 2040.

The median weekly household income is $1,167, compared to $1,746 nationally. 24.6% of households total weekly income is less than $650 week, while 10.4% of households weekly income exceeds $3,000. This compares to national rates of 16.5% and 24.3% respectively.

34.3% of households renting, and 8.1% of owned households with a mortgage experience housing stress, where rent or mortgage repayments payments exceed 30% of total income.

Devonport is home to a sizable First Nations population, with 1,971 residents, comprising 7.5% of the population, identifying as Indigenous Australians. This percentage surpasses the national average of 3.8% of the total Australian population. 83.6% of residents were born in Australia. 2.9% were born in England, 0.8% in India and New Zealand and 0.6% in each Nepal, Philippines and Mainland China.

89.9% of people spoke only English at home. 6.3% of households use a non-English language, including Mandarin (0.8%), Nepali (0.7%), Punjabi (0.4%) and Vietnamese and Tongan (0.3%).

In the 2021 census, 51.1% of people in Devonport professed no religion. 38.7% specified a Christian religious affiliation (including 12.4% as Anglicanism, 11.6% Catholic and 3.5% Uniting Church). Other religious affiliations include Hinduism (1.1%), Buddhism (0.9%), Islam (0.4%) and Sikhism (0.3%).

== Geography ==
=== Climate ===
Devonport experiences a mild oceanic climate with small annual temperature ranges, influenced by its coastal exposure and frequent westerly frontal systems. Summers are generally mild: from January to March average daytime maxima are around 20 to 22 °C (68 to 72 °F), with occasional warmer spells into the high-twenties and periodic cool changes when fronts pass.

Winters are cool and frequently cloudy, with regular light rain from passing fronts; July and August are typically the wettest months of the year. Daytime maxima in July average about 13 °C (55 °F) and nights are usually above freezing, while winter days rarely exceed about 15 °C (59 °F). Spring and early summer (September to December) are typically cool to mild and windy, with frequent showers interspersed with sunnier breaks as weather systems move across the north coast.

Climate data for Devonport Airport (means and rainfall 1991–2020, extremes 1991–present)
Month	Jan	Feb	Mar	Apr	May	Jun	Jul	Aug	Sep	Oct	Nov	Dec	Year
Record high °C (°F)	33.2 (91.8)	30.6 (87.1)	29.0 (84.2)	24.9 (76.8)	20.7 (69.3)	18.8 (65.8)	17.6 (63.7)	18.1 (64.6)	20.0 (68.0)	25.9 (78.6)	28.2 (82.8)	30.9 (87.6)	33.2 (91.8)
Mean daily maximum °C (°F)	21.6 (70.9)	21.8 (71.2)	20.5 (68.9)	17.8 (64.0)	15.4 (59.7)	13.5 (56.3)	12.8 (55.0)	13.1 (55.6)	14.3 (57.7)	16.0 (60.8)	18.0 (64.4)	19.8 (67.6)	17.0 (62.6)
Mean daily minimum °C (°F)	12.4 (54.3)	12.7 (54.9)	11.0 (51.8)	8.8 (47.8)	6.8 (44.2)	5.1 (41.2)	4.7 (40.5)	4.9 (40.8)	6.1 (43.0)	7.4 (45.3)	9.3 (48.7)	10.7 (51.3)	8.3 (46.9)
Record low °C (°F)	4.0 (39.2)	−1.2 (29.8)	−2.5 (27.5)	−0.8 (30.6)	−1.8 (28.8)	−1.9 (28.6)	−2.2 (28.0)	−4.8 (23.4)	−2.0 (28.4)	−2.3 (27.9)	0.6 (33.1)	1.6 (34.9)	−4.8 (23.4)
Average rainfall mm (inches)	48.0 (1.89)	35.3 (1.39)	42.8 (1.69)	56.8 (2.24)	64.4 (2.54)	71.8 (2.83)	86.3 (3.40)	81.5 (3.21)	76.8 (3.02)	55.2 (2.17)	57.1 (2.25)	47.4 (1.87)	723.4 (28.48)
Average rainy days (≥ 0.2 mm)	7.1	6.9	7.8	9.7	12.4	13.0	15.6	16.0	15.1	12.0	10.9	8.8	135.3
Average afternoon relative humidity (%)	61	61	59	62	66	68	69	68	66	63	65	61	64
Mean monthly sunshine hours	263.5	240.1	210.8	171.0	142.6	132.0	136.4	151.9	186.0	232.5	246.0	257.3	2,370.1
Source 1: Bureau of Meteorology
Source 2: Bureau of Meteorology (1981–1996 sunshine hours)

== Governance ==
Mayor of Devonport
- Incumbent; Alison Jarman since 28 October 2022
- Style: Councillor
- Member of: Devonport City Council
- Formation: 1908
- First holder: Kerry Berwick

There are nine councillors that govern the Devonport City Council. Alison Jarman was elected mayor of the City of Devonport in 2022. Jarman was re-elected with almost 65% of first preferences in 2026. Devonport City Council oversees local governance in Devonport, managing infrastructure, community services, and local regulations. The council is also involved in supporting community development initiatives, including the Devonport Entertainment and Convention Centre. Devonport's political landscape is marked by a blend of conservative and progressive influences, reflecting the region's broader social dynamics.

At the state level, Devonport falls within the Tasmanian House of Assembly’s electoral division of Braddon, a multi-member electorate that includes both Labor and Liberal members.

Nationally, Devonport is located in the federal electorate of Braddon, currently represented by Anne Urquhart of the Australian Labor Party. Braddon has traditionally been a marginal seat, with representation often alternating between the Labor and Liberal parties in federal elections.

== Suburbs ==
- Areas within Devonport as a suburb include Highfield
- Areas within East Devonport as a suburb includes Pardoe Downs, Rannoch, Panorama Heights

== Cultural and educational institutions ==
Interconnecting several of the city's historic cultural venues, the paranaple Arts Centre opened in November 2018. These include the Devonport Regional Gallery, the Town Hall Theatre, and the Devonport Visitor Information Centre. The complex contains exhibition spaces, a theatre, studios, rehearsal rooms and multipurpose areas used for performances, exhibitions and community events.

The Devonport Regional Gallery's permanent collection has its origins in works collected by Jean Thomas for The Little Gallery, which opened in 1966 and exhibited works by Tasmanian artists. The gallery's collection and programs generally focus on local arts, and also facilitates exhibitions, education and public events.

The Tiagarra Aboriginal Culture Centre and Museum at Mersey Bluff is an Aboriginal-owned cultural institution that operates as a keeping place for Tasmanian Aboriginal cultural material. Its exhibits include petroglyphs, rock designs and displays relating to traditional Palawa/Pakana life. The centre was officially opened on 16 October 1976 by Doug Nicholls and Gladys Nicholls.

The Bass Strait Maritime Centre is located in the former Harbour Master's House at East Devonport and focuses on the maritime history of Devonport, Bass Strait and northern Tasmania. The museum holds collections of artefacts, ship models, photographs and archival material relating to seafaring, shipwrecks and local maritime activity, and presents rotating exhibitions and educational programs.

A volunteer-operated heritage railway and museum, the Don River Railway, is located at Don, a suburb of Devonport. The railway preserves and operates historic rolling stock associated with Tasmania's rail transport history.

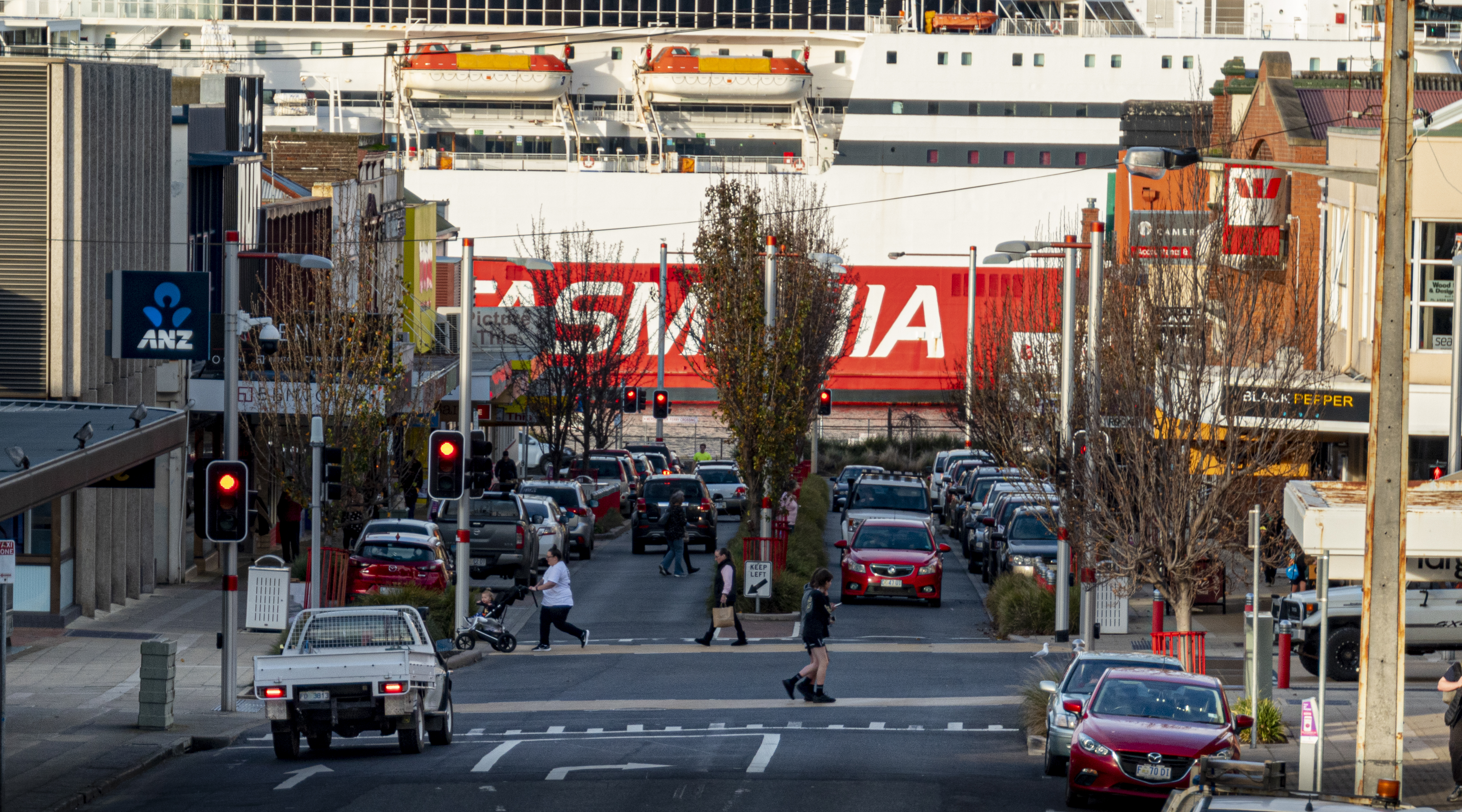
Downtown Devonport back dropped with Spirit of Tasmania I

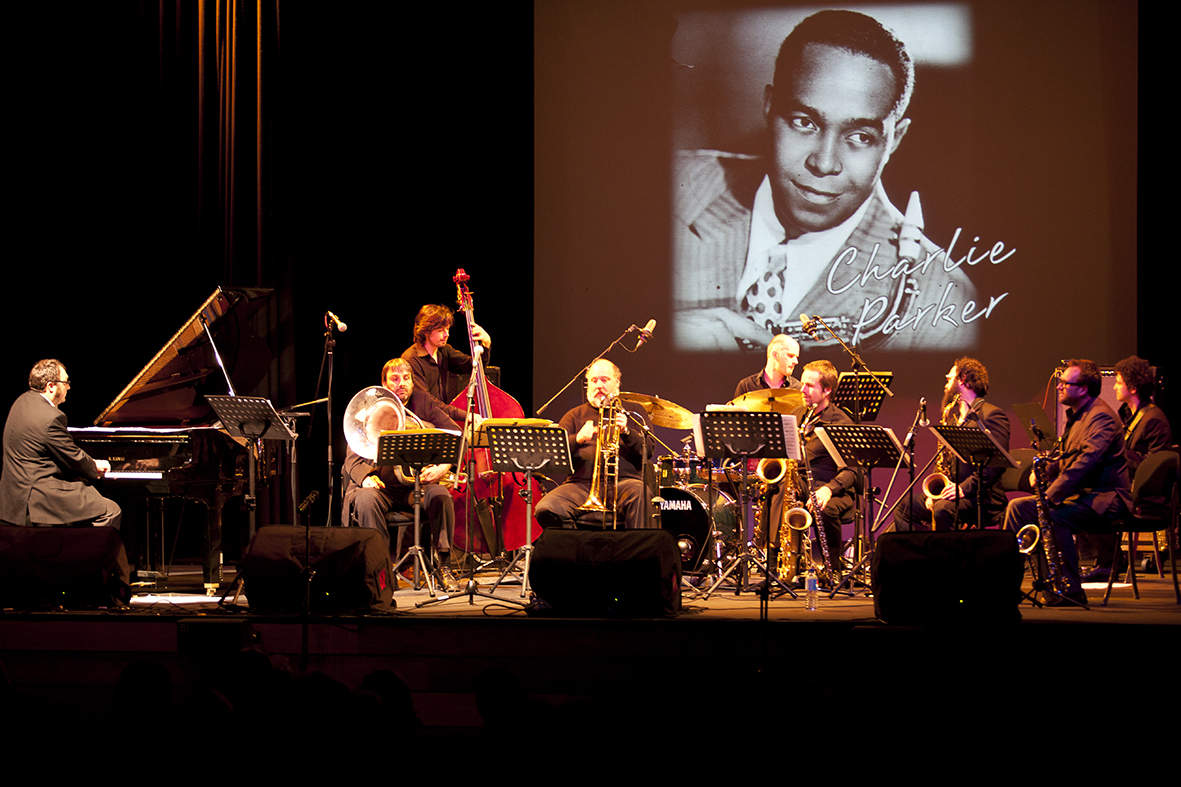
Town Hall Theatre, now located within the Paranaple Arts Centre

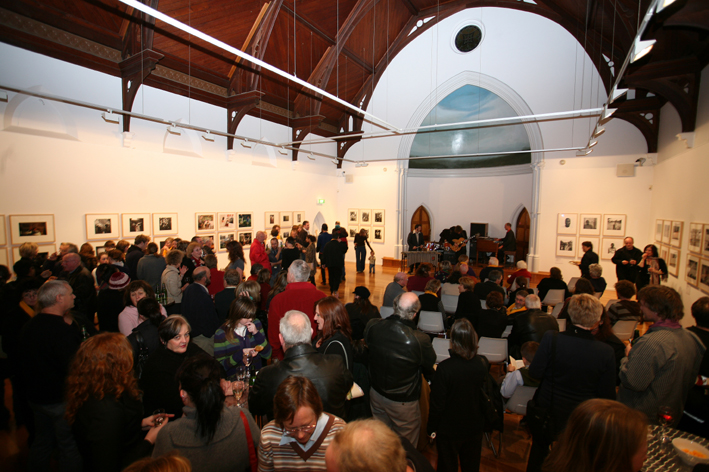
Devonport Regional Gallery, c. 2008

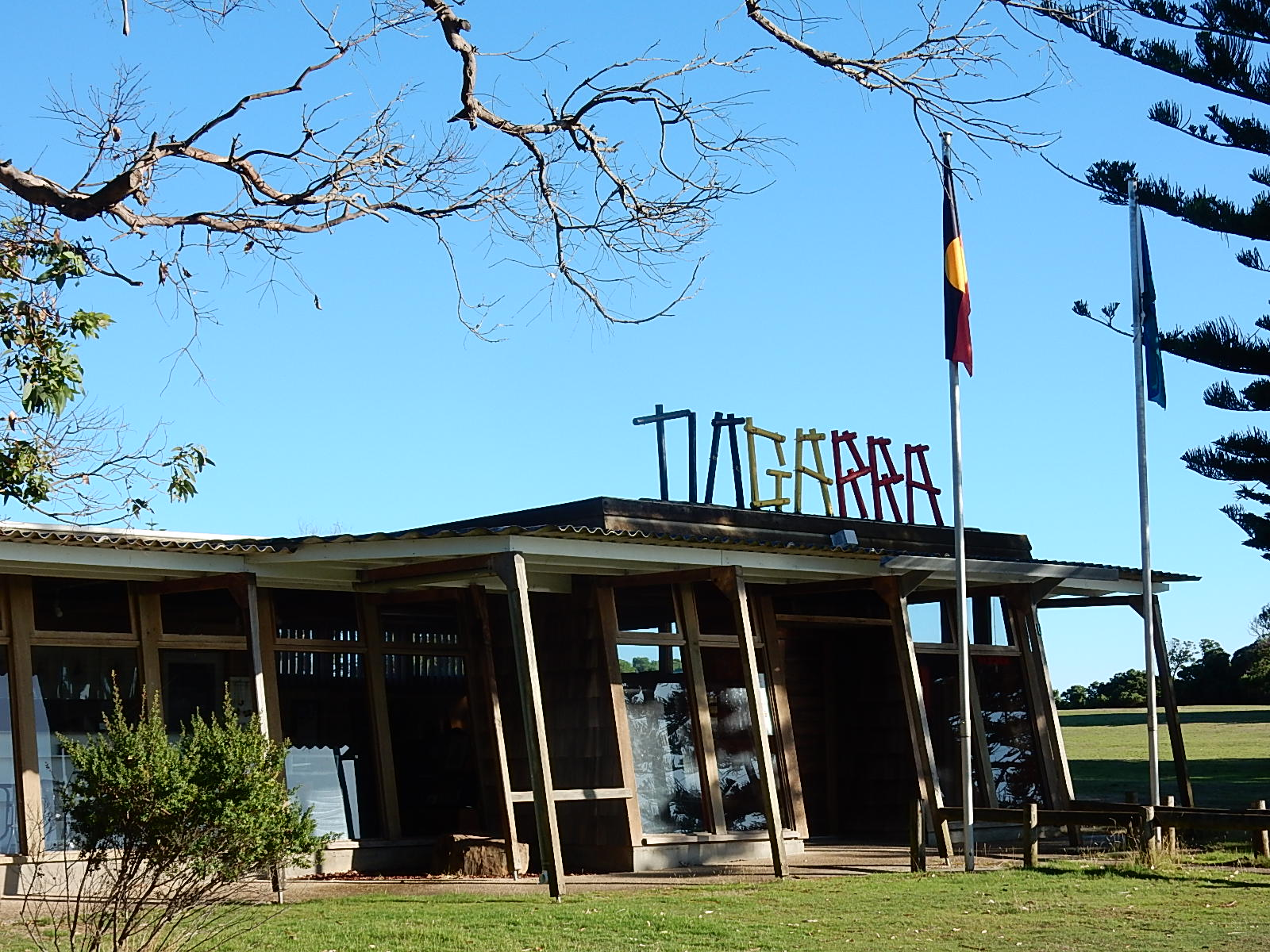
Tiagarra Aboriginal Culture Centre and Museum, c. 2016

== Transport ==
Devonport offers a range of transportation options, including road networks, intercity bus services, public transport bus services operated by Kinetic Tasmania, freight rail, passenger ferry, air travel, and alternative modes like cycling and walking pathways.

=== Devonport Airport ===
Devonport Airport, located about 7 kilometres (4.3 mi) east of the city at Pardoe Downs, can be reached within a 15-minute car journey. The airport is served by QantasLink and Rex Airlines, providing non-stop flights to Melbourne. QantasLink operates four daily Bombardier Dash 8 turboprop services to Melbourne.

Encompassing 308 hectares (760 acres), the airport features a main runway measuring 1,838 by 45 metres (6,030 ft × 148 ft) and a secondary grassed runway spanning 880 by 30 metres (2,887 ft × 98 ft). Its infrastructure includes comprehensive taxiways, passenger terminals and general aviation, and maintenance hangars. Recent upgrades in 2020 enhanced the terminal with a new departure lounge, upgraded security, and a dedicated freight apron.

The airport offers car parking, rental cars and taxi facilities. It is connected to Devonport by public transport, with bus services operated by Kinetic (formerly including Merseylink) and local taxi services.

=== Freight transport ===
From Devonport, two operators provide roll-on/roll-off freight service across Bass Strait to Victoria:

- SeaRoad runs a dedicated RoRo freight service between Devonport and Melbourne using purpose-built vessels.
- Spirit of Tasmania provides RoRo ferry services that carry vehicles, trailers, and freight between Devonport and Geelong.

Cement Australia has been exporting cement from Railton to Melbourne since 1926. Additional exports by ship include tallow, while coal was an export until the closure of the Fingal Valley coal mine. Imports to Devonport include petroleum, bunker fuel, fertiliser and caustic soda.

Due for completion in 2027, the $240 million Quaylink project, a TasPorts investment of new berths and terminal facilities, is expected to further boost the port's freight operations by 40%.

=== Rail ===
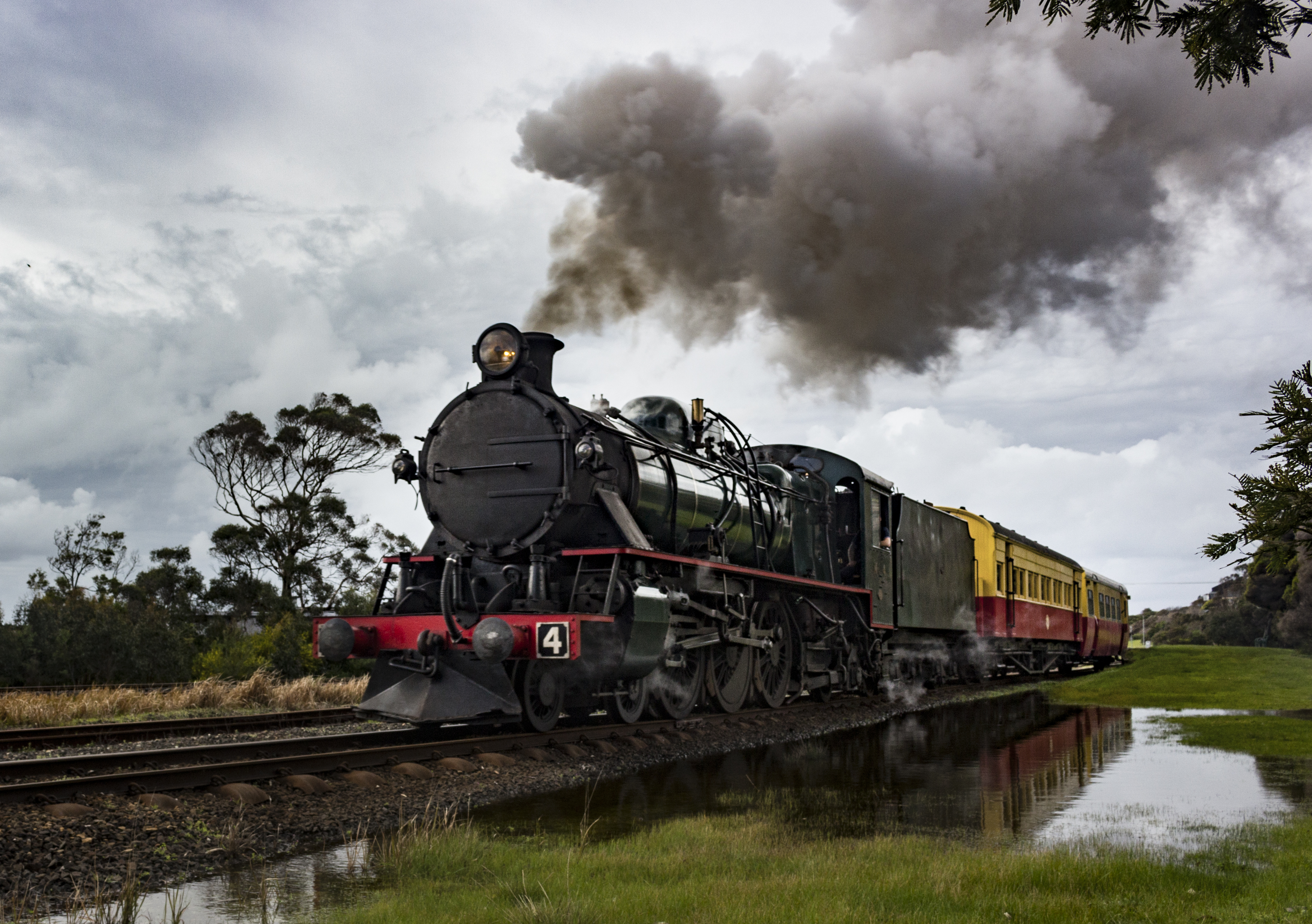
The Don River Railway

TasRail maintains a freight rail line that connects the port area to Burnie and Railton. Devonport had a railway station that was demolished in 1983.

Situated in Don, the Don River Railway is a volunteer-run heritage railway and museum providing an opportunity for visitors to enjoy a passenger train ride from Don to Coles Beach. The railway journey traces a reconstructed section of the former Melrose line, historically connecting Don Junction to Paloona.

=== Passenger ferries ===
The Spirit Quay serves as the departure point for the Spirit of Tasmania ferries (Spirit of Tasmania IV and Spirit of Tasmania V) that travel from Devonport to Geelong, Victoria, taking approximately 11 hours for the voyage. These ferries are crucial for transporting passengers, vehicles, and freight between Tasmania and the Australian mainland, providing an essential link across the Bass Strait. A ferry service connecting east and west of Devonport named The Spirit of Devonport ceased operations on the Mersey River after more than 160 years in 2022.

Devonport Passenger Ferry History

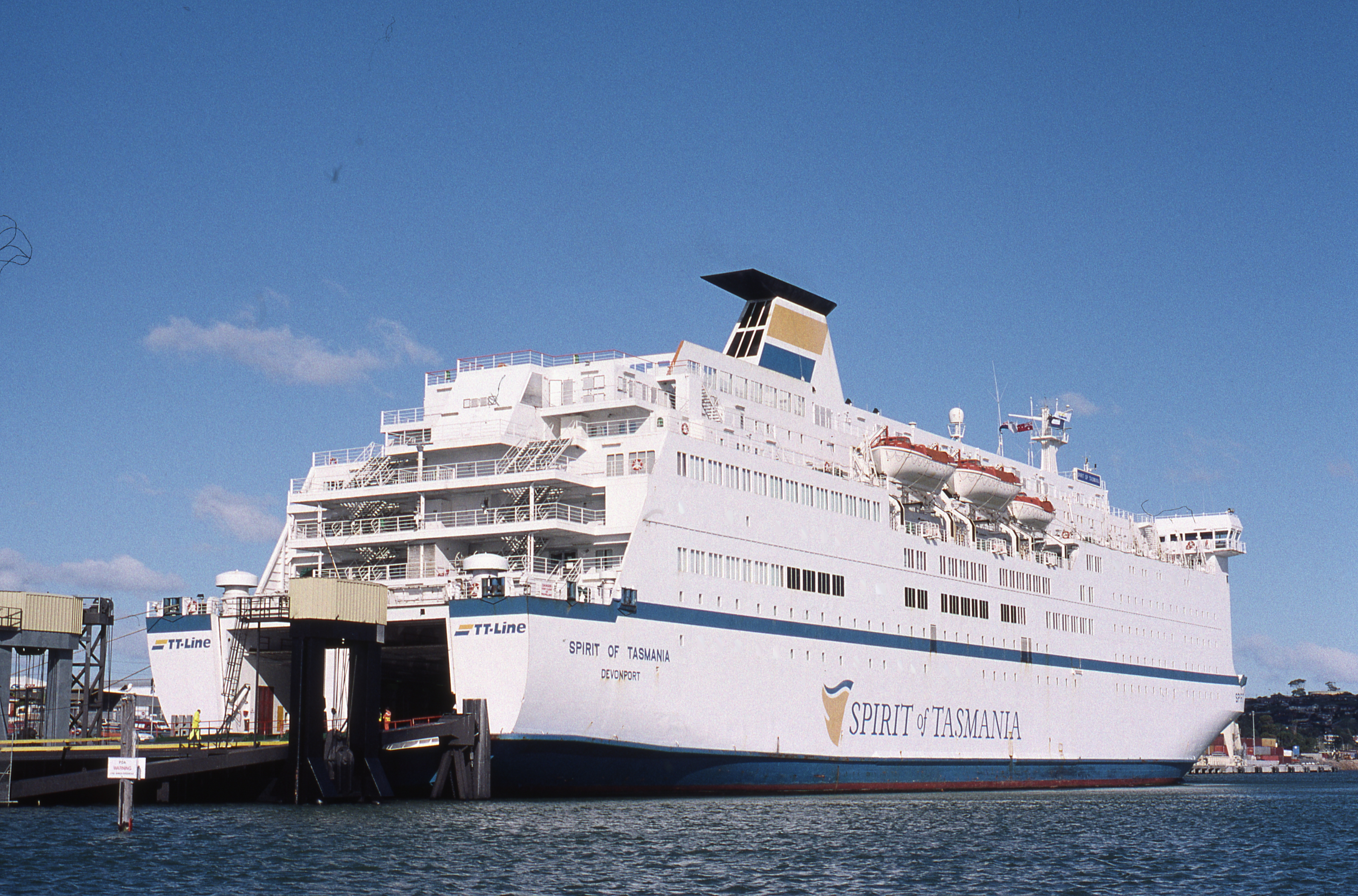
The first Spirit of Tasmania, 1999

Vessel	Destination	Years	Operator
Oonah	Melbourne	1921–1935	Tasmanian Steamers
Loongana	Melbourne	1921–1935	Tasmanian Steamers
Nairana	Melbourne	1921–1948	Tasmanian Steamers
Taroona	Melbourne	1935–1959	Tasmanian Steamers
Princess of Tasmania	Melbourne	1959–1972	Australian National Line
Empress of Australia	Melbourne	1972–1986	Australian National Line
Abel Tasman	Melbourne	1986–1993	Spirit of Tasmania
Spirit of Tasmania	Melbourne	1993–2002	Spirit of Tasmania
Spirit of Tasmania I	Melbourne	2002–2022	Spirit of Tasmania
Spirit of Tasmania II	Melbourne	2002–2022	Spirit of Tasmania
Spirit of Tasmania III	Sydney	2003–2006	Spirit of Tasmania
Spirit of Tasmania I	Geelong	2022–	Spirit of Tasmania
Spirit of Tasmania II	Geelong	2022–	Spirit of Tasmania

== Agriculture ==
Situated within a modest expanse of 114 square kilometres (44 sq mi), Devonport has a solid history in agriculture. Despite the region's spatial limitations, Devonport has been a linchpin in Tasmania's vegetable cultivation, yielding substantial quantities of beans, onions, peas, and potatoes. The post-World War II era witnessed a transformative phase marked by the establishment of processing factories, with a specific emphasis on peas. These facilities assumed a crucial role in the canning, freezing, and dehydrating processes, not only bolstering local sustenance but also fundamentally influencing Tasmania's broader agricultural and food production paradigm. Devonport has since emerged as a key contributor to Australia's agricultural production, with a significant supporting dairy industry, cereals, poppyseed oil and pyrethrum.

== Education ==
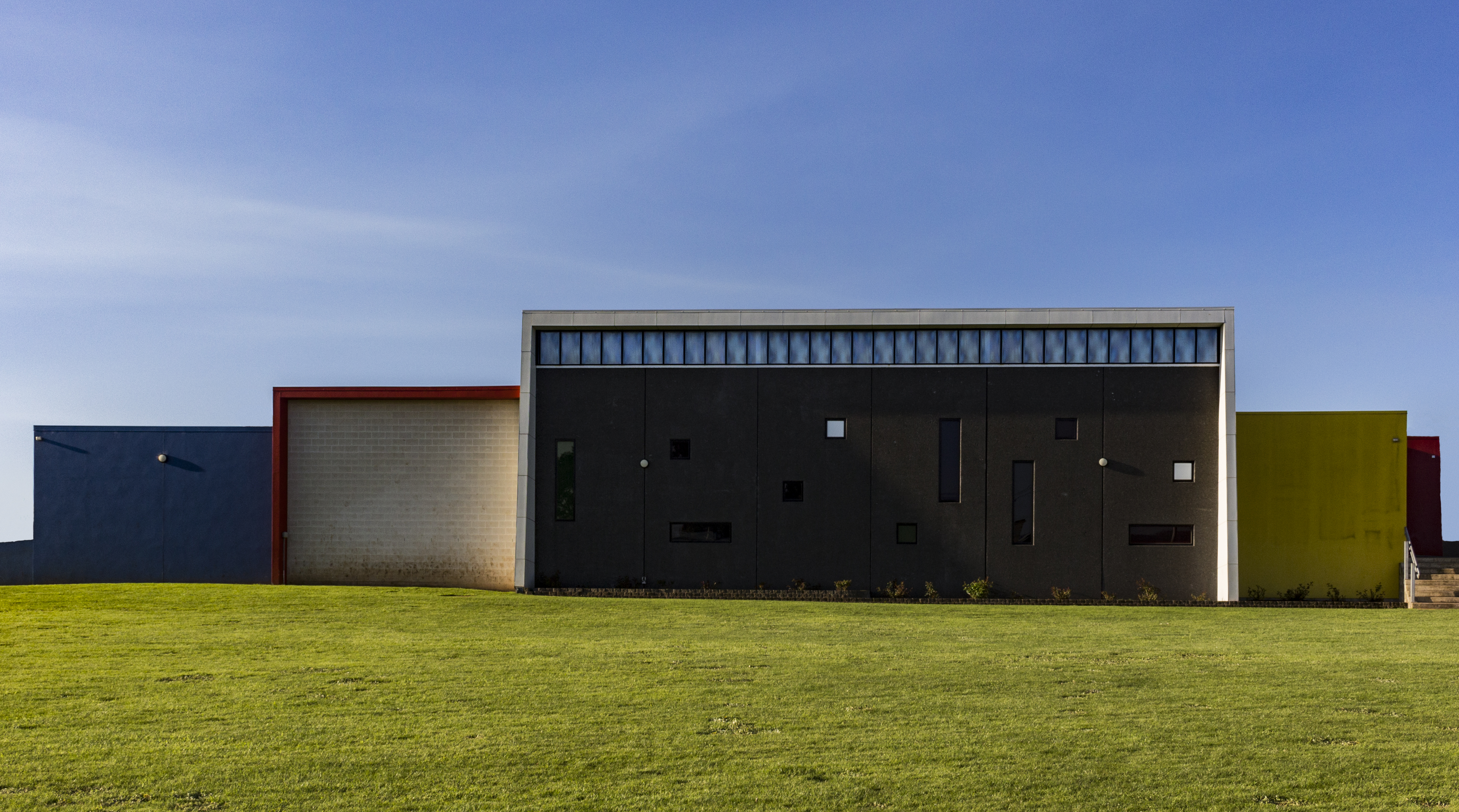
Our Lady of Lourdes Catholic Primary School

Devonport has a range of government, Catholic and independent educational institutions providing primary, secondary and senior secondary education, as well as vocational and adult training.

=== Primary schools ===
- Hillcrest Primary School
- Devonport Primary School
- Miandetta Primary School
- East Devonport Primary School
- Nixon Street Primary School
- Spreyton Primary School
- Devonport Christian School
- Our Lady of Lourdes Catholic Primary School

=== Secondary schools (Years 7–10) ===
- Devonport High School
- Reece High School
- St Brendan-Shaw College
- Devonport Christian School

=== Senior secondary education (Years 11–12) ===
- Don College
- St Brendan-Shaw College

Vocational education and adult training is provided by a TasTAFE campus located on Valley Road, offering trade training, apprenticeships and certificate-level courses serving Devonport and the wider North West Coast.

== Sport and recreation ==
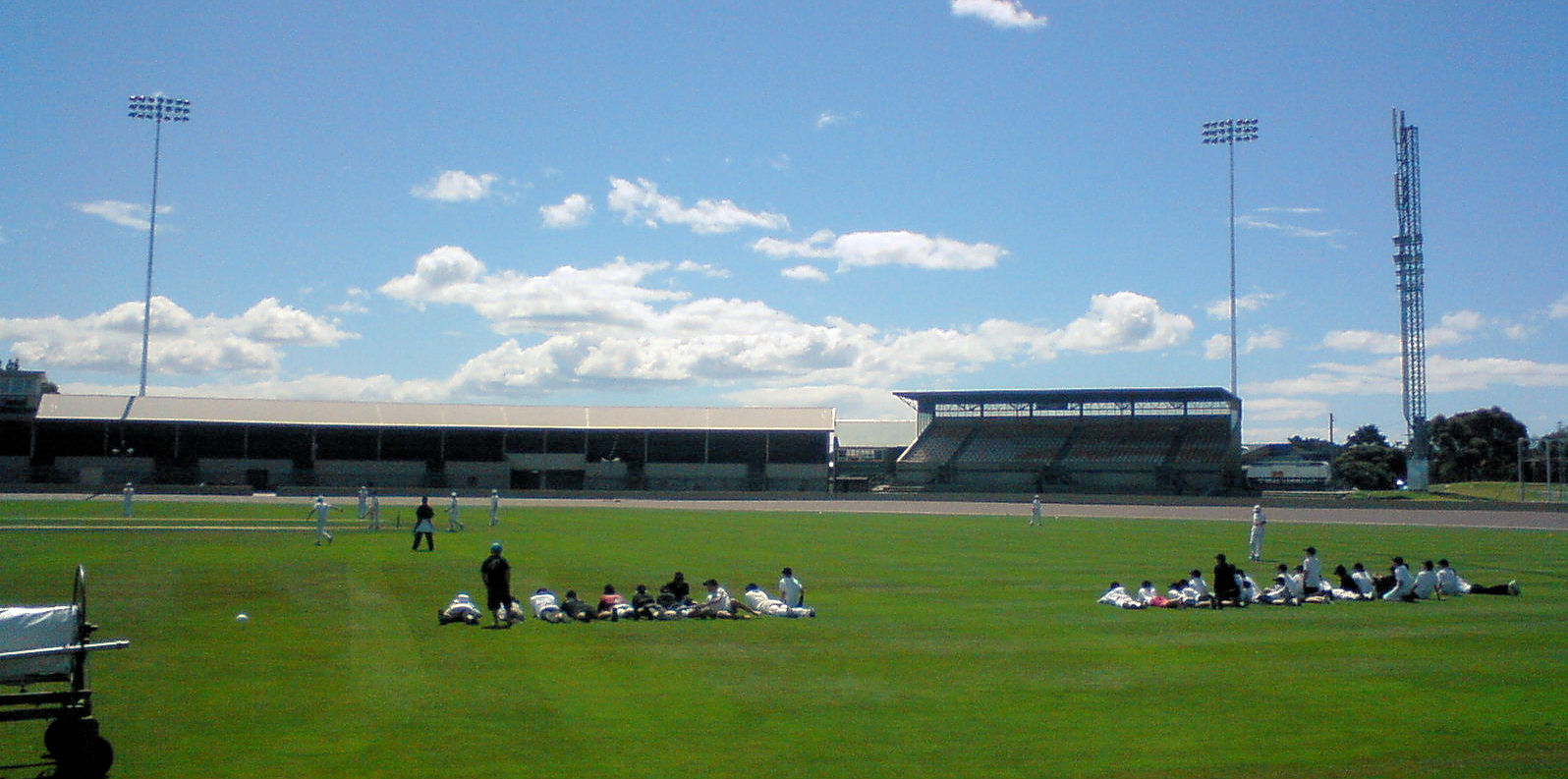
Devonport Oval, 2009.

Devonport offers a range of sporting and recreational facilities, includin sporting grounds and public open space, such as the coastal Mersey Bluff Cultural Discovery Walk, Heritage Walk Track and the Tasmanian Arboretum providing recreational walking tracks.

Australian rules football is represented by the Devonport Football Club (Magpies), which competes in the North West Football League (NWFL) and won consecutive Senior Premierships in 2021 and 2022. The East Devonport Football Club (Swans) also competes in the NWFL, alongside clubs such as Ulverstone and Penguin. Rugby union is represented by the Devonport Rugby Club, which competes in the Tasmanian Rugby Union Statewide League.

In association football, Devonport City Football Club competes in the National Premier Leagues Tasmania, with a reserve side playing in the Northern Championship.

Cricket is represented by the Devonport Cricket Club, which competes in the North Western Tasmanian Cricket Association. Hockey teams from Devonport participate in competitions administered by Hockey Tasmania.

Basketball is centred on the Devonport Warriors. The club is the largest in the North West Basketball Union and has hosted national events, including the Under-14 Australian Junior Championships in 1974. The Warriors also represented Devonport in the National Basketball League during the 1983 and 1984 seasons.

Netball in the Devonport region is administered by the Devon Netball Association, based in Spreyton, with teams participating in statewide competitions.

Golf is represented by the Devonport Golf Club, which has hosted tournaments including the Tasmanian Open and Tasmanian Seniors Open. The annual Devonport Regatta includes powerboat racing and other water-based events, while the Devonport Cup, held in January, is a major thoroughbred horse racing event.

The annual Devonport Triathlon, held in February, serves as an Oceania continental championship event.

=== Sporting venues ===
Major sporting venues in Devonport include Devonport Oval, which hosts Australian rules football and cricket, and the Devonport Recreation Centre, which is the home venue of the Devonport Warriors basketball club. Aquatic and fitness facilities are provided by the Splash Devonport Aquatic and Leisure Centre at the Don Reserve. Tennis facilities are operated by the Devonport Tennis Club and East Devonport Tennis Club, which compete in competitions administered by the Tennis North West Association. Touch football is organised by the Devonport Touch Football Association at Meercroft Park. The Spreyton Racecourse hosts thoroughbred horse racing events, including the Devonport Cup.

== Notable residents ==
=== Arts ===
- John Heyer (1916–2001), documentary filmmaker often described as the father of Australian documentary film
- Monique Brumby, indie pop/rock singer-songwriter, guitarist and producer
- Phil Manning, blues songwriter, guitarist and vocalist of Chain
- Tamara McKinley, author of the Cliffehaven series under the pen name Ellie Dean
- Syd Nicholls (1896–1977), cartoonist best known for the long-running comic strip Fatty Finn
- Gerard Vaughan, art historian and curator

=== Other ===
- Max Bound (1924–2012), trade unionist and environmental activist
- Tim Lane, sports broadcaster and journalist
- William Holyman (1833–1919), mariner and shipping magnate
- Victor Clive Holyman (1894–1934), aviator
- Ivan Nello Holyman (1896–1957), airline founder
- Rodney Croome, Tasmanian gay rights activist

=== Politicians ===
- Mike Gaffney, Independent member of the Tasmanian Legislative Council
- Jacqui Lambie, Senator for Tasmania
- Dame Enid Lyons (1897–1981), First woman elected to the House of Representatives and the first woman to serve in the federal cabinet
- Joseph Lyons (1879–1939), 10th Prime Minister of Australia (1932–1939), 26th Premier of Tasmania (1923–1928)
- Steve Martin, Senator for Tasmania (2018–2019)
- Hector McFie (1898–1982), Independent member for Mersey (1954–1972)
- Max Poulter (1913–1962), educator and politician, Senator for Queensland (1961)
- Jeremy Rockliff, 47th premier of Tasmania

=== Sportspeople ===
- John Bowe, V8 Supercar driver
- Nita Burke, Australia women's national basketball team player
- Corey Cadby, darts player
- Marty Clarke, professional basketball player and coach, 1989 NBL Champion (North Melbourne Giants)
- David Foster, woodchopper
- Owen Kelly, NASCAR and V8 Supercar driver
- Jim Nevin, cyclist who competed at the 1952 and 1956 Summer Olympics
- David Parsons, V8 Supercar driver

==== VFL/AFL players ====
- Darrel Baldock (1938–2011), St Kilda (1962–1968)
- Grant Birchall, Hawthorn (2006–2019), Brisbane Lions (2020–2021)
- Matthew Febey, Melbourne (1987, 1990–2000)
- Steven Febey, Melbourne (1987–2001)
- Ben Harrison, Carlton (1995), Richmond (1996–2000), Western Bulldogs (2001–2005)
- Brady Rawlings, North Melbourne (1999–2011)
- Jade Rawlings, Hawthorn (1996–2003), Western Bulldogs (2004–2005), North Melbourne (2006)
- Matthew Richardson, Richmond (1993–2009)
- Dion Scott, Sydney (1990, 1992), Brisbane Bears (1993–1996), Brisbane Lions (1997–1999)
- Graham Wright, Collingwood (1988–1998)

== Sister cities ==
- Minamata, Japan (1996). The City of Devonport has a formal sister city agreement with Minamata City in Japan. This was ratified in 1996. Both cities share a similar setting and area.

== See also ==
- The Tasmanian Arboretum
