= North Motton, Tasmania =

North Motton Tasmania
- Coordinates: 41°11′59″S 146°05′52″E
- Population: 425 (SAL 2021)
- Postcode(s): 7315
- Location: 28 km (17 mi) W of Devonport
- LGA(s): Central Coast
- Region: North West
- State electorate(s): Braddon
- Federal division(s): Braddon
Localities around North Motton:
Riana	West Ulverstone, Penguin	West Ulverstone
Riana	North Motton	Gawler
Gunns Plains	Preston, Gunns Plains	Gawler

North Motton is a rural locality and town in the local government area of Central Coast, in the North West region of Tasmania. It is located about 28 kilometres (17 mi) west of the town of Devonport. The 2021 census recorded a population of 425 for the state suburb of North Motton.

== History ==
Land in the area was occupied by William Motton in 1854. The locality was gazetted in 1962.

== Geography ==
The River Leven forms part of the south-western boundary, flows through from south-west to north-west, and then forms much of the northern boundary.

== Road infrastructure ==
The B17 route (Preston Road) enters from the north-east and runs through to the south as Gunns Plains Road before exiting. Route C125 (a continuation of Preston Road) starts at an intersection with B17 and runs south before exiting.

== Prominent residents ==
- Paul O'Halloran, former Australian politician

== See also ==
- Murder of Chrissie Venn, unsolved 1921 crime
