= Gawler, Tasmania =

Gawler Tasmania
- Coordinates: 41°12′49″S 146°09′16″E
- Population: 703 (2021 census)
- Postcode(s): 7315
- Location: 8 km (5 mi) S of Ulverstone
- LGA(s): Central Coast
- Region: North West Tasmania
- State electorate(s): Braddon
- Federal division(s): Braddon
Localities around Gawler:
West Ulverstone	Ulverstone	Ulverstone
North Motton	Gawler	Abbotsham
Preston	Sprent	Spalford

Gawler is a locality and small rural community in the local government area of Central Coast, in the North West region of Tasmania. It is located about 8 kilometres (5.0 mi) south of the town of Ulverstone. The 2021 census determined a population of 703 for the state suburb of Gawler.

== History ==
The Gawler River, which flows through the locality to the Leven River, was named for Governor Gawler of South Australia in 1844. It is likely that the locality was named for the river.

== Road infrastructure ==
The B17 route (Gawler Road) runs from the Bass Highway through the locality, from where it provides access to many other localities before returning to the Bass Highway further west at Penguin.
