= Camena, Tasmania =

Camena Tasmania
- Coordinates: 41°10′36″S 145°57′54″E
- Population: 24 (SAL 2021)
- Postcode(s): 7316
- Location: 21 km (13 mi) SE of Burnie
- LGA(s): Central Coast
- Region: North West
- State electorate(s): Braddon
- Federal division(s): Braddon
Localities around Camena:
Natone	West Pine	West Pine
Natone	Camena	Riana
Natone	Riana	Riana

Camena is a rural locality in the local government area of Central Coast, in the North West region of Tasmania. It is located about 21 kilometres (13 mi) south-east of the town of Burnie. The 2021 census determined a population of 24 for Camena.

== History ==
Prior to 1910 the area was known as South Road. Camena is an Aboriginal word for “chin”. The locality was gazetted in 1966.

== Geography ==
The Blythe River forms the western boundary.

== Road infrastructure ==
The C116 route (Camena Road) enters from the north and exits to the west. Route C192 (Scotts Road) starts at an intersection with C116 near the western boundary and runs generally south-east before exiting to the south.
