= Sulphur Creek, Tasmania =

Sulphur Creek Tasmania
- Coordinates: 41°06′29″S 146°01′00″E
- Population: 631 (2021 census)
- Postcode(s): 7316
- Location: 14 km (9 mi) SE of Burnie
- LGA(s): Central Coast
- Region: North West Tasmania
- State electorate(s): Braddon
- Federal division(s): Braddon
Localities around Sulphur Creek:
Howth	Bass Strait	Preservation Bay
Cuprona	Sulphur Creek	Penguin
Cuprona	West Pine	Penguin

Sulphur Creek is a locality and small rural community in the local government area of Central Coast, in the North West region of Tasmania. It is located about 14 kilometres (8.7 mi) south-east of the town of Burnie. Bass Strait forms the northern boundary of the locality. The 2021 census determined a population of 631 for the state suburb of Sulphur Creek.

== History ==
A watercourse named Sulphur Creek flows through the locality to Bass Strait. It is likely that the locality was named for the creek, which is believed to have been so named due to a sulphur-like smell in the area when first explored by Europeans.

== Road infrastructure ==
The C118 route (Nine Mile Road) intersects with the Bass Highway at the north-western extremity of the locality, from where it runs south through Howth before passing through the locality and providing access to many others.
