= Natone, Tasmania =

Natone
- Town
- Coordinates: 41°10′04″S 145°55′52″E
- Country: Australia
- State: Tasmania
- Region: North West
- LGA: Burnie
- Location: 17 km (11 mi) S of Burnie

Government
  - State electorate: Braddon
  - Federal division: Braddon

Population
  - Total: 281 (2016 census)
- Postcode: 7321
Localities around Natone
| Stowport | Stowport | Cuprona |
| Upper Stowport | Natone | Cuprona, West Pine, Camena |
| Upper Natone | Upper Natone | Riana |

Natone is a locality and small rural community in the local government area of Burnie in the North West region of Tasmania. It is located about 17 kilometres (11 mi) south of the town of Burnie. The 2016 census determined a population of 281 for the state suburb of Natone.

== History ==
The locality name is an Aboriginal word meaning "peak" and is the original name of the nearby St Valentines Peak. It was gazetted in 1966.

== Geography ==
The Blythe River forms the eastern boundary.

== Road infrastructure ==
The C102 route (Natone Road / Upper Natone Road) passes through from north to south-west. Route C114 (Lottah Road) starts at an intersection with C102 and runs south-west before exiting. Route C116 (Camena Road) starts at an intersection with C102 and runs south-east before exiting.
