= West Ulverstone, Tasmania =

West Ulverstone Tasmania
- Coordinates: 41°08′50″S 146°07′40″E
- Population: 4,515 (2021 census)
- Postcode(s): 7315
- Location: 7 km (4 mi) NW of Ulverstone
- LGA(s): Central Coast
- Region: North West Tasmania
- State electorate(s): Braddon
- Federal division(s): Braddon
Localities around West Ulverstone:
Penguin	Bass Strait	Bass Strait
Penguin	West Ulverstone	Ulverstone
Riana	North Motton	Gawler

West Ulverstone is a locality and suburb of Ulverstone in the local government area of Central Coast, in the North West region of Tasmania. It is located about 7 kilometres (4.3 mi) north-west of the town of Ulverstone. The Bass Highway passes through from south-east to north-west. The Leven River forms the eastern and most of the southern boundary. The 2021 census determined a population of 4515 for the state suburb of West Ulverstone. The Central Coast Council has recently redeveloped the area to increase tourism. 2010 saw the completion of a new basketball stadium, the Schweppes Arena. The arena holds around 1,100 people, cost $5.5 million to build and was completed just behind schedule. it overlooks the River Leven and is situated just behind the former stadium.

== History ==
The name Ulverstone is believed to be derived from Ulverston in England.

== Road infrastructure ==
The C142 route (South Road) terminates at the Bass Highway in West Ulverstone. It runs east through the locality and then further east before rejoining the Bass Highway in Ulverstone.
