= Preservation Bay, Tasmania =

Preservation Bay Tasmania
- Coordinates: 41°06′19″S 146°02′52″E
- Population: 100 (2021 census)
- Postcode(s): 7316
- Location: 16 km (10 mi) NW of Ulverstone
- LGA(s): Central Coast
- Region: North-west and west
- State electorate(s): Braddon
- Federal division(s): Braddon
Localities around Preservation Bay:
Bass Strait	Bass Strait	Bass Strait
Penguin, Sulphur Creek	Preservation Bay	Penguin
Penguin	Penguin	Penguin

Preservation Bay is a rural locality in the local government area (LGA) of Central Coast in the North-west and west LGA region of Tasmania. The locality is about 16 kilometres (9.9 mi) north-west of the town of Ulverstone. The 2021 census recorded a population of 100 for the state suburb of Preservation Bay.

== History ==
Preservation Bay is a confirmed locality.

The locality was first settled by Europeans in 1852.

== Geography ==
The waters of Preservation Bay, an inlet of Bass Strait, form the northern boundary. The Western Railway Line passes through from north-east to north-west.

== Road infrastructure ==
National Route 1 (Bass Highway) passes to the south. From there, Preservation Drive provides access to the locality.
