= Gunns Plains Cave =

Cave in Tasmania, Australia

Coordinates: 41.2960°S 146.0055°E

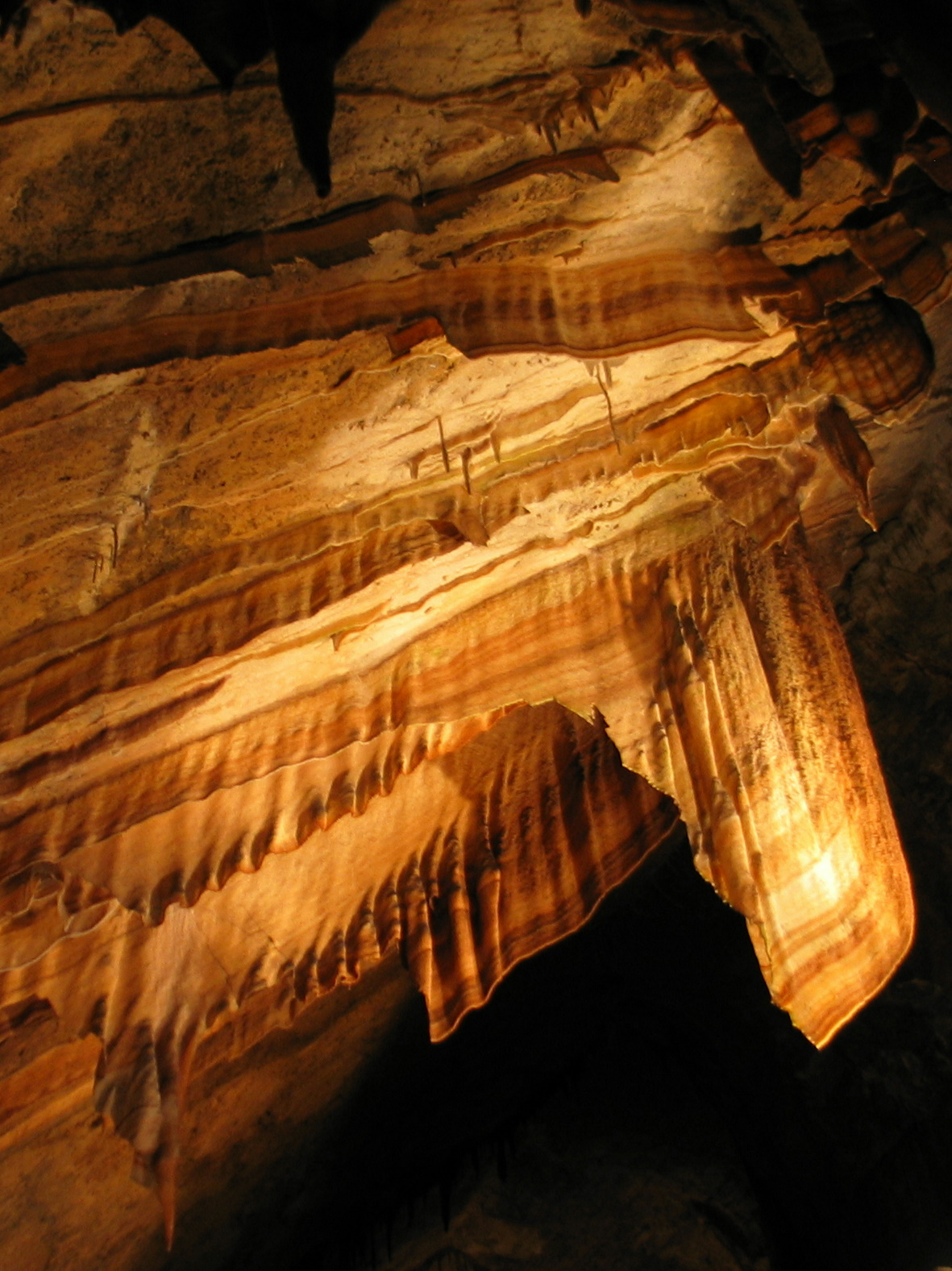
Flowstone suspended from the ceiling of Gunns Plains Cave, Tasmania, Australia

Gunns Plains Cave is a limestone show cave, near Gunns Plains in the North West of Tasmania, twenty kilometres from Ulverstone.

== History ==
The cave was first entered in 1906 by a local Gunns Plains man, Bill Woodhouse, while hunting for possums. A possum eluded him down a hole which led him directly to the cave. This opening served as the original entrance to the cave and early tourists needed to descend by rope from it, three stories to the cave floor. 54 steps were later constructed from concrete, leading from the natural cave floor to a new entrance cut into the hillside. This steep and narrow staircase still exists in its entirety and remains the only public entrance and exit to the cave

Because candlelight and torchlight were troublesome, power and fixture lighting was installed throughout to illuminate the walking track and the cave's unique features. In 2003 the system was updated to be of more benefit to visitors.

As of 2004 the cave is maintained on behalf of the Tasmania Parks and Wildlife Service by Geoff and Patricia Deer, who lease the rights to manage the cave. There are daily tours. The cave tour was fully re-lit using LED lighting in 2008.

== Features ==
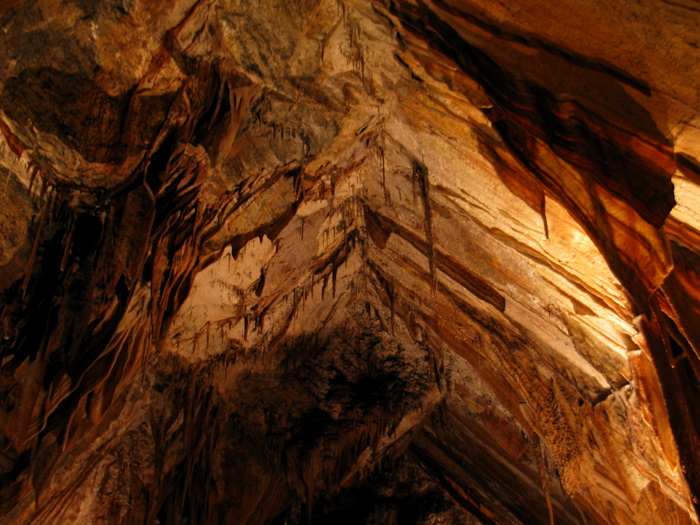
A naturally formed vaulted ceiling in the cave.

The public section of the cave runs 275 metres and is maintained for public access. A variety of cave formations are present, such as stalactites, stalagmites, helictites and a large array of flowstone are present in the public section of the cave.

A further one kilometre of wild cave was mapped in the early 20th century, but is more difficult to access.

== Nature ==
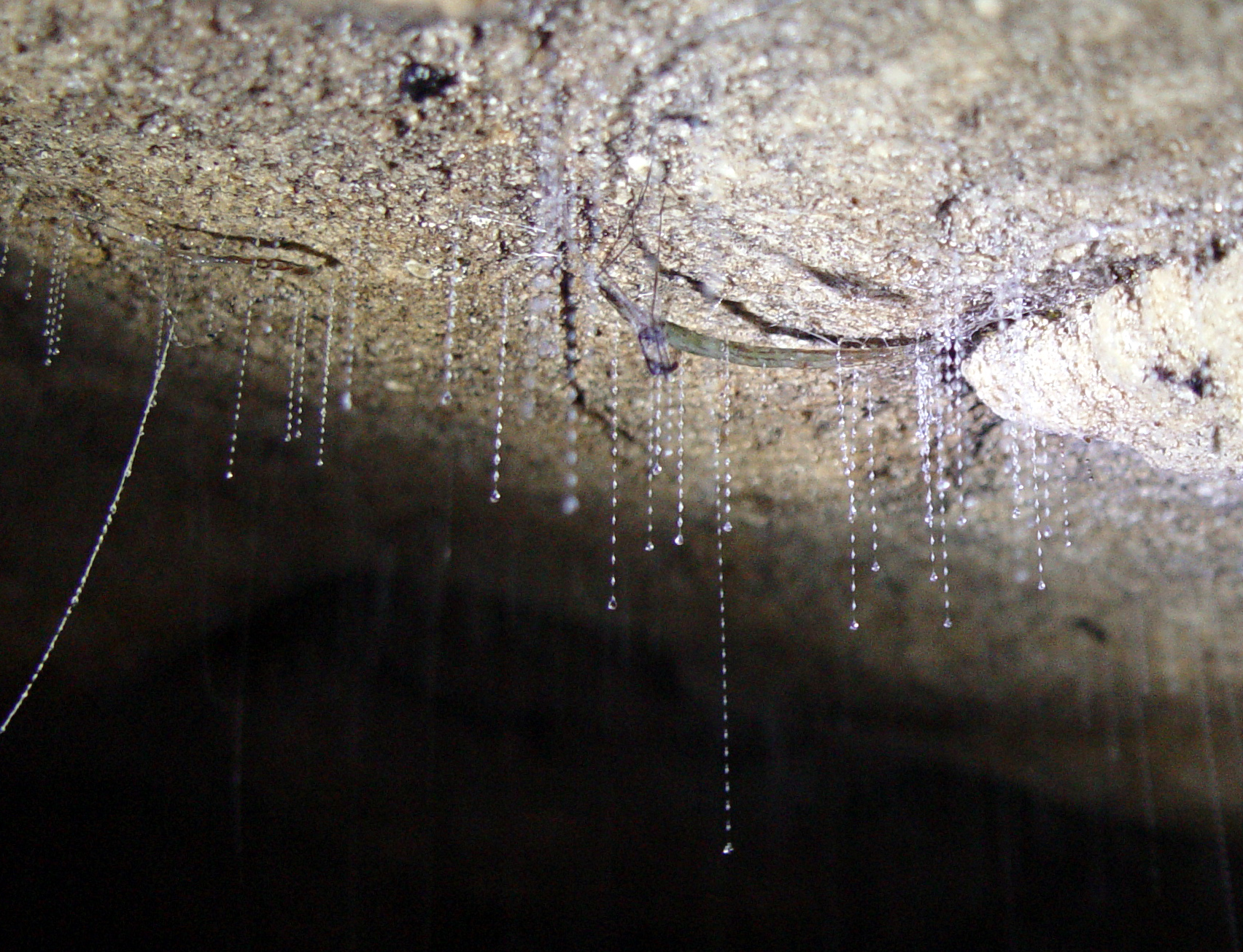
Arachnocampa's silk threads.

The cave is a host to an assortment of wildlife. The cave is inhabited by the endangered Tasmanian Giant Freshwater Crayfish, Platypus, freshwater fish and eels. Glow worms (Arachnocampa) can be consistently found with their silk threads dangling from the ceiling. Cave crickets and spiders are also present.

== See also ==
- Gunns Plains
- List of caves in Australia
- Show cave
