= Frank McDonald =

Frank McDonald may refer to:

- Frank McDonald (journalist) (1950–2026), environment editor of The Irish Times
- Frank McDonald (director) (1899–1980), American film director
- Frank McDonald (footballer) (1899–1962), Australian footballer
- Frank B. McDonald (1925–2012), astrophysicist and creator of the Voyager probe
- Frank F. McDonald, former mayor of Evansville, Indiana
- Frank McDonald (American football) (born c. 1933), American football player
- Frank McDonald, Sr (1912–1997), mayor of Evansville, Indiana, 1960–1972
- Frank McDonald, II (born 1951), mayor of Evansville, Indiana, 1987–2000

== See also ==
- Francis McDonald (disambiguation)
- Franklin M. McDonald (1850–?), soldier
- Frank MacDonald (1896–2003), final surviving Tasmanian veteran of World War I
- Frankie MacDonald (born 1984), amateur weather man
