= Central Coast Council =

Central Coast Council may refer to:

- Central Coast Council (New South Wales), a local government area in New South Wales, Australia
- Central Coast Council (Tasmania), a local government area in Tasmania, Australia
