= West Pine, Tasmania =

West Pine Tasmania
- Coordinates: 41°09′11″S 146°00′05″E
- Population: 142 (2021 census)
- Postcode(s): 7316
- Location: 19 km (12 mi) SE of Burnie
- LGA(s): Central Coast
- Region: North West Tasmania
- State electorate(s): Braddon
- Federal division(s): Braddon
Localities around West Pine:
Cuprona	Sulphur Creek	Penguin
Cuprona	West Pine	Penguin
Camena	Riana	Riana

West Pine is a locality and small rural community in the local government area of Central Coast, in the North West region of Tasmania. It is located about 19 kilometres (12 mi) south-east of the town of Burnie. The 2021 census determined a population of 142 for the state suburb of West Pine.

== Road infrastructure ==
The B17 route (Pine Road) runs from the Bass Highway through the eastern part of locality, from where it provides access to many other localities further south. The C116 (West Pine Road), C117 (Cuprona Road), and C118 (Daveys Road) routes all traverse parts of the locality and also provide access to the south.
