= Abbotsham, Tasmania =

Abbotsham
- Town
- Coordinates: 41°12′53″S 146°11′11″E
- Country: Australia
- State: Tasmania
- Region: North-west and west
- LGA: Central Coast
- Location: 11 km (6.8 mi) S of Ulverstone
- Established: 1962

Government
  - State electorate: Braddon
  - Federal division: Braddon

Population
  - Total: 89 (2021 census)
- Postcode: 7315
Localities around Abbotsham
Gawler	Ulverstone	Forth
Gawler	Abbotsham	Forth
Gawler	Spalford	Spalford

Abbotsham is a rural locality in the local government area (LGA) of Central Coast in the North-west and west LGA region of Tasmania. The locality is about 11 kilometres (6.8 mi) south of the town of Ulverstone. The 2021 census recorded a population of 89 for Abbotsham.

== History ==
Abbotsham was gazetted as a locality in 1962. The name was in use by 1877 but not shown on maps until after 1883.

== Geography ==
Almost all of the boundaries are survey lines.

== Road infrastructure ==
Route B15 (Castra Road) passes through from north to south.
