= Murder of Chrissie Venn =

1921 murder case in Tasmania, Australia

Chrissie Venn
- Born: Chrissie Clare Venn; 25 July 1907
- Died: 26 February 1921 (aged 13); North Motton near Ulverstone, Tasmania, Australia
- Known for: Murder victim
- Parents: George Arthur Venn (father); Eva May Venn (mother)

Chrissie Clare Venn (25 July 1907 – 26 February 1921) was a 13-year-old Australian girl whose murder outside the village of North Motton near Ulverstone, Tasmania, remains unsolved.

== The murder ==
Venn was the daughter of George Arthur and Eva May (née Chilcott) Venn.

Most sources state – and it is generally accepted – that at approximately 5 p.m. on 20 February 1921, Venn left the family home on Allison Road to run some errands in the village of North Motton – a distance of approximately three miles – and never returned home. A search was mounted but it was not until the morning of March 1 that her mutilated body was found in a hollow tree stump located close to the road where she would have travelled as she walked to North Motton.

Another source gives differing details: The murder purportedly occurred on 26 February 1921. The body was not mutilated and Venn had either been suffocated or strangled. George William King was tried for the crime in a trial that commenced on 2 August 1921. The trial had been moved from the North West Coast of Tasmania to Hobart, the first change of venue ever requested and approved for a trial in Tasmania. George William King was defended by Albert Ogilvie, who went on to become Premier of Tasmania. King was acquitted of the murder.

== George William King ==
King had been a member of the search party. He became a suspect in Venn's murder due to marks on his hands that he ascribed to an accident during the search for Venn. King, a 35-year-old former miner and policeman, was arrested on 8 March and charged with her murder. King's trial started in Hobart during June and on 11 August he was acquitted.

== Burial and ghost ==
Venn was interred at the North Motton Methodist Cemetery. Her ghost is claimed to haunt the area of her murder.

== See also ==
- List of solved missing person cases (pre-1950)
- List of unsolved murders (1900–1979)
