= Leven Canyon =

Coordinates: 41.3969°S 146.0238°E

Leven Canyon is a tourist destination on the River Leven (Tasmania). It is located 42 kilometres (26 mi) from Ulverstone in Tasmania.

The river runs through 300-metre (980 ft) limestone cliffs carved through the Loongana Range, down to Bass Strait.

== Tourism ==
The canyon is a little-known tourist destination in Tasmania. However, the viewing platform has views of Black Bluff, the canyon itself and the surrounding areas. The viewing platform is only a short walk from the car park and only street shoes are required. As well, there are other walks in the general area, as well as barbecue and picnic facilities. The viewing platform area is managed by the Central Coast Council.

The Central Coast Council tourism strategy is called, "Coast to Canyon", a reference to the Leven Canyon.

The Penguin Cradle Trail, a bush walking track developed by the North West Walking Club, crosses the canyon.

== Canyon and Bluff Working Group ==
The Canyon and Bluff Working Group are a group of conservationists who established themselves so as to work for the protection of the Leven Canyon, Black Bluff area. They are well supported by local businesses and other community groups.

Agreement was reached in 2004 with Forestry Tasmania over logging in the area.
