= Spalford, Tasmania =

Spalford Tasmania
- Coordinates: 41°14′11″S 146°11′12″E
- Population: 55 (SAL 2021)
- Postcode(s): 7315
- Location: 13 km (8 mi) S of Ulverstone
- LGA(s): Central Coast
- Region: North-west and west
- State electorate(s): Braddon
- Federal division(s): Braddon
Localities around Spalford:
Abbotsham	Abbotsham	Forth
Gawler	Spalford	Kindred
Sprent	Kindred, Sprent	Kindred

Spalford is a rural locality in the local government area (LGA) of Central Coast in the North-west and west LGA region of Tasmania. The locality is about 13 kilometres (8.1 mi) south of the town of Ulverstone. The 2021 census recorded a population of 55 for the state suburb of Spalford.

== History ==
Spalford was gazetted as a locality in 1962.

It is believed to have been named for Spalford in England.

== Geography ==
Most boundaries are survey lines.

== Road infrastructure ==
Route B15 (Castra Road) passes through from north-west to south.
