= Ferndene State Reserve =

Protected area in Tasmania, Australia

- IUCN category III (natural monument or feature)
- Fern Dene and small stream in the summer

- Location within Tasmania
- Location: Tasmania
- Nearest city: Penguin
- Coordinates: 41.1484°S 146.0337°E
- Area: 35.16 ha (86.9 acres)
- Established: 1939
- Governing body: Tasmania Parks and Wildlife Service

The Ferndene State Reserve is a protected area in the Dial Range of northwest Tasmania, Australia. It comprises 35.16 hectares (86.9 acres) and is managed by the Tasmania Parks and Wildlife Service. It was established on 2 August 1939 and is described by the Parks and Wildlife Service as a "scenic fern glade".
