= Howth (disambiguation) =

Howth is a village and outer suburb of Dublin, Ireland.

Howth may also refer to:

- Howth, Tasmania, a locality in Tasmania, Australia
- Earl of Howth, a title in the Peerage of Ireland, including Lords of Howth and Barons Howth
