= Chasm Creek =

- Town
- Coordinates: 41°04′10″S 145°57′44″E
- Country: Australia
- State: Tasmania
- Region: North-west and west
- LGA: Burnie
- Location: 6 km (3.7 mi) E of Burnie

Government
  - State electorate: Braddon
  - Federal division: Braddon

Population
  - Total: 68 (2016 census)
- Postcode: 7321
Localities around Chasm Creek
Round Hill	Bass Strait	Bass Strait
Round Hill	Chasm Creek	Heybridge
Round Hill	Heybridge	Heybridge

Chasm Creek is a rural locality in the local government area (LGA) of Burnie in the North-west and west LGA region of Tasmania. The locality is about 6 kilometres (3.7 mi) east of the town of Burnie. The 2016 census recorded a population of 68 for the state suburb of Chasm Creek.

== History ==
Chasm Creek was gazetted as a locality in 1966.

== Geography ==
The waters of Bass Strait form the northern boundary. The Western Railway Line passes through from north-east to north-west.

== Road infrastructure ==
National Route 1 (Bass Highway) runs from north-east to north-west.
