= Nita Burke =

Australian basketball player

No. 9 – Opals
- League: Tasmania Basketball League

Personal information
- Born: 27 April 1937 (age 89) Ulverstone, Tasmania

Career highlights
- Tasmanian Sports Hall of Fame (1991)

Nita Margaret Burke (née French - born 27 April 1937) is a retired Australian women's basketball player.

== Biography ==
Burke was born in Ulverstone, Tasmania. After starting out playing netball, she switched to basketball, playing for Tasmania at the 1956 National Championships. Burke was selected for the Australia women's national basketball team, representing her country six times in international competition. She was captain of the national team during their 1963 Asian tour, when they won 14 of the 15 games played. At official FIBA events, Burke played at the 1957 World Championships in Rio de Janeiro, Brazil.

Burke moved to coaching and administration after retiring as a player in 1966. She was inducted into the Tasmanian Sporting Hall of Fame in 1991. Burke is one of only three basketballers inducted into the Hall of Fame.
