= Francis MacDonald (disambiguation) =

Francis MacDonald is a British musician and composer, best known as the drummer of Teenage Fanclub.

Francis or Frances MacDonald or McDonald may also refer to:

- Francis McDonald (1891–1968), American film actor
- Francis McDonald (politician) (1860–1938), Australian member of parliament
- F. James McDonald (1922–2010), engineer
- Frances MacDonald (1873–1921), Scottish artist
- Frances Macdonald (English artist) (1914–2002), English artist
- Francis McDonald (footballer) (born 1975), Saint Lucian footballer and football manager
- Francis M. McDonald (1931–2018), chief justice of the Connecticut Supreme Court

== See also ==
- Frank McDonald (disambiguation)
