= Cuprona, Tasmania =

Cuprona
- Town
- Coordinates: 41°07′28″S 145°58′24″E
- Country: Australia
- State: Tasmania
- Region: North West Tasmania
- LGA: Central Coast
- Location: 15 km (9.3 mi) SE of Burnie

Government
  - State electorate: Braddon
  - Federal division: Braddon

Population
  - Total: 140 (2021 census)
- Postcode: 7316
Localities around Cuprona
Stowport	Heybridge	Howth
Stowport	Cuprona	West Pine
Natone	West Pine	West Pine

Cuprona is a locality and tiny rural community in the local government area of Central Coast, in the North West region of Tasmania. It is located about 15 kilometres (9.3 mi) south-east of the town of Burnie. The Blythe River forms the western boundary. The 2021 census determined a population of 140 for the state suburb of Cuprona.

== History ==
The early postal name for the locality was "Ellenton". It was changed to Cuprona in 1906.

== Road infrastructure ==
The C117 route (Cuprona Road) runs from the Bass Highway through the locality, from where it provides access to many other localities further south.
