= Heybridge, Tasmania =

Locality in Tasmania, Australia

Heybridge
- Town
- Coordinates: 41°03′49″S 145°59′31″E
- Country: Australia
- State: Tasmania
- Region: North-west and west
- LGA: Central Coast, Burnie
- Location: 18 km (11 mi) from Ulverstone; 127 km (79 mi) from Launceston; 154 km (96 mi) from Queenstown; 291 km (181 mi) from Hobart; 9 km (5.6 mi) SE of Burnie

Government
  - State electorate: Braddon
  - Federal division: Braddon

Population
  - Total: 339 (UCL 2021)
- Time zone: UTC+10 (AEST)
  - Summer (DST): UTC+11 (AEDT)
Localities around Heybridge
| Chasm Creek | Bass Strait | Bass Strait |
| Stowport, Chasm Creek | Heybridge | Howth |
| Stowport | Stowport | Howth |

Heybridge is a semi-rural locality in the local government areas (LGA) of Central Coast and Burnie in the North-west and west LGA region of the Australian island state of Tasmania. The locality is about 9 kilometres (5.6 mi) south-east of the town of Burnie. The 2021 census recorded a population of 339 for the state suburb of Heybridge. It is a village located where the Bass Highway crosses the Blythe River, and is bounded by the Blythe River National Park to the south and Bass Strait to the north.

== History ==
Heybridge was gazetted as a locality in 1966.

Blythe Heads Post Office opened in 1947 and was renamed Heybridge in 1966. It closed in 1973.

== Geography ==
The shore of Bass Strait forms most of the northern boundary. The Blythe River forms part of the southern boundary and then flows through to the north.

Heybridge is about 27m above sea level.

== Road infrastructure ==
The Bass Highway (National Route 1) passes through from north-east to north-west. Route C113 (Minna Road) starts at an intersection with Route 1 and runs south-west until it exits. Route C117 (Cuprona Road) starts at an intersection with Route 1 and runs south until it exits.
