= Riana, Tasmania =

Riana
- Town
- Coordinates: 41°12′S 145°59′E
- Country: Australia
- State: Tasmania
- LGA: Central Coast Council
- Location: 290 km (180 mi) NW of Hobart; 133 km (83 mi) NW of Launceston; 43 km (27 mi) W of Devonport

Government
  - State electorate: Braddon
  - Federal division: Braddon

Population
  - Total: 313 (2021 census)
- Postcode: 7316
Localities around Riana
Cuprona	Penguin	Dial Range
Natone	Riana	North Motton
Upper Natone	South Riana	Gunns Plains

Riana (pronounced rye-anna) is a small town in the North West region of Tasmania, south-west of the Dial Range. It is located west of the popular tourist town, Penguin. Riana and its smaller neighbouring town South Riana are a part of the municipality of the Central Coast Council

At the 2021 census, Riana had a population of 313, and neighbouring South Riana had 212.

The fertile red soil hosts paddocks of vegetables (particularly potatoes) and dairy farms.

== History ==
Riana Post Office opened on 1 August 1899. Riana South Post Office opened on 20 January 1908. The current school, Riana Primary School, has been in its current location since the 1960s. Multiple schools existed in the vicinity of Riana after World War Two; however, they were closed due to a lack of teachers.
