= Mount Montgomery State Reserve =

Protected area in Tasmania, Australia

- IUCN category III (natural monument or feature)
- Location within Tasmania
- Location: Tasmania
- Coordinates: 41°09′00″S 146°03′18″E
- Area: 3.08 km^{2} (1.19 sq mi)
- Established: 9 September 1970
- Governing body: Tasmania Parks and Wildlife Service

Mount Montgomery State Reserve is a state reserve in the Dial Range of northwest Tasmania. It comprises 308 hectares (760 acres) of land and is managed by the Tasmania Parks and Wildlife Service. It was established on 9 September 1970 and is described by the Parks and Wildlife Service as "scenic".
