= Sprent, Tasmania =

Sprent
- Town
- Coordinates: 41°15′46″S 146°09′34″E
- Country: Australia
- State: Tasmania
- Region: North West
- LGA: Central Coast
- Location: 25 km (16 mi) SW of Devonport

Government
  - State electorate: Braddon
  - Federal division: Braddon

Population
  - Total: 160 (SAL 2021)
- Postcode: 7315
Localities around Sprent
Gawler	Gawler, Spalford	Kindred
Gawler, Castra	Sprent	Kindred
Upper Castra, Castra	Upper Castra	Lower Wilmot

Sprent is a rural locality and town in the local government area of Central Coast, in the North West region of Tasmania. It is located about 25 kilometres (16 mi) south-west of the town of Devonport. The 2021 census recorded a population of 160 for the state suburb of Sprent.

== History ==
The locality was gazetted in 1965.

== Geography ==
The Wilmot River forms the south-eastern boundary, and the East Gawler River forms much of the western boundary.

== Road infrastructure ==
The B15 route (Castra Road) enters from the north-east and runs through to the south-west before exiting, where it then follows the western boundary for some distance. Route B16 (Kindred Road) starts at an intersection with B15 and runs east before exiting. Route C123 (Top Gawler Road) starts at an intersection with B15 and runs west and north before exiting.
