= Kindred, Tasmania =

Kindred
- Town
- Coordinates: 41°15′32″S 146°13′08″E
- Country: Australia
- State: Tasmania
- Region: North West
- LGA: Central Coast
- Location: 20 km (12 mi) SW of Devonport

Government
  - State electorate: Braddon
  - Federal division: Braddon

Population
  - Total: 214 (SAL 2021)
- Postcode: 7310
Localities around Kindred
| Forth | Forth | Forthside |
| Spalford, Sprent | Kindred | Paloona, Forthside |
| Sprent | Lower Wilmot | Paloona |

Kindred is a rural locality in the local government area of Central Coast, in the North West region of Tasmania. It is located about 20 kilometres (12 mi) south-west of the town of Devonport. The 2021 census determined a population of 214 for the state suburb of Kindred.

== History ==
The area was originally known as Kindred Plains. It was so named because so many settlers became related through marriage. The locality was gazetted in 1962.

== Geography ==
The Wilmot River forms the south-eastern and part of the eastern boundaries.

== Road infrastructure ==
The B16 route (Kindred Road) enters from the north and runs south through the village of Kindred before turning west and exiting. Route C132 (Wilmot Road) enters from the north mid-way along the eastern boundary and runs generally south and west, following the Wilmot River, before exiting to the south. Route C144 (Paloona Road) starts at an intersection with C132 and exits to the east.
