= Tasmanian Land Conservancy =

Australian non-profit organization

- Abbreviation: TLC
- Established: June 2001
- Legal status: Charity
- Purpose: Environmental conservation
- Headquarters: 827 Sandy Bay Road, Lower Sandy Bay
- Region served: Tasmania
- CEO: Jane Hutchinson
- Website: tasland.org.au

The Tasmanian Land Conservancy (TLC) is a non-profit, non-governmental organisation that acquires and manages land in Tasmania, Australia, protecting important natural places for biodiversity conservation. It was established in June 2001. As of 2009 the organisation claimed to have protected over 16,000 hectares (40,000 acres) of land in 144 reserves, and owned about 2,000 hectares (4,900 acres) directly, including the Vale of Belvoir, the montane grassland habitat of many marsupial carnivores, and Recherche Bay. As at January 2016, TLC had reportedly protected 65,000 hectares (160,000 acres), and was a $30 million organisation.

However, most of the reserves remain in private ownership, with covenants to hold them for conservation. Ecosystems in covenanted areas include grasslands, woodlands, heath and saltmarsh.

TLC receives funding from the Australian federal government, and private donations from supporters of particular sites or projects such as protecting birds.

One of the organisation's founding volunteers, Jane Hutchinson, was nominated as 2016 Australian of the Year for her leadership as a board member, chair of the board and chief executive officer from 2011.

== See also ==
- Protected areas of Tasmania
