= Frank MacDonald =

Australian soldier

Frank MacDonald MM (26 June 1896 – 23 August 2003) was an Australian World War I veteran, notable for having been the last surviving veteran from Tasmania, and the last surviving decorated Australian veteran.

At the time of his death, MacDonald was also the oldest surviving World War I veteran.

== Early life ==
Growing up in the Tasmanian town of Ulverstone, MacDonald said the first time he was aware of anything war related was when he was 7 years old, when watched the locals burn an effigy of South African president Paul Kruger during the Boer War which his cousin Jim served in.

== Military service ==
When World War I commenced in 1914, MacDonald attempted to enlist in the Australian Army but claimed he was rejected due to having bad teeth. However, there is no Attestation Paper for this enlistment in the National Archives of Australia. It is possible the Attestation Paper has been misplaced as the Archives acknowledge that records, although comprehensive, are not complete. After his rejection, he travelled to Queensland to work in the canefields.

Upon his return to Tasmania in 1916, MacDonald attempted to enlist again and was successful due to what he believed to be the army's desire to quickly send more troops after large numbers of Australians had been killed while fighting in the war.

MacDonald joined the 40th Battalion, an infantry battalion comprising recruits solely from Tasmania, and departed Australia aboard HMAS Berrima on 1 July 1916, arriving in England on 22 August 1916.

MacDonald fought in the First Battle of Passchendaele, walking 96 kilometres over three days to reach Ypres.

When the Germans attacked, MacDonald showed bravery and courage by working in a vulnerable position in an area that was continually under fire, determined to keep communication lines open between the battalion's forward position and headquarters.

The battalion suffered a loss of 248 men who were killed during the attack. MacDonald later recalled that on one occasion he was tying a knot in a communication cable when eight shells exploded nearby causing the putty in his pocket to burn into his leg. A friend who had seen the incident reported MacDonald as dead, which was later corrected when MacDonald returned to base alive.

When World War II commenced, MacDonald was keen to travel overseas to once again fight for his country, and therefore re-enlisted in the army. However, after the army decided he was too old to see action, MacDonald was relegated to the Victoria Barracks in Sydney where he served five years undertaking clerical work and providing administrative support during World War II.

== Honours ==
MacDonald was awarded the Military Medal for his "conspicuous gallantry and devotion to duty in action" during the events on 12 October 1917.

In addition to the Military Medal, MacDonald was also awarded the Legion of Honour. The French ambassador to Australia Dominique Girard flew to Tasmania in 1998 to personally present MacDonald with the Legion of Honour.

== Death ==
MacDonald died from pneumonia on 23 August 2003, two months after celebrating his 107th birthday. Prior to his death, he had been admitted to Northwest Regional Hospital in Burnie after breaking his hip in a fall.

MacDonald's death prompted tributes from various Australian leaders including Prime Minister John Howard.

Premier of Tasmania, Jim Bacon announced that MacDonald would be honoured with a state funeral.

The state funeral was held in Ulverstone, where hundreds of people gathered to pay their respects to the World War I veteran.

== Legacy ==
MacDonald along with fellow Tasmanian World War I veteran (and also the final surviving Australian Gallipoli digger) Alec Campbell were posthumously honoured on a commemorative plaque which was unveiled in front of two trees that had been planted in 1926. MacDonald's great-niece and Campbell's widow were present at the unveiling. MacDonald and Campbell had only met each other for the first time when they were both aged in their 100's at a Remembrance Day function in Hobart in 2001.

MacDonald was also posthumously honoured with the naming of the Frank MacDonald Memorial Prize, an annual essay-based competition for Tasmanian Year 9 students which is aimed to promote and preserve the meaning of the Anzac spirit.
