= Howth, Tasmania =

Howth Tasmania
- Coordinates: 41°05′38″S 146°00′09″E
- Population: 61 (SAL 2021)
- Postcode(s): 7316
- Location: 12 km (7 mi) SE of Burnie
- LGA(s): Central Coast
- Region: North West Tasmania
- State electorate(s): Braddon
- Federal division(s): Braddon
Localities around Howth:
Heybridge	Bass Strait	Sulphur Creek
Heybridge	Howth	Sulphur Creek
Cuprona	Sulphur Creek	Sulphur Creek

Howth is a locality and small rural community in the local government area of Central Coast, in the North West region of Tasmania. It is located about 12 kilometres (7.5 mi) south-east of the town of Burnie. Bass Strait forms part of the northern boundary of the locality. The 2021 census recorded a population of 61 for the state suburb of Howth.

== History ==
The locality was named in 1900 for Howth, a village and outer suburb of Dublin in Ireland, the home town of an early settler family.

== Road infrastructure ==
The C118 route (Nine Mile Road) intersects with the Bass Highway at the north-eastern extremity of the locality, from where it runs through to the south and provides access to many other localities.
