= Central Coast Council (Tasmania) =

- Local government area
- Interactive map of Central Coast Council
- Coordinates: 41.28°S 146.041°E
- Country: Australia
- State: Tasmania
- Region: Ulverstone and Penguin area
- Established: 2 April 1993
- Council seat: Ulverstone

Government
  - Mayor: Cheryl Fuller
  - State electorate: Braddon
  - Federal division: Braddon

Area
  - Total: 933 km^{2} (360 sq mi)

Population
  - Total: 22,760 (2021)
  - Density: 24.394/km^{2} (63.18/sq mi)
LGAs around Central Coast Council
Bass Strait	Bass Strait	Bass Strait
Burnie	Central Coast Council	Devonport
Waratah-Wynyard	Kentish	Kentish

Central Coast Council is a local government body in Tasmania, situated in the north-west of the state between Burnie and Devonport. Central Coast is classified as an urban local government area and has a population of 22,760, Ulverstone and Penguin are the two primary towns of the region.

== History and attributes ==
The Central Coast Council was established on 2 April 1993 after the amalgamation of the Penguin and Ulverstone municipalities.

Central Coast is classified as urban, regional and small (URS) under the Australian Classification of Local Governments.

The municipal boundaries are the Blythe River in the west, Braddons Lookout Road in the east and Black Bluff in the south. The Central Coast includes the tourist destinations Leven Canyon and Black Bluff, as well as a number of rural areas such as Upper Castra.

== Council ==
=== Current composition ===
Name	Position	Party affiliation
Cheryl Fuller	Mayor/Councillor	Independent
John Beswick	Deputy Mayor/Councillor	Independent
Garry Carpenter	Councillor	Independent
Amanda Diprose	Councillor	Independent
Casey Hiscutt	Councillor	Independent
Sophie Lehmann	Councillor	Independent
Michael Smith	Councillor	Independent
Kate Wylie	Councillor	Independent
Phillip Viney	Councillor	Independent

=== 2022 election results ===
2022 Tasmanian local elections: Central Coast
Party	Candidate	Votes	%	±%
Independent	Cheryl Fuller (elected)	2,611	17.97	
Independent Liberal	Garry Carpenter (elected)	2,386	16.42	
Independent	Casey Hiscutt (elected)	822	5.66	
Independent Labor	Amanda Diprose (elected)	716	4.93	
Independent	Michael Smith (elected)	706	4.86	
Independent	John Beswick (elected)	647	4.45	
Independent	Philip Viney (elected)	606	4.17	
Greens	Darren Briggs	602	4.14	
Independent	Kate Wylie (elected)	536	3.69	
Independent JLN	Sophie Lehmann (elected)	521	3.59	
Independent	Patrick Fabian	517	3.56	
Independent	Greg Wing	471	3.24	
Independent	Ariele Ackland	429	2.95	
Independent	Andrew van Rooyen	424	2.92	
Independent	Damien McCulloch	387	2.66	
Independent	Micheline Andrews	352	2.42	
Independent	Stephen Jackson	300	2.06	
Independent	Bill Hutcheson	257	1.77	
Independent	Lyndon O'Neil	207	1.42	
Independent	Dianne Kurrle	206	1.42	
Independent	Matt Kelly	150	1.03	
Independent	Gaye Bryan	139	0.96	
Independent	Justine Brooks	137	0.94	
Independent	Darrell Jeffrey	129	0.89	
Independent	Garth Johnston	115	0.79	
Independent	Adam Moller	83	0.57	
Independent	David Robinson	73	0.50	
Total formal votes		14,529	95.75	
Informal votes		645	4.25	
Turnout		15,174	85.25	

== Localities ==
Locality	Census population 2016	Census population 2021	Reason
Blythe Heads			Incl. in Heybridge
Heybridge	430	339	Includes Blythe Heads
Howth	54	61	
Sulphur Creek	629	631	
Preservation Bay	74	100	
Penguin	3849	4132	Includes Carmantown
Cuprona	120	140	
West Pine	138	142	
Carmantown			Incl. in Penguin
West Ulverstone	4191	4515	
Ulverstone	6465	6653	
Turners Beach	1715	1966	
Camena	26	24	
Leith	415	504	
Forth	711	738	
Kindred	234	214	
Upper Castra	77	85	
Castra	51	41	
Nietta	64	63	
South Nietta	9	N/A	
South Preston	7	21	
Preston	150	149	Includes Warringa
Loongana	20	16	
Loyetea	25	20	
Heka			Incl. in Gunns Plains
Warringa			Incl. in Preston
Gunns Plains	171	195	Includes Heka
Riana	326	313	
South Riana	214	214	
Sprent	138	160	
Spalford	59	55	
Abbotsham	95	89	
Gawler	622	703	
North Motton	405	425	
Total	21,484	22,708	
	(122)	(82)	Variance
Local government total	21,362	22,760	Gazetted Central Coast local government area

=== Not in above list ===
- Middlesex

== See also ==
- List of local government areas of Tasmania
