= Dial Range =

Mountain range in Tasmania, Australia

Coordinates: 41°12′S 146°02′E

The Dial Range is a small mountain range in northwest Tasmania, south of the town of Penguin near the coast. It extends about 14 km (9 mi) north to south and 4-5 km west to east. It is bordered on the east and south by the Leven River, with the Gunns Plains to the south.

There are approximately 52 km^{2} (20 sq mi) of state owned land in the range. Of this, 43.54 km^{2} (17 sq mi) is state forest and forest reserve managed by Forestry Tasmania. Two smaller areas are managed by the Parks and Wildlife Service, the Mount Montgomery and Ferndene state reserves. The remaining 5.07 km^{2} (2 sq mi), comprising two land parcels contiguous with the reserves, have been proposed as a Nature Recreation Area.

The Dial Range is close to the small town of Penguin.

Mountains in the range, from north to south, are:

- Mount Montgomery
- Mount Dial
- Mount Gnomon
- Mount Duncan
- Mount Riana
- Mount Lorymer
