= Gunns Plains, Tasmania =

Gunns Plains Tasmania
- Coordinates: 41°17′S 146°3′E
- Population: 195 (SAL 2021)
- Postcode(s): 7315
- LGA(s): Central Coast Council
- State electorate(s): Braddon
- Federal division(s): Braddon

Gunns Plains, sometimes written as Gunn's Plains, is a small town located 20 km south of Ulverstone on the north-west coast of Tasmania, Australia.

The 2021 census recorded a population of 195 for the state suburb of Gunns Plains. The Leven River winds slowly through its pastures that support a variety of grazing stock. Agricultural endeavours are also very successful, benefiting from rich red volcanic soil. The town was named after botanist Ronald Campbell Gunn, who discovered the valley in 1860.

The community was involved in a significant number of men going to the First World War.

The valley has a vineyard, Leven Valley Vineyard, that producesPinot and Chardonnay.

The main attractions of Gunns Plains are the limestone caves, of which over one hundred and fifty have been discovered. The Tasmania Parks and Wildlife Service administers Gunns Plains Cave, which is open to the public with daily tours.

Its post office opened on 3 April 1900 and closed in 1974.

== Wing's Wildlife Park ==
An attraction in the area is the 'Wing's Wildlife Park' which has local animals such as Tasmanian devils, quolls, koalas, wombats, echidnas, bandicoots, possums, squirrel gliders and many macropods (kangaroos, wallabies, bettongs); as well as animals from overseas including bison, water buffalo, camel, donkey, deer, capybaras, meerkats and capuchin, macaque and marmoset monkeys. Additionally number of other animals including birds and reptiles such as ostrich, emu, eagles, falcons, owls, cockatoos, snakes and lizards.
