= River Leven (Tasmania) =

River in Tasmania, Australia

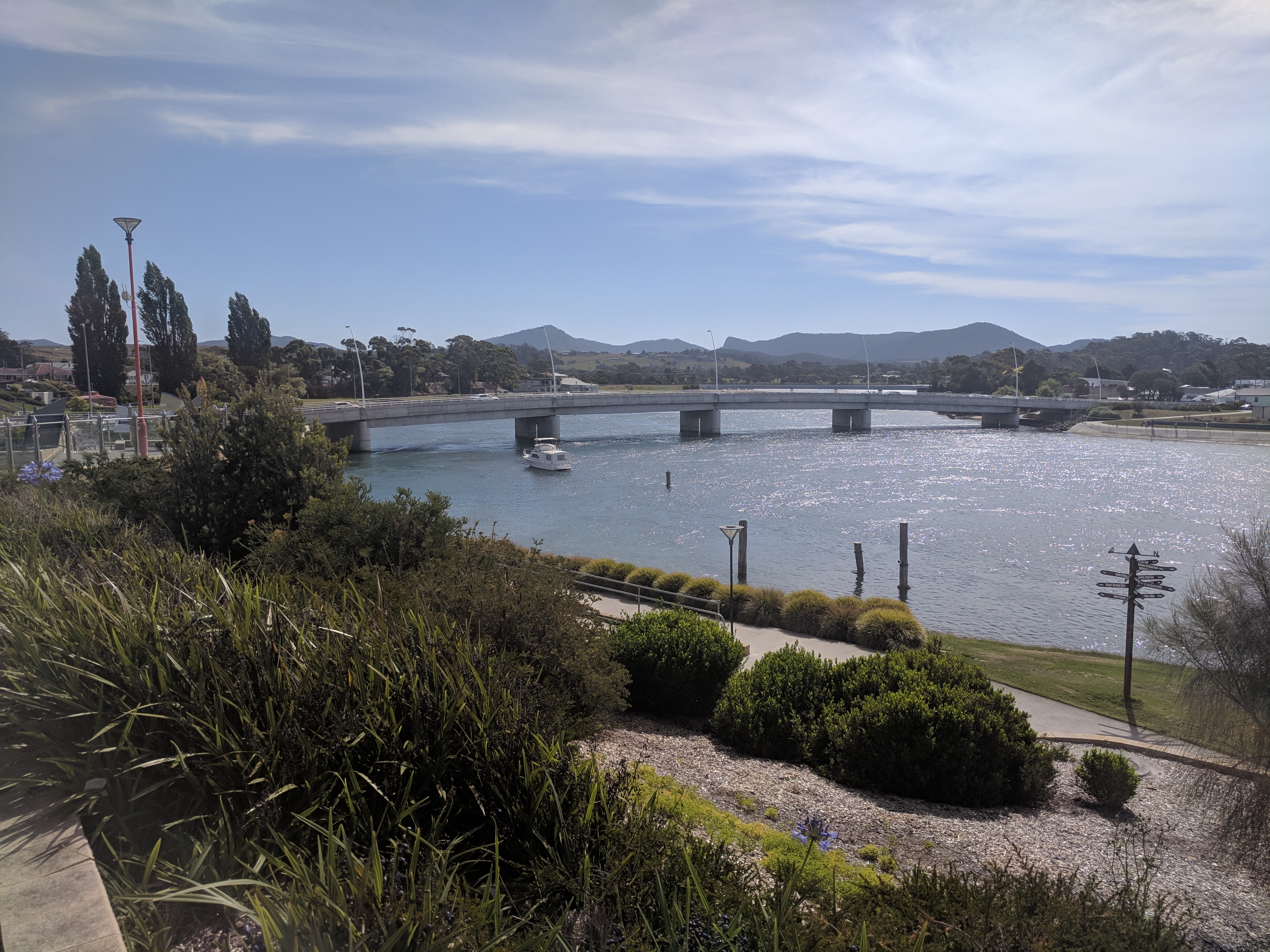

- Location of the River Leven mouth in Tasmania

Location
- Country: Australia
- State: Tasmania
- Region: North-west

Physical characteristics
- Source: Vale of Belvoir Conservation Area
  - location: near Cradle Mountain
  - coordinates: 41°31′23″S 145°52′31″E
  - elevation: 946 m (3,104 ft)
- Mouth: Bass Strait
  - location: Ulverstone / West Ulverstone midpoint
  - coordinates: 41°08′54″S 146°10′07″E
  - elevation: 0 m (0 ft)
- Length: 99.3 km (61.7 mi)

The River Leven is a perennial river for most of its length, located in the north-western region of Tasmania, Australia. It was named by the Van Diemen's Land Company after the River Leven in Scotland. (Note: There is more than one River Leven in Scotland. The best-known are River Leven, Dunbartonshire and River Leven, Fife.)

== Location and features ==
The river rises in the Vale of Belvoir Conservation Area near Cradle Mountain, passes through Leven Canyon, and flows generally north into Bass Strait at Ulverstone. The river descends 946 metres (3,104 ft) over its 99.3-kilometre (61.7 mi) course.

== See also ==
- List of rivers of Australia § Tasmania
