= Blythe River (Tasmania) =

River in Tasmania, Australia

Blythe
- Location of the Blythe River mouth in Tasmania

Location
- Country: Australia
- State: Tasmania
- Region: North-west

Physical characteristics
- Source: Mount Tor
  - location: near Rabbit Plain
  - coordinates: 41°14′55″S 147°51′28″E
  - elevation: 685 m (2,247 ft)
- Mouth: Emu Bay, Bass Strait
  - location: Heybridge
  - coordinates: 41°04′41″S 145°58′50″E
  - elevation: 0 m (0 ft)
- Length: 61 km (38 mi)

The Blythe River is a perennial river in the north-western region of Tasmania, Australia.

== Location and features ==
The river rises near Rabbit Plain on the slopes of Mount Tor and flows generally north into Emu Bay in Bass Strait, at Heybridge, near Burnie. The river descends 685 metres (2,247 ft) over its 61-kilometre (38 mi) course.

The local economy relies on mining and recreational fishing.

== See also ==
- List of rivers of Australia § Tasmania
