= Penguin, Tasmania =

Penguin
- Town
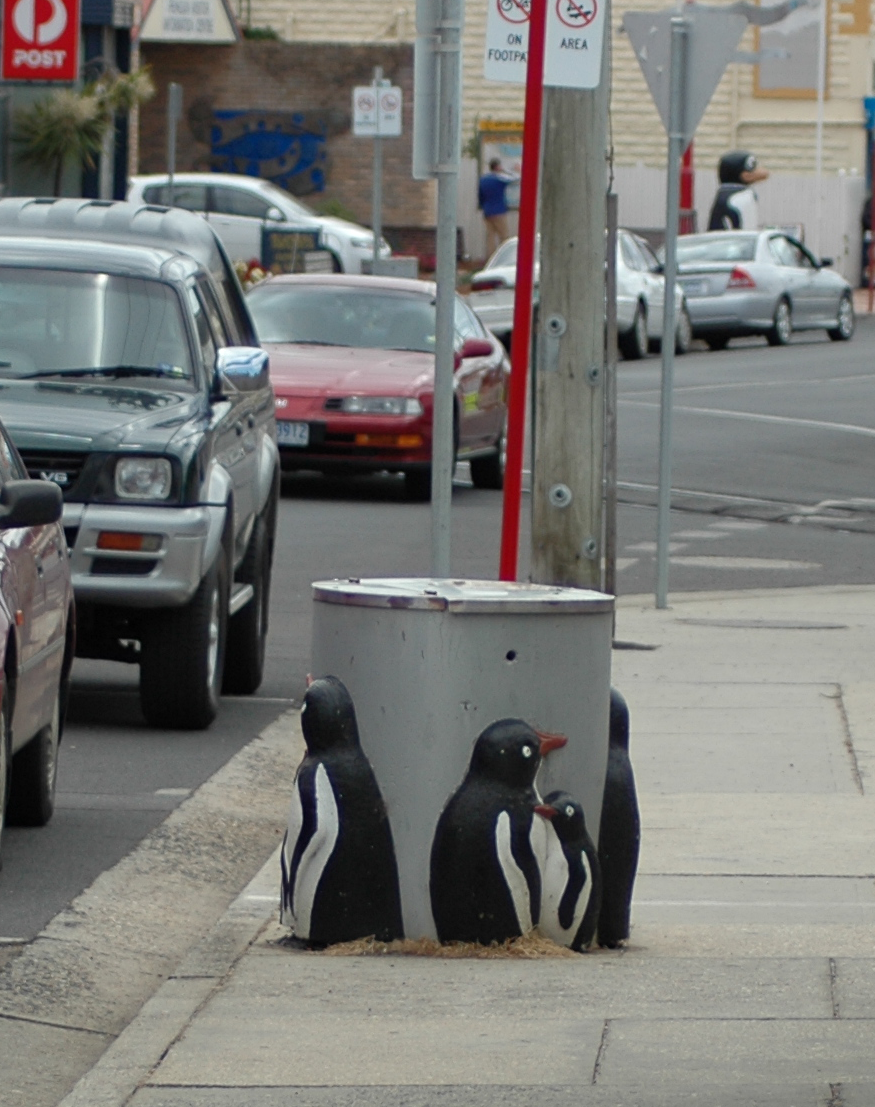
- Penguin-themed rubbish bin in the town

- Coordinates: 41°7′0″S 146°4′15″E
- Country: Australia
- State: Tasmania
- LGA: Central Coast Council
- Location: 283 km (176 mi) NW of Hobart; 128 km (80 mi) NW of Launceston; 29 km (18 mi) W of Devonport
- Established: 1861

Government
  - State electorate: Braddon
  - Federal division: Braddon

Population
  - Total: 4,132 (2021 census)
- Postcode: 7316

Penguin is a town on the north coast of Tasmania, Australia. It is in the Central Coast Council local government area and on the Bass Highway, between Burnie and Ulverstone. At the 2021 census, Penguin had a population of 4,132.

== History ==
Penguin was first settled in 1861 as a timber town, and proclaimed on 25 October 1875. The area's dense bushland and easy access to the sea led to Penguin becoming a significant port town, with large quantities of timber shipped across Bass Strait to Victoria, where the 1850s gold rushes were taking place. The town was named by the botanist Ronald Campbell Gunn for the little penguin rookeries that are common along the less populated areas of the coast.

Sulphur Creek Post Office opened on 1 January 1867 and was replaced by the Penguin Creek office in 1868. The latter office was renamed Penguin in 1895.

Penguin was one of the last districts settled along the North West coast of Tasmania, possibly because of an absence of a river for safe anchorage. Nearly all travel in those days was by boat as bush made the land almost impenetrable. Many of the settlers probably emigrated from Liverpool via landing in Launceston then sailing west along the coast. Trade began when the wharf was built in 1870, allowing timber and potatoes to be exported. Penguin Silver Mine, along the foreshore slightly to the east of the town opened in 1870 but failed a year later. Neptune Mine, a tad further along, likewise failed. The rail from Ulverstone arrived in 1901, after which trade by sea declined. Passing of the Local Government Act in 1906 saw Tasmania divided into 48 Municipalities.

Penguin's first Council was elected in 1907, and the early stages of the municipal council were seen as benefiting the community. It was not until 1993 that the council was amalgamated with the Ulverstone council to form the Central Coast Council.

== Aboriginal history of the area ==
Approximately 12,000 years ago the peninsula/island of Tasmania was separated from mainland Australia. By European arrival in 1803 some 4,000-5,000 semi-nomadic Aboriginal people continued to manage this diverse and changing landscape, both responding to and manipulating the environment.

There were approximately 48 groups contained within nine socio-linguistic cohorts throughout Tasmania, speaking at least 4 distinct languages. The Northern people comprised 3 or possibly 4 groups, totaling 200-300 people. Their lands extended along the coast from Port Sorell to Penguin, inland to the SE corner of the Surrey Hills then East to the base of the Great Western Tiers near Quamby Bluff before turning north to the coast. Each winter the Northern people abandoned the cold of the Western Tiers and the flooded flats of the Meander Valley and traveled to the coast where they would congregate at sites such as Port Sorell at Panatana. The Northern people also had access to some of the most important ochre deposits in Tasmania. Excavations undertaken during the 1980s at the Gog Range mine, now called Toolumbunner, dated activity at this particular mine site back to the 15th century.

Colonisation of the North and North West of Van Diemen's Land was a particularly violent process - far away from the scrutiny of the colonial administration in Hobart. Thirty-two significant incidents of violence have been identified between 1826 and 1834, mostly taking place in the 1827/8 period. Twenty-eight people are known to have been captured by Colonial Authorities while eight were kidnapped by sealers. By 1847, when the 47 surviving Aborigines were transferred from Flinders Island to Oyster Cove, there were no Northern people left alive.

== Recent history ==
From 2005 to 2008, property developer Stephen Roche failed to expand his ownership of Penguin properties by attempting to purchase properties along the CBD beachfront on Main St with the aim of transforming them into four-storey commercial/residential opportunities. Support for development was mixed, which resulted in the developers foregoing all interest in the seaside town. One manoeuvre to circumvent development involved heritage-listing as much of the CBD as possible. Currently, Penguin has 30 heritage-listed sites.

In August 2020, a $6.5 million project to protect the Penguin foreshore began. The "Penguin Foreshore Remediation Project" will improve on the preexisting wave-break wall in place, and build new ones in areas not currently covered. The project will also include the building of access ramps and stairs, and a new car park at Lions Park. The project became a matter of urgency after (what is believed to be due to climate change) increased tides caused erosion on the old wall, and in some cases waves crashing onto the main road.

== Education ==
The sole public school in Penguin is Penguin District School. The kinder - year 12 school is currently located on two campuses at Ironcliffe Road. Construction on a new single campus, which will host all year levels, is expected to start in October 2020, costing $20 million. The redevelopment is expected to be complete by 2022. Penguin also has one of only two Seventh-day Adventist schools in Tasmania, called North West Christian School which caters for students from Kinder - Year 12.

== Attractions ==
The Big Penguin, which Penguin is home to, was made of ferro cement by the Goliath Cement Co of Railton and later coated with fibreglass, is located in the town's centre opposite the Post Office. Unveiled on 25 October 1975, it was erected to commemorate the centenary of the naming of the town. Concerns were raised in 2008 as to the possibility of asbestos contamination, but the Big Penguin was given the all clear. Rubbish bins on the streets of Penguin are decorated with ornamental cement fairy penguins.

The town itself sits at the base of the Dial Range, a small mountain range that also borders Riana and Gunns Plains. The four mountains with popular hiking trails within the Penguin vicinity include Mount Montgomery, Mount Dial, Mount Gnomon, and Mount Duncan. The Penguin District School four house names reference the mountains.

Penguin General Cemetery, over looks Bass Strait. Opened in the 1860s, it closed in 1977 and was heritage-listed in 2007.

The response to the cemetery's ongoing and widespread publicity was such that the Tasmanian Association for Hospice & Palliative Care (TAH&PC) funded the inaugural Penguin Twilight Celebration of the Dead - music among the tombstones. The event, held in the cemetery on 7 January 2015, was supported by the broader Penguin community. It marked the centenary of the cemetery's unknown burial. The celebration culminated in a butterfly release in the commemorative garden dedicated to the tens of unnamed babies in the cemetery. A fund-raising onsite formal long-table dinner was held in February 2016.

In 2018 Penguin launched its heritage sites and other attractions website. Recently the Penguin community dedicated a sculpture to its many unnamed children buried in the cemetery. Children of the World by Bruny Island artist Keith Smith stands in its small commemorative garden.

Each year since 2018 many shops in the CBD decorate themselves in pink; Pink Up Your Town is a fundraising activity for the McGrath Foundation. It also saw the community coming together to revitalise the foreshore under the 7-Day Makeover program, which has continually brightened the town since its inception. Local resident Shirley Good currently organises the event.

Installed in July 2020 is an art piece featuring a mosaic on the front and a word-jumble on the back, celebrating how marginalised people contribute to our communities, despite their struggles. It demonstrates how a sense of community can develop around marginalised people.

== Notable residents ==
- Amy Cure, a world champion track cyclist; winner of the 2014 Women's 25 km Points race in Cali, Colombia
- Alannah Hill, fashion designer, lived in Penguin during her childhood (1960s?-1979), as her parents owned a milk bar in the town
- Trevor Kaine, the second Chief Minister of the Australian Capital Territory, 1989–91, was born in Penguin in 1928
- Russell Robertson, former Australian rules footballer for the Melbourne Demons, attended Penguin High School from 1991 to 1994
- John Wilton, member for Broadmeadows in the Victorian Legislative Assembly from 1962 to 1985, was born in Penguin in 1925
- Associate Professor Daryl Guest, clinical researcher, academic and educator from the Department of Vision Sciences at The University of Melbourne, Chair of the Optometry Council of Australia and New Zealand Board (OCANZ) from 2007 to 2014

== Gallery ==
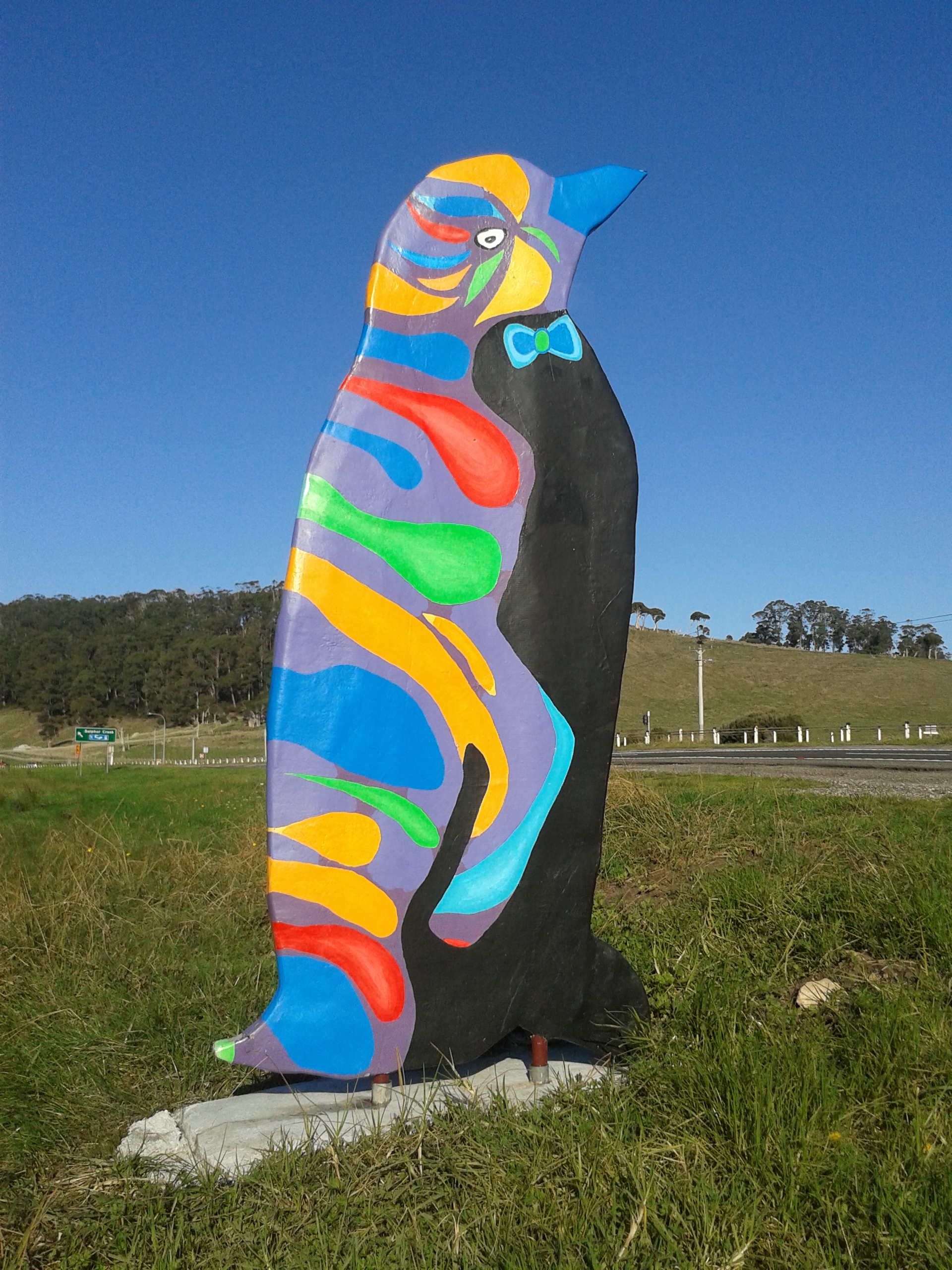
Pablo the Penguin, located approximately 7km away in the nearby locality of Howth.

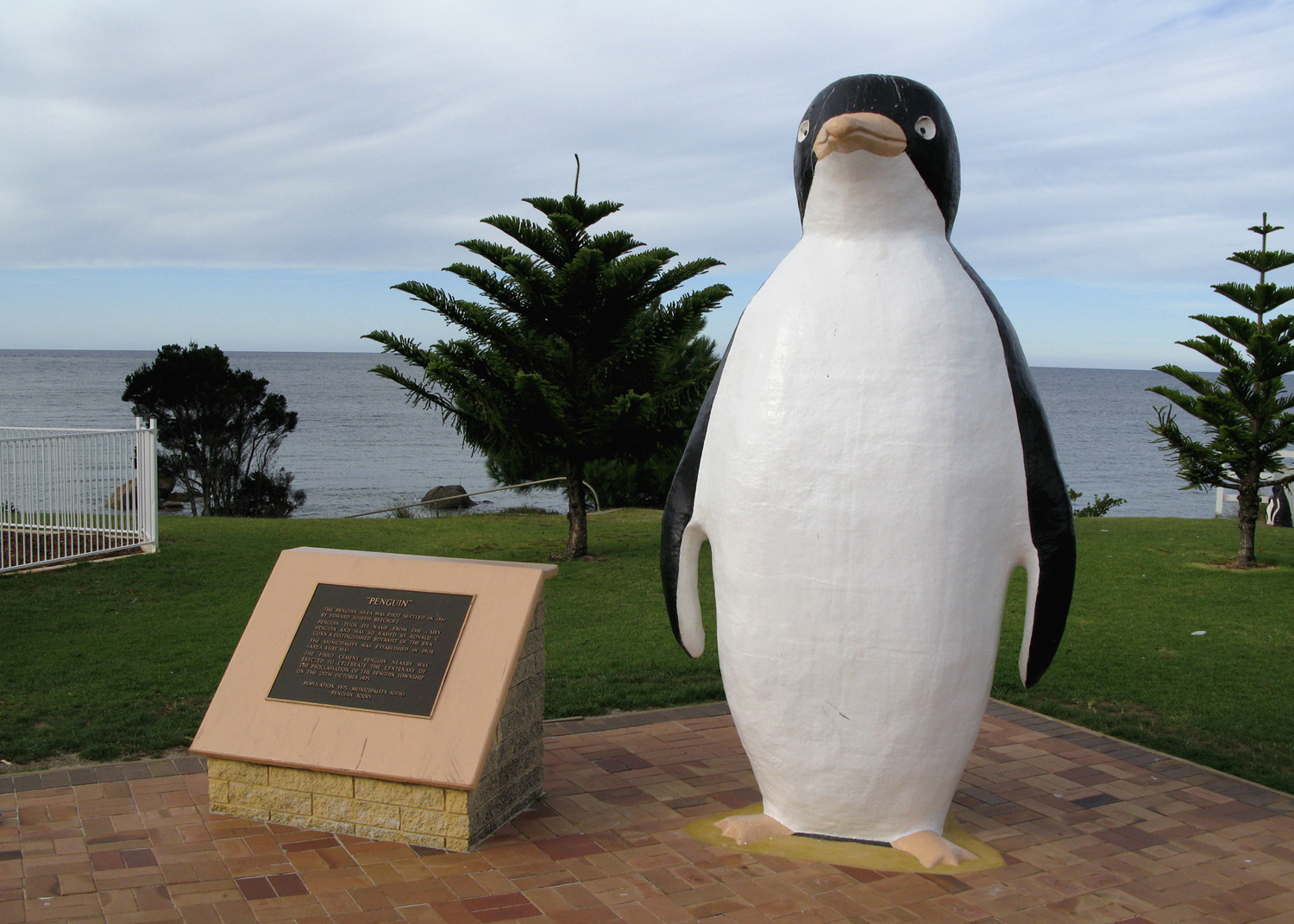
Penguin Big Penguin

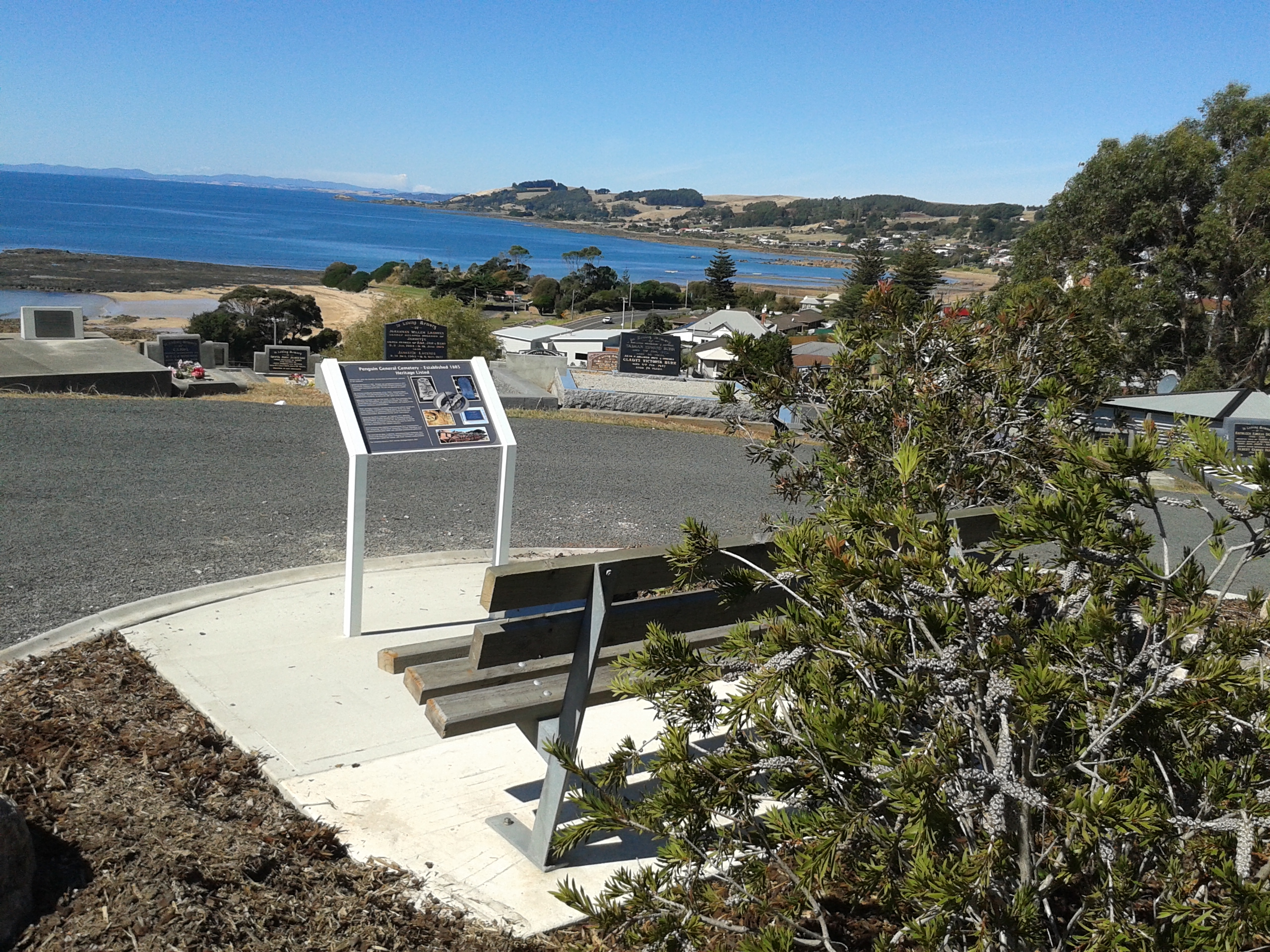
Penguin General Cemetery's interpretative signage

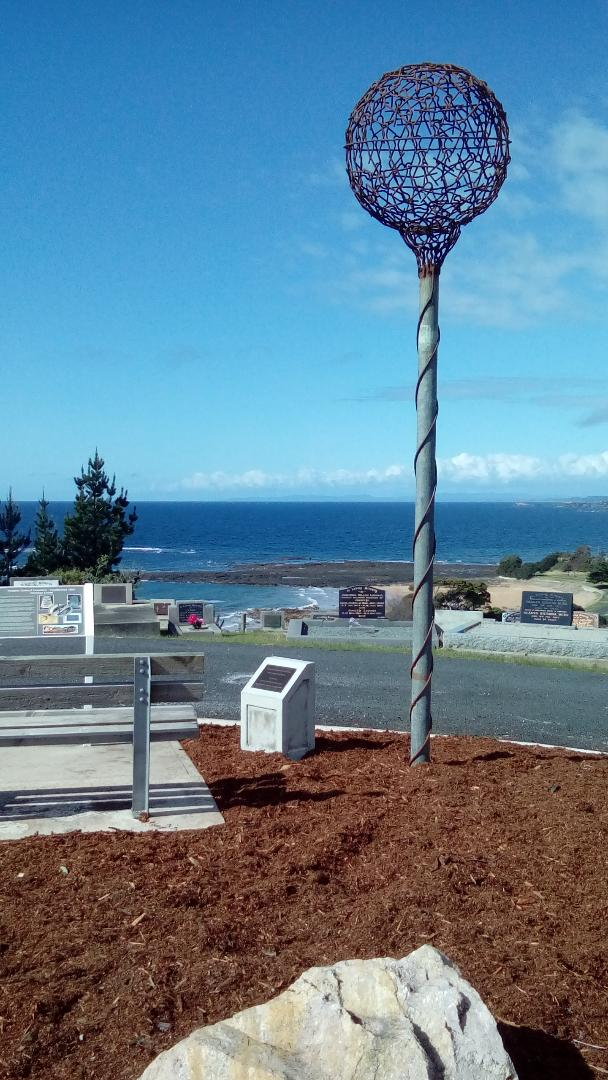
Children of the World sculpture

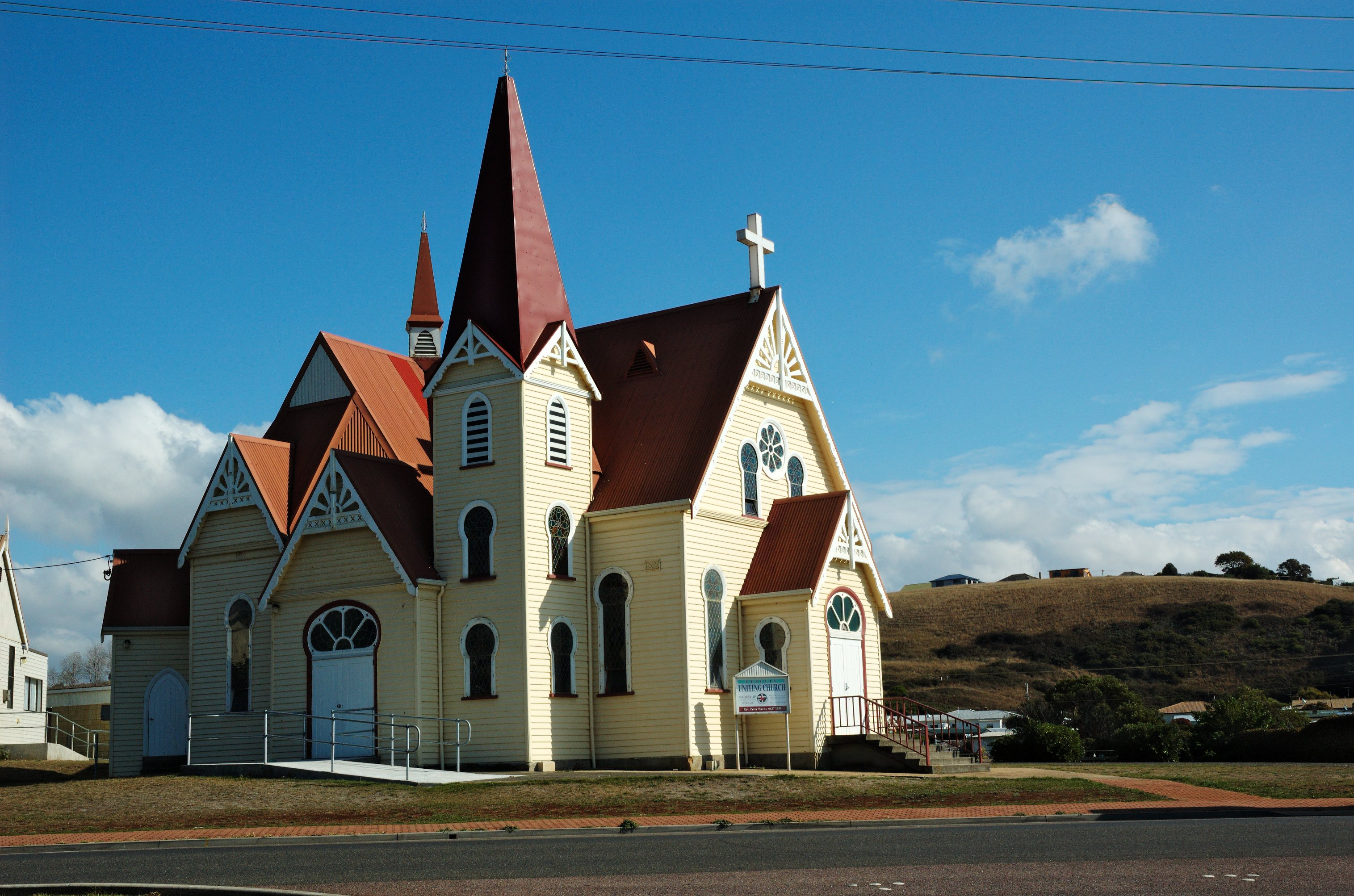
Uniting Church in Penguin

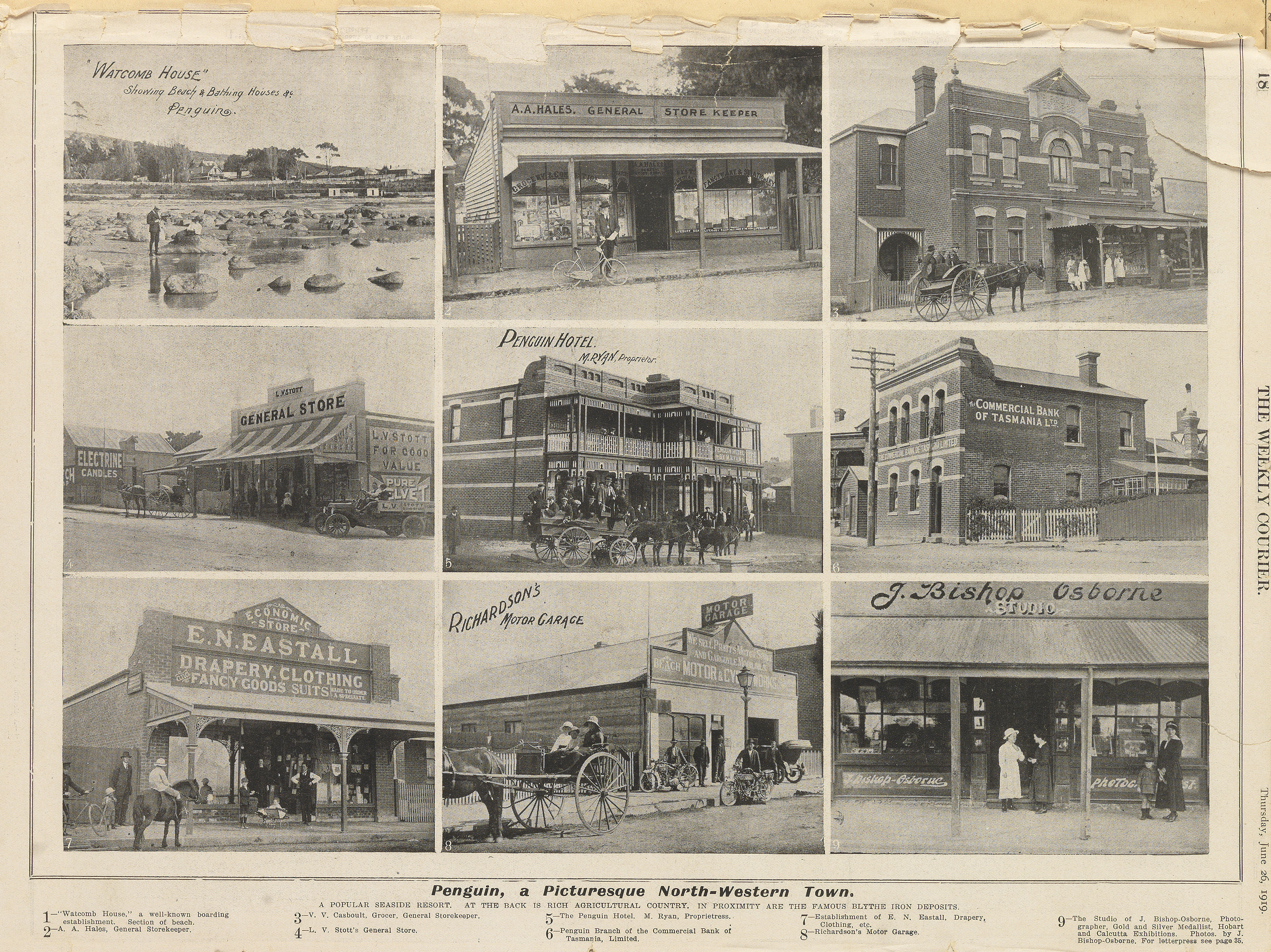
Penguin, Tasmania (1919)

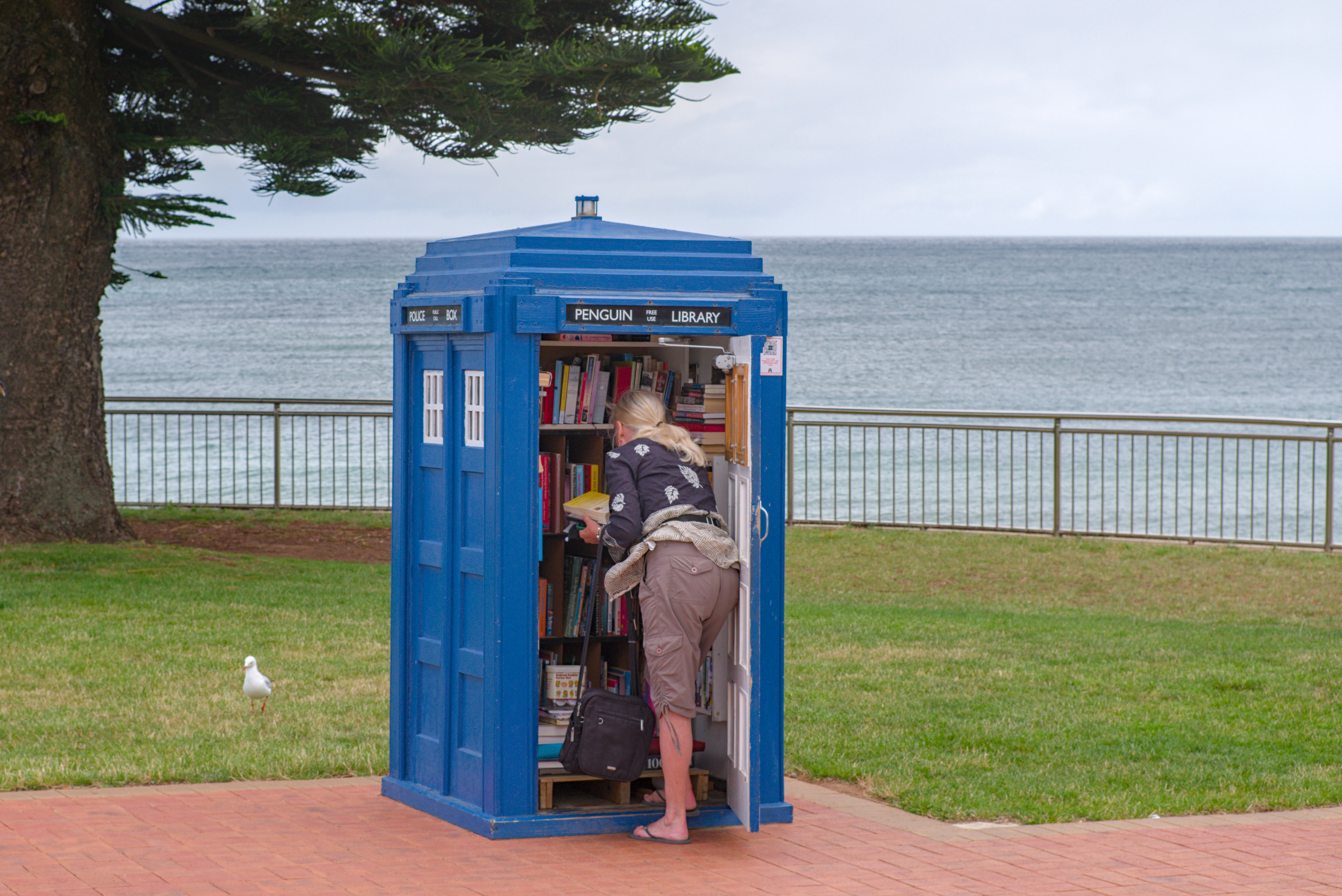
Tardis book exchange in Penguin

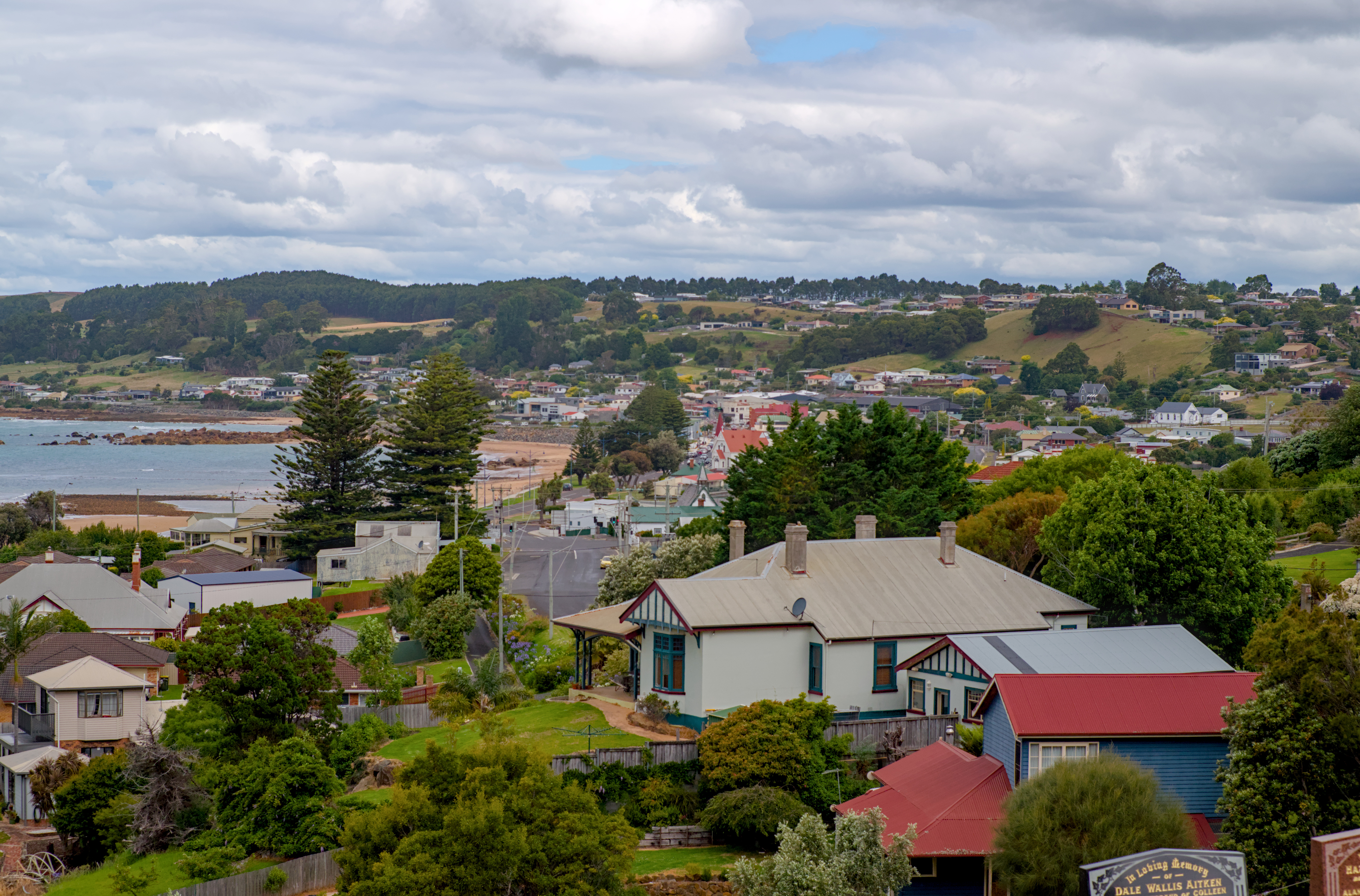
Looking over Penguin from the Penguin Heritage Cemetery Lookout

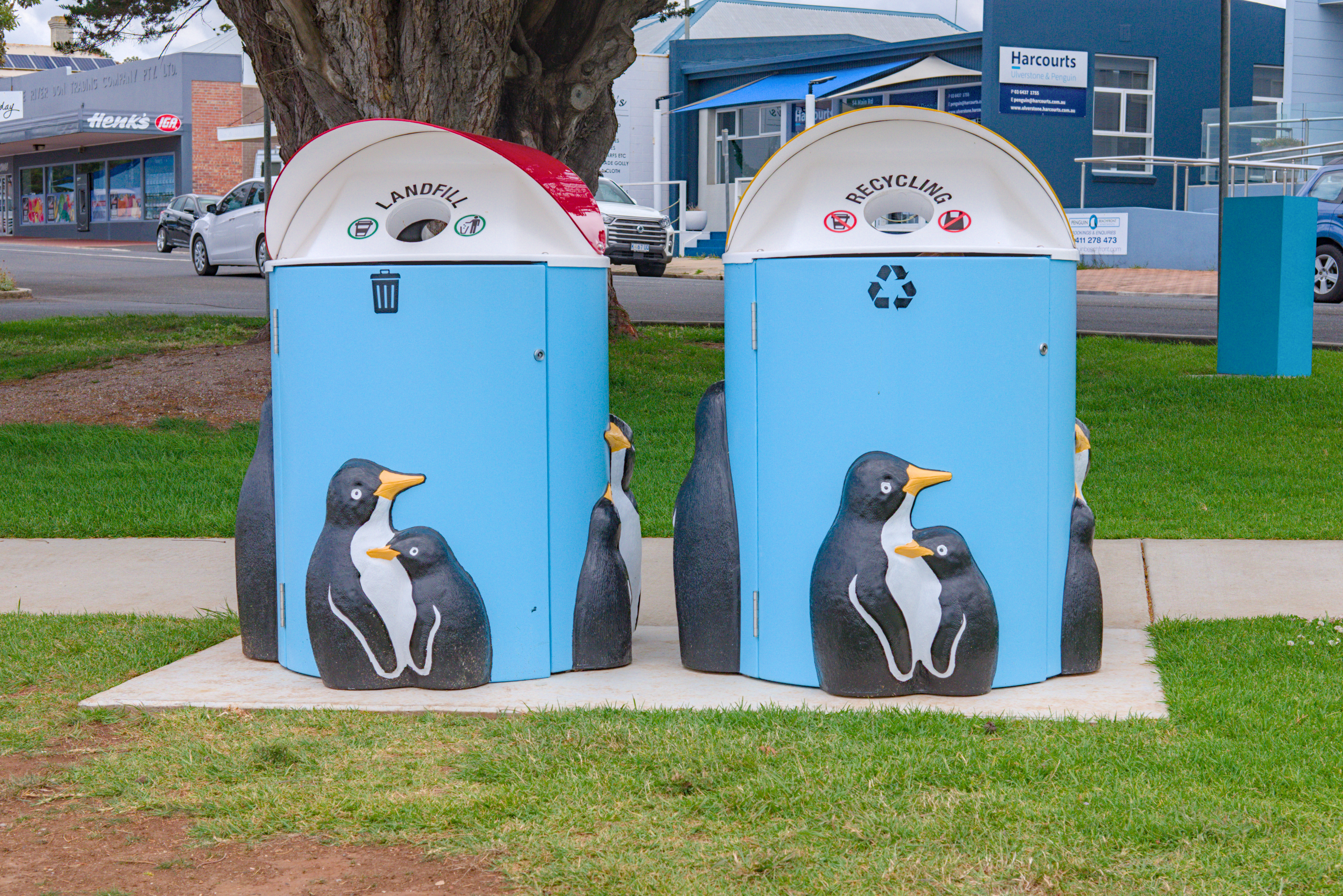
Public bins decorated with penguins

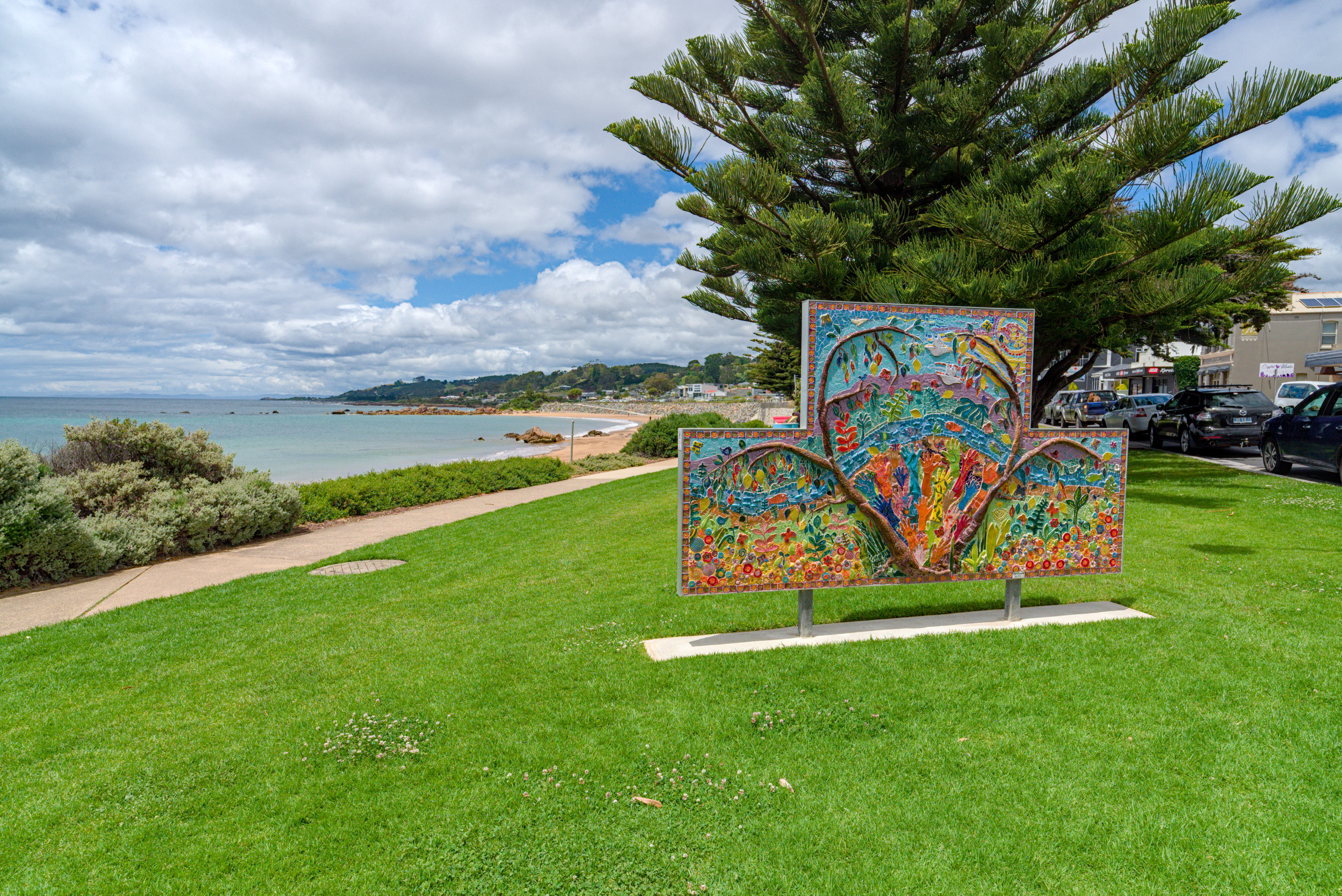
Art piece overlooking penguin beach path

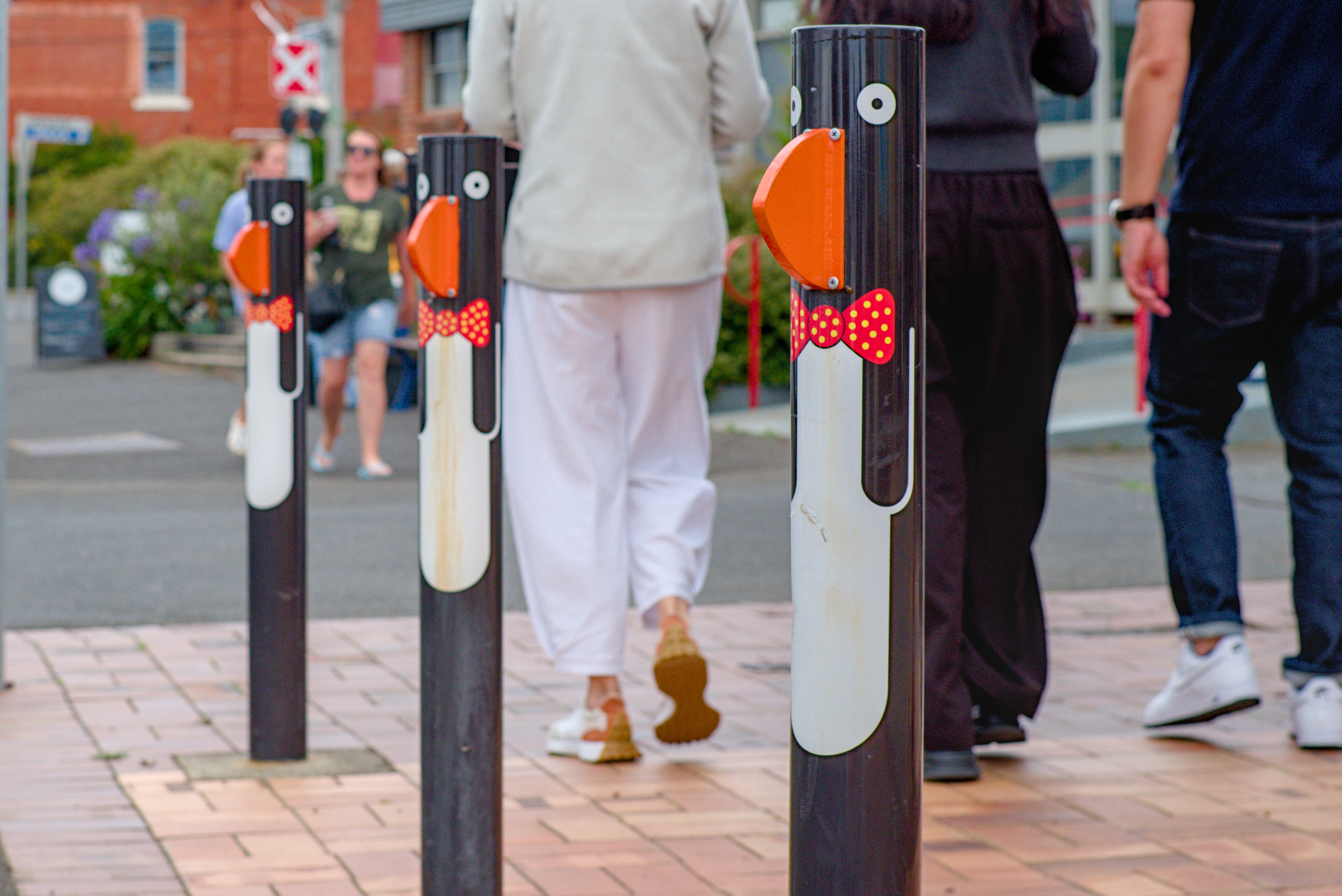
Penguin decorated posts in the streets of Penguin

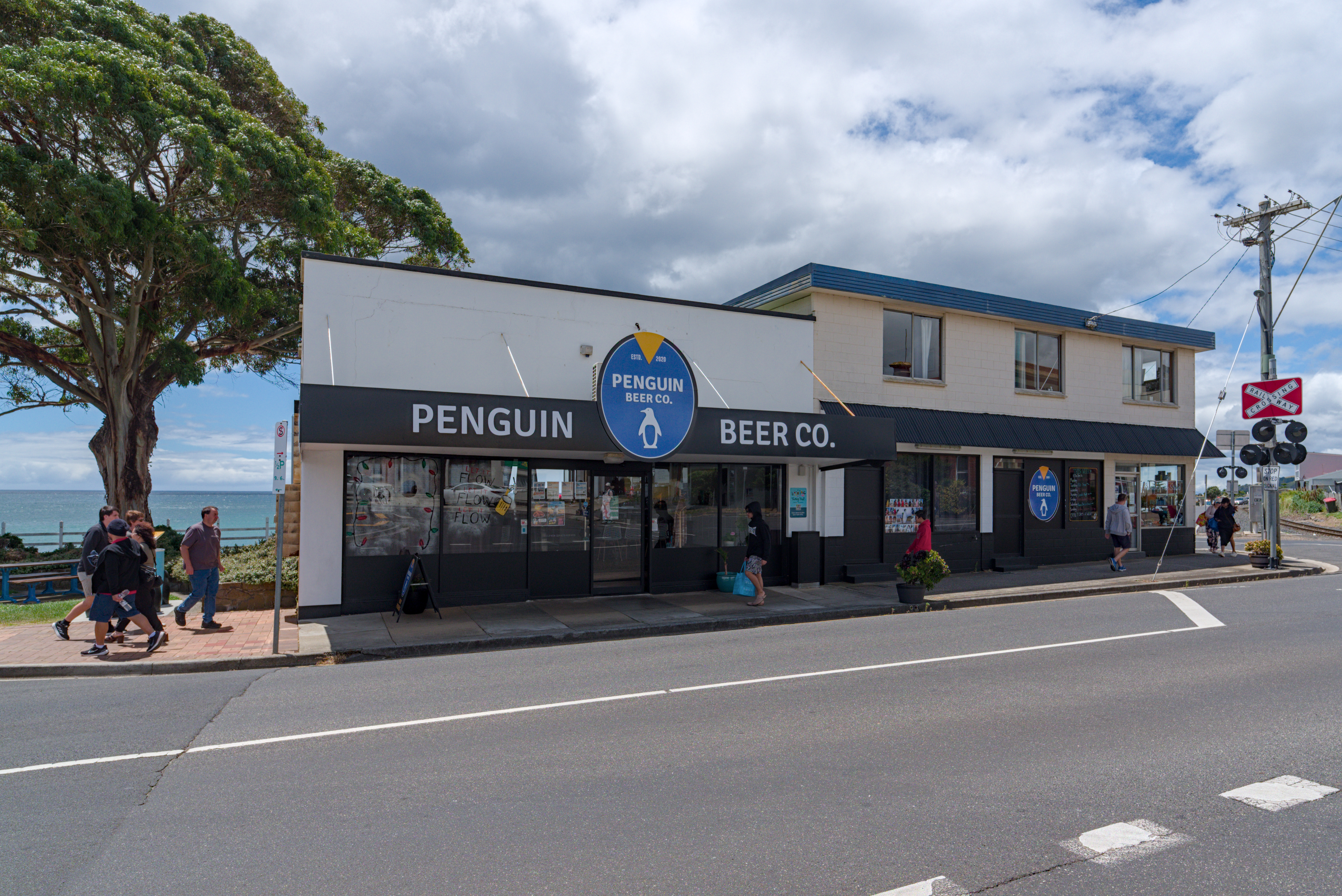
The Penguin Beer Co

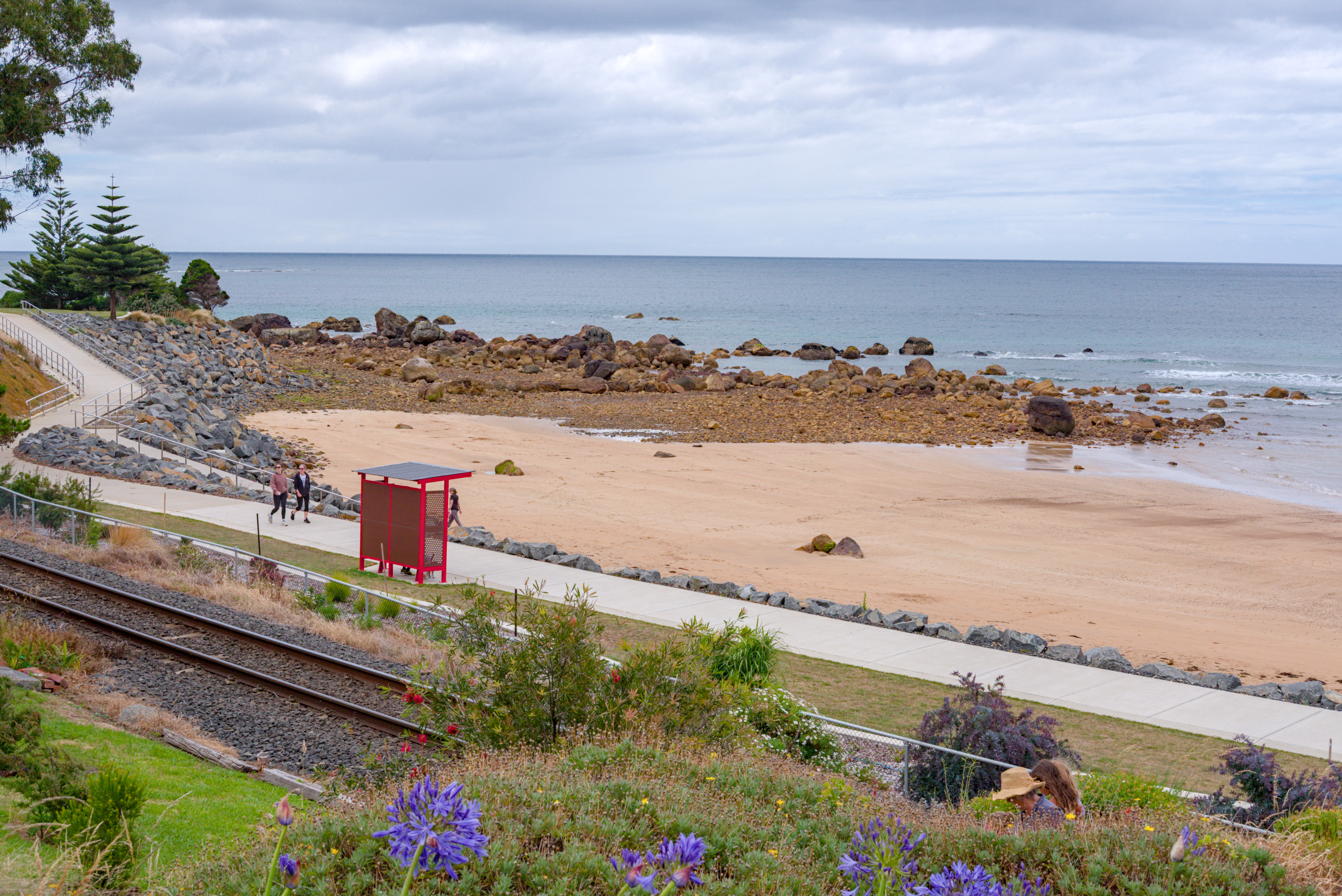
Penguin Beach with the train line in the foreground

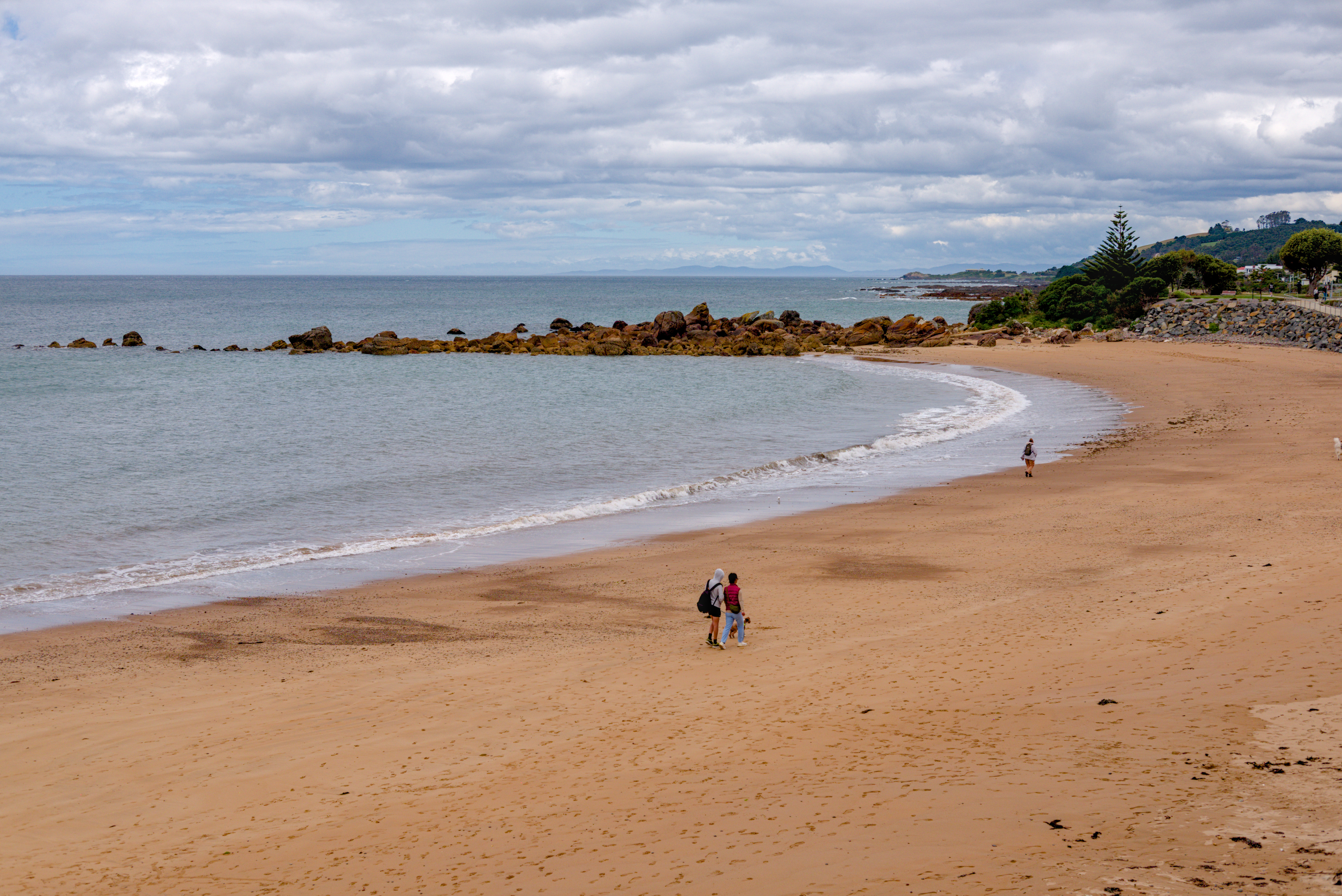
Penguin Beach

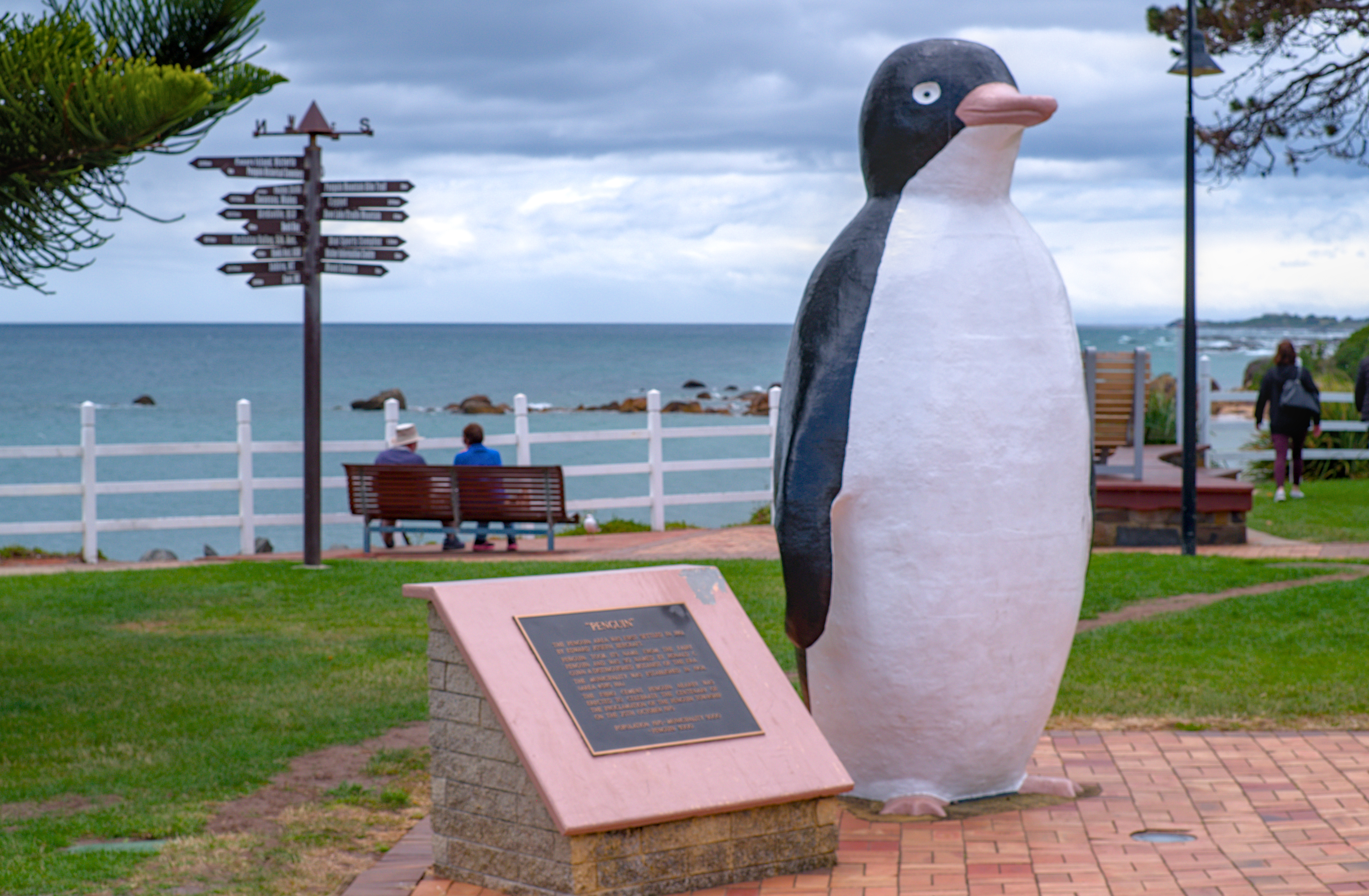
The Big Penguin
