= Ulverstone, Tasmania =

Ulverstone
- City
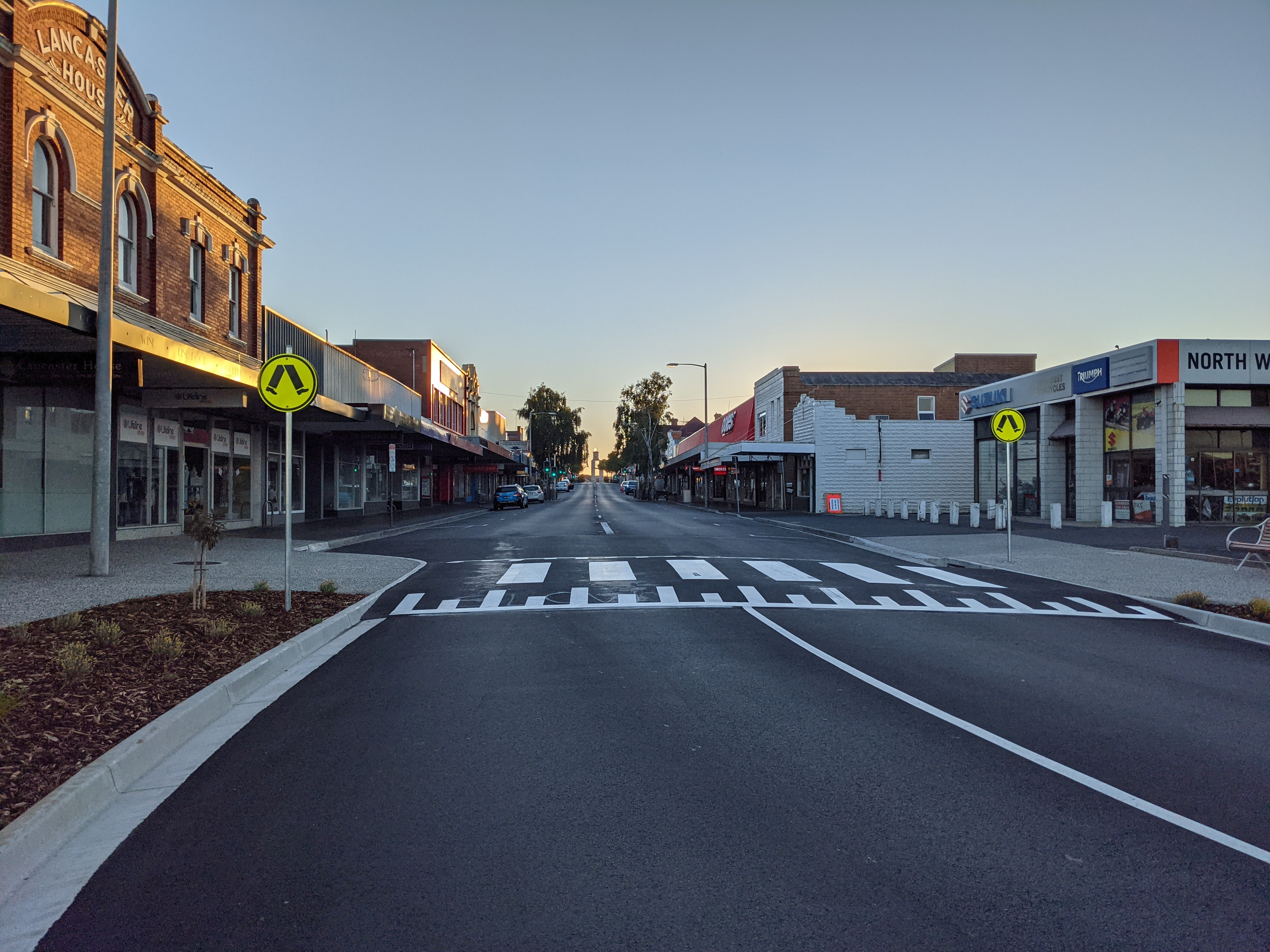
- Ulverstone's main street in January 2021

- Coordinates: 41°10′S 146°10′E
- Country: Australia
- State: Tasmania
- LGA: Central Coast Council
- Location: 18 km (11 mi) from Penguin; 21 km (13 mi) from Devonport; 28 km (17 mi) from Burnie; 117 km (73 mi) from Launceston

Government
  - State electorate: Braddon
  - Federal division: Braddon

Population
  - Total: 11,603 (2021)
- Postcode: 7315
- Mean max temp: 16.1 °C (61.0 °F)
- Mean min temp: 7.4 °C (45.3 °F)
- Annual rainfall: 936.5 mm (36.87 in)

Ulverstone is a city on the northern coast of Tasmania, Australia on the mouth of the River Leven, on Bass Strait. It is on the Bass Highway, 21 kilometres (13 mi) west of Devonport and 12 kilometres (7 mi) east of Penguin.

As of June 2021 Ulverstone had an urban population of 11,613, being the largest town in Tasmania. The town is a part of the municipality of the Central Coast Council, which also includes Penguin, Turners Beach, Leith, Gawler and surrounds, and Forth.

== History ==
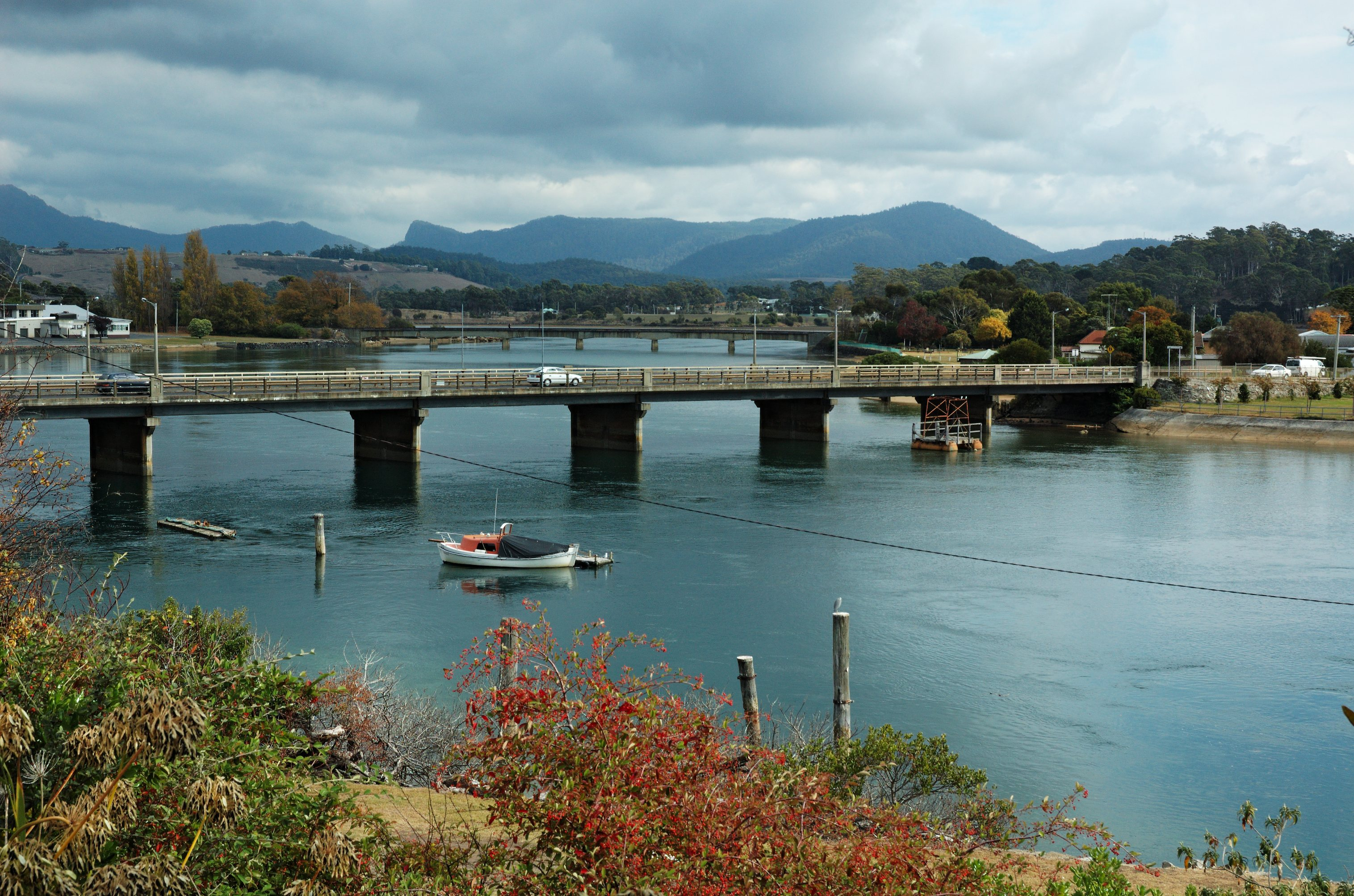
Old River Leven Bridge

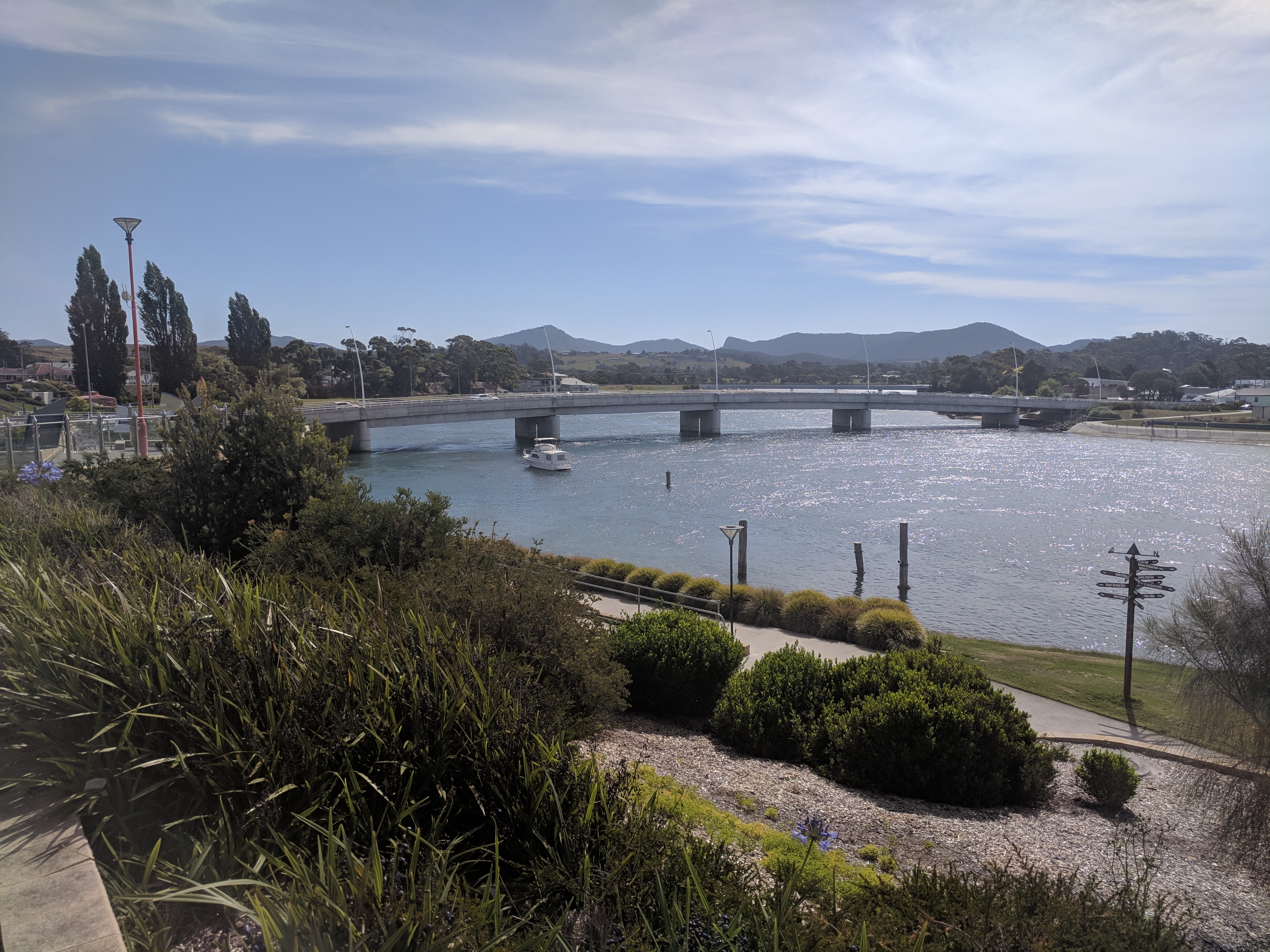
New River Leven Bridge

The town area was first settled by Europeans in 1848, when Andrew Risby, his wife Louisa and their five young children arrived to settle and develop farmland from what was mostly a thickly forested wilderness.

Andrew and Louisa arrived in Adelaide, South Australia in 1839 as a newly married couple from their ancestral town of Horsley, Gloucestershire in England. The first of their five children were born in Adelaide. Soon after the birth of their second child they moved to Tasmania. In 1841 they arrived at the Forth River where a young 19-year-old James Fenton had pioneered just prior to their arrival.

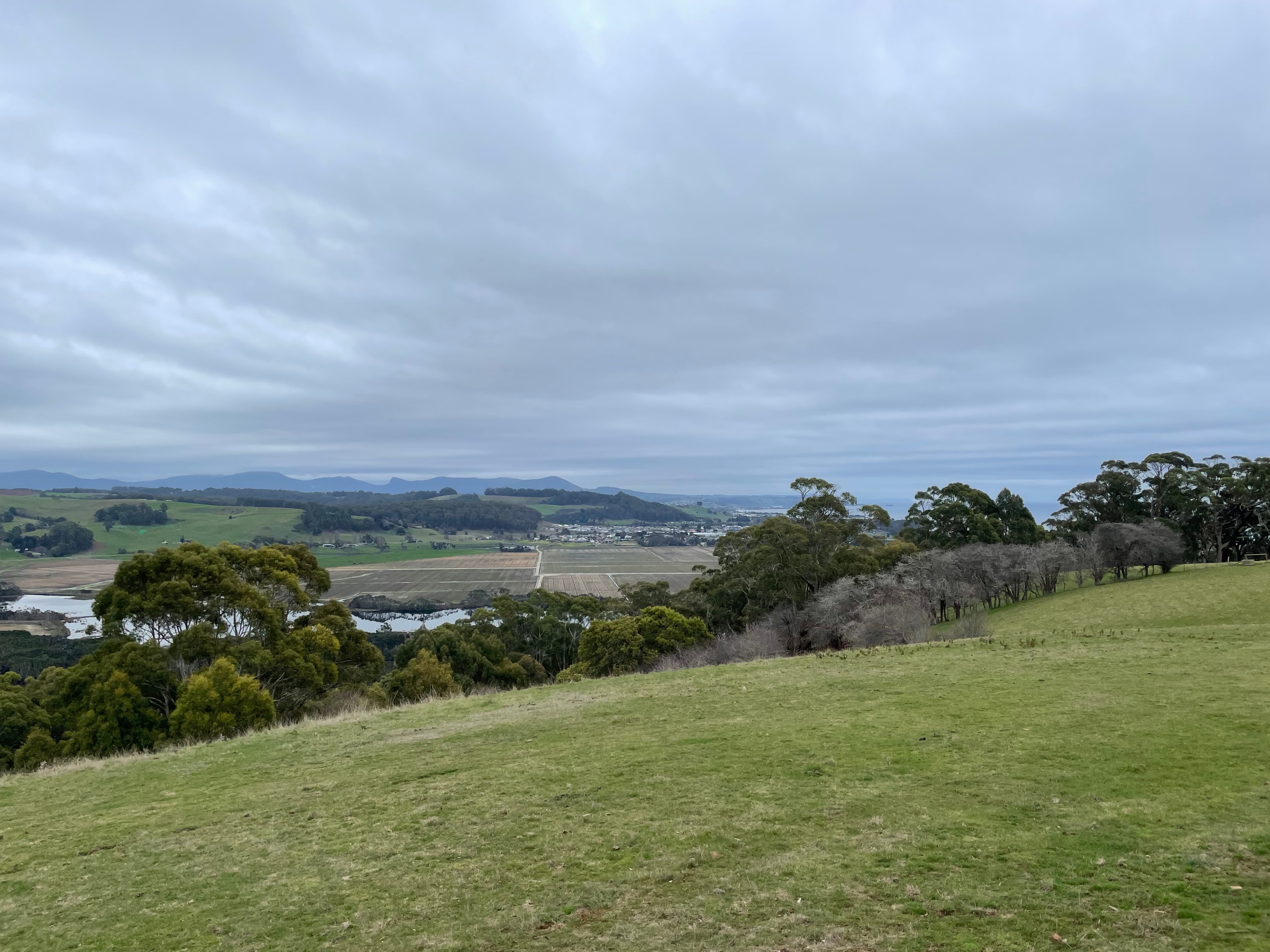
Looking west to the Dial Range across Ulverstone from Braddons Lookout, Central Coast Tasmania

After clearing land and subsistence farming for a few years, they were evicted from their "patch" after a land dispute with a wealthy speculator and moved westward. The district was, at that time, known as "the Leven" and recognised as a good source of quality timber with a similar climate to England. When their fifth child, Andrew Risby jnr. was two years old the Risby family moved and settled on a patch of land known as The Rises, at the south-eastern perimeter of the present day Ulverstone town boundary where they farmed for many years. Descendants of this pioneering family still live in the district.

During the 1850s, the district received a few new settlers but was also frequented by transient timber getters. The timber found ready markets in Melbourne, which desperately required good quality split timber during the Victorian gold rush. Until June 1854, land releases in the district were often purchased under "pre-emptive rights legislation" by distant purchasers whose intention was to keep the land for later sale at an increased price. With the repeal of that legislation, the conditions for settlers to take up residence improved.

The name Ulverstone is first known to have been used in 1854 when Hugh Ross McKay opened the Ulverstone store. Leven Post Office opened on 30 May 1857 and was renamed Ulverstone Post Office in 1881. Ulverstone was declared a town on 22 February 1861 by Governor H.E. Fox-Young.

Reliable rainfall and generally good quality soils favoured the development of agricultural pursuits. The early pioneers of the district struggled against great odds to secure their sustenance and ultimately develop an income from sale of their produce.

Ulverstone grew quite quickly during the 1890s, and the town has become a centralised location between the north-west coast's two cities, Burnie and Devonport. It is named after Ulverston in England, which also sits at the estuary of a river called Leven. Ulverston in England was spelled Ulverstone until late in the 19th century.

From 1915 until 1955, a branch railway ran from Ulverstone to Nietta, mostly carrying timber for the Burnie Pulp Mill.

=== Gay law reform ===
In December 1990, Ulverstone hosted anti-decriminalisation rallies, earning the moniker "Australia's most homophobic town" in media reports at the time. Although Tasmania was the last Australian jurisdiction to decriminalise male homosexuality in 1997, the state subsequently enacted comprehensive LGBTIQ+ legal protections. In 1998, Tasmania passed the Anti-Discrimination Act, which introduced landmark protections against discrimination based on sexual orientation and gender identity. In 2003, it became one of the first Australian states to establish a formal relationship register, granting same-sex couples legal rights equivalent to married couples under state law. The Central Coast Council has flown the Progress Pride flag above the council chambers since 2021. The town regularly hosts North West Tasmania's annual "Pride in the Park" events.

=== Redevelopment ===
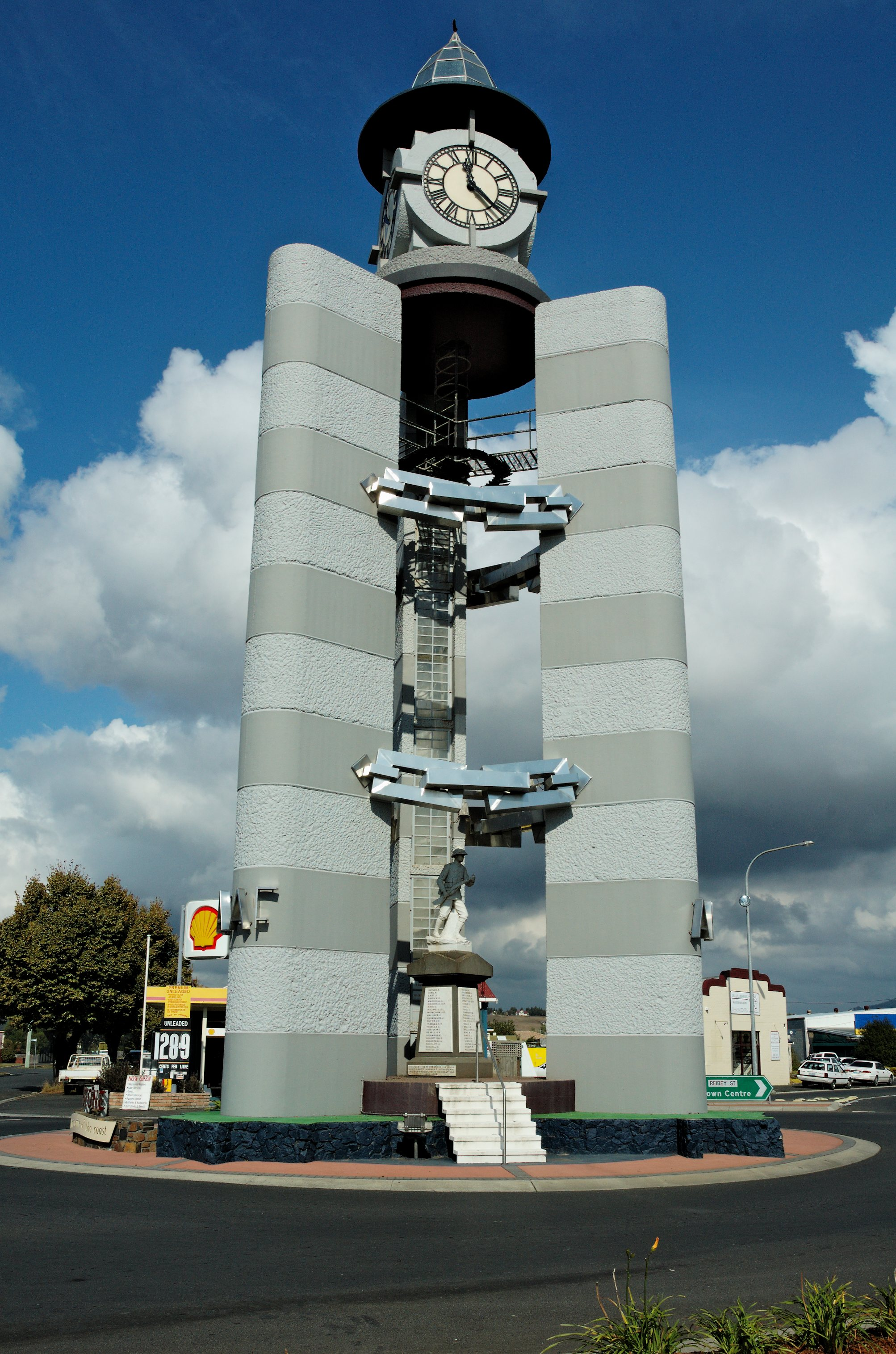
War memorial clock tower

The Central Coast Council redeveloped the area to increase tourism. 2010 saw the completion of a new basketball stadium, the Schweppes Arena. The arena holds around 1,100 people, cost $5.5 million to build and was completed just behind schedule. it overlooks the River Leven and is situated just behind the former stadium.

In 2011, the Leven Bridge was replaced by a new bridge. It was built by VEC Civil Engineering for approximately $6.5 million, with the Department of Infrastructure, Energy and Resources and the Central Coast Council funding the project. In June 2011 a walking track between Turners Beach and Ulverstone was opened.

A redevelopment of the wharf precinct was opened to the public on 17 November 2012.

== Climate ==
Ulverstone has a oceanic climate (Köppen: Cfb), with very mild, relatively dry summers and cool, rainy winters. Influence from the Bass Strait significantly cools the climate, whilst creating noticeable seasonal lag. Average maxima vary from 21.1 °C (70.0 °F) in February to 11.5 °C (52.7 °F) in July while average minima fluctuate between 11.6 °C (52.9 °F) in February and 3.6 °C (38.5 °F) in July. Mean average annual precipitation is moderate, 936.5 mm (36.87 in) spread between 147.3 precipitation days, and is concentrated in winter. Extreme temperatures have ranged from −3.2 °C (26.2 °F) on 17 July 1982 to 30.8 °C (87.4 °F) on 7 February 1967. Climate data was sourced from Forthside, a rural locality 9.3 kilometres (5.8 mi) east south-east of Ulverstone.

Climate data for Ulverstone (41º12'00"S, 146º16'12"E, 127 m AMSL) (1966-1996 normals and extremes, rainfall to 2024)
Month	Jan	Feb	Mar	Apr	May	Jun	Jul	Aug	Sep	Oct	Nov	Dec	Year
Record high °C (°F)	30.2 (86.4)	30.8 (87.4)	29.0 (84.2)	24.0 (75.2)	19.9 (67.8)	17.6 (63.7)	15.8 (60.4)	16.9 (62.4)	20.3 (68.5)	24.1 (75.4)	28.1 (82.6)	28.6 (83.5)	30.8 (87.4)
Mean daily maximum °C (°F)	20.6 (69.1)	21.1 (70.0)	19.7 (67.5)	16.9 (62.4)	14.4 (57.9)	12.2 (54.0)	11.5 (52.7)	12.1 (53.8)	13.4 (56.1)	15.4 (59.7)	17.1 (62.8)	18.9 (66.0)	16.1 (61.0)
Mean daily minimum °C (°F)	11.0 (51.8)	11.6 (52.9)	10.4 (50.7)	8.2 (46.8)	6.3 (43.3)	4.1 (39.4)	3.6 (38.5)	4.2 (39.6)	4.9 (40.8)	6.2 (43.2)	8.1 (46.6)	9.6 (49.3)	7.4 (45.2)
Record low °C (°F)	0.0 (32.0)	0.9 (33.6)	1.2 (34.2)	−2.3 (27.9)	−2.6 (27.3)	−2.6 (27.3)	−3.2 (26.2)	−2.9 (26.8)	−2.6 (27.3)	−2.8 (27.0)	−0.6 (30.9)	−0.2 (31.6)	−3.2 (26.2)
Average precipitation mm (inches)	52.0 (2.05)	43.6 (1.72)	56.9 (2.24)	70.3 (2.77)	84.6 (3.33)	95.9 (3.78)	117.1 (4.61)	112.6 (4.43)	89.9 (3.54)	81.0 (3.19)	68.6 (2.70)	64.8 (2.55)	936.5 (36.87)
Average precipitation days (≥ 0.2 mm)	8.7	7.7	9.9	10.9	13.5	14.0	16.7	16.9	14.7	12.9	11.2	10.2	147.3
Mean monthly sunshine hours	266.6	234.5	207.7	168.0	136.4	123.0	130.2	148.8	177.0	223.2	234.0	254.2	2,303.6
Percentage possible sunshine	58	61	54	51	45	44	44	46	50	54	54	54	51
Source: Bureau of Meteorology (1966-1996 normals and extremes, rainfall to 2024)

== Education ==
Ulverstone has three public primary schools and one public high school/college:

- East Ulverstone Primary School
- Central Ulverstone Primary School
- West Ulverstone Primary School
- Ulverstone Secondary College

There are two private schools in Ulverstone:

- Sacred Heart Primary School
- Leighland Christian School

As of 2017, students studying Years 11 and 12 can study at Ulverstone Secondary College, or commute to Penguin District School in Penguin, to Don College in Devonport, or to Hellyer College in Burnie.

Ulverstone is home to TastroFest - Tasmania's Astronomy Festival. This event is held annually in August and is the largest astronomy festival in Australia. Centred around education, this event holds both student and public programs over three days.

== Notable people ==
- Nita Burke (born 1937), Australian basketball representative
- Noel Carter, Australian rules footballer
- Richard Fromberg, tennis player
- Kerry Good, Australian rules footballer
- Peter Hamilton, Australian rules footballer
- John Heathcote, Australian rules footballer
- Ben Hilfenhaus, Australian national and state cricketer
- Joseph Lyons, Prime Minister of Australia from 1932 to 1939, spent some of his early years living in Ulverstone - he arrived with his family from Stanley at age 5 and attended school, but his family relocated back to Stanley when Joseph was 12.
- Frank MacDonald, last-surviving Tasmanian veteran of World War I
- Karl Menzies, cyclist
- David Neitz, Australian rules footballer
- Alex Pearce, Australian rules footballer
- Dion Scott, Australian rules footballer
- Reyne Smith, basketball player
- Tammy Tyrell, federal senator
- Craig Walton, triathlete and coach

== See also ==
- West Ulverstone, Tasmania
