= Wilmot, Tasmania =

Wilmot
- Suburb
- Coordinates: 41°23′06″S 146°09′58″E
- Country: Australia
- State: Tasmania
- Region: North West
- LGA: Kentish
- Location: 33 km (21 mi) S of Ulverstone
- Established: c. 1900

Government
  - State electorate: Lyons
  - Federal division: Lyons
- Elevation: 250 m (820 ft)

Population
  - Total: 287 (2021)
- Postcode: 7310
- Mean max temp: 22.3 °C (72.1 °F)
- Mean min temp: 3.4 °C (38.1 °F)
- Annual rainfall: 1,069.5 mm (42.11 in)
Suburbs around Wilmot
| | Lower Wilmot, Nowhere Else | Barrington |
| Nietta, Upper Castra | Wilmot | West Kentish, Roland, Promised Land |
| South Nietta | Erriba | Staverton |

Wilmot is a village and a small rural community in the local government area of Kentish in the North West region of Tasmania. It is located 25 km (33 by road) south of Ulverstone and 28 km (39 km by road) south-west of Devonport.

The 2021 census determined a population of 287 for the state suburb of Wilmot.

== History ==
The locality was named for Sir John Eardley-Wilmot, 1st Baronet, Lieutenant Governor of Van Diemen's Land (now Tasmania) from 1843 to 1846.

Wilmot was a parish name prior to 1900 but no town of that name had been surveyed.

A Wilmot post station existed in 1899.

The town name was proclaimed in 1903, and Wilmot was gazetted as a locality in 1965.

The former locality of Narrawa was incorporated into Wilmot in 2000.

The Coles family operated a store in Wilmot between 1910 and 1921 as their first permanent retail outlet. That store was destroyed by fire in 2014.

== Geography ==
Lake Barrington forms the eastern boundary, and the Wilmot River forms almost all of the western boundary.

== Local attractions ==
- Wilmot Historic Museum
- Lake Barrington, known for fishing and water sports, including the Lake Barrington International Rowing Course
- Forth Falls, a series of three picturesque waterfalls and smaller cascades on Forth Falls Creek above Lake Barrington, accessible from the Lake Barrington Road
- Wilmot Memorial Hall, with a mural called The Cradle Trail commemorating the work of Gustav and Kate Weindorfer, botanists and conservation pioneers behind the creation of Cradle Mountain-Lake St Clair National Park
- Castra Circuit of four waterfalls: Silver Falls, Castra Falls, Step Falls and Secret Place
- Wilmot Novelty Letterbox Trail

Due to its proximity, Wilmot serves as a base for Cradle Mountain-Lake St Clair National Park and the Overland Track visitors.

Other attractions nearby include Leven Canyon, Mount Roland Conservation Area and the artist town of Sheffield.

== Road infrastructure ==
The C132 route (Wilmot Road) passes through the locality from north to south. Route C133 (Back Road) starts at an intersection with C132 and runs north before exiting to the north-west. Route C135 (Buxtons Road / Lake Barrington Road) forms a loop between two intersections with C132, providing access to Lake Barrington.
