= Paradise, Tasmania =

Paradise Tasmania
- Coordinates: 41°26′03″S 146°18′56″E
- Population: 112 (2016 census)
- Postcode(s): 7306
- Location: 33 km (21 mi) S of Devonport
- LGA(s): Kentish
- Region: North West
- State electorate(s): Lyons
- Federal division(s): Lyons
Localities around Paradise:
Sheffield	Sheffield	Sheffield
Claude Road	Paradise	Beulah, Lower Beulah
Mount Roland	Mole Creek	Mole Creek

Paradise is a locality and small rural community in the local government area of Kentish in the North West region of Tasmania. It is located about 33 kilometres (21 mi) south of the town of Devonport. The 2016 census determined a population of 112 for the state suburb of Paradise.

== History ==
“Paradise” was originally named “Reuben Austen’s Paradise” after white Calvinist settler Reuben Austen, who saw the sun glistening on the picturesque mountain vista and remarked: “This is paradise". Paradise was gazetted as a locality in 1965.

== Geography ==
The Dasher River forms a small part of the north-western boundary before passing through to the north and forming part of the northern boundary.

== Road infrastructure ==
The C137 route (Paradise Road / Union Bridge Road) passes through the locality from north to south. Route C157 (Beulah Road) starts at an intersection with C137 and runs east along the eastern boundary before turning north towards Beulah.
