= Lorinna, Tasmania =

Lorinna
- Town
- Coordinates: 41°32′27″S 146°08′40″E
- Country: Australia
- State: Tasmania
- Region: North-west and west
- LGA: Kentish
- Location: 38 km (24 mi) SW of Sheffield

Government
  - State electorate: Lyons
  - Federal division: Lyons

Population
  - Total: 77 (2016 census)
- Postcode: 7306
Localities around Lorinna
Cethana	Cethana	Mount Roland
Moina	Lorinna	Liena
Middlesex	Mersey Forest	Mersey Forest

Lorinna is a rural locality in the local government area (LGA) of Kentish in the North-west and west LGA region of Tasmania. The locality is about 38 kilometres (24 mi) south-west of the town of Sheffield. The 2016 census recorded a population of 77 for the state suburb of Lorinna.

The entire community of Lorinna is independent from the Tasmanian grid, relying on its own electricity production from renewable energy sources. It is also supplied by its own organic food production, that local farms also sell at regional markets. Lorinna has been described as Tasmania's only gated community.

== History ==
Lorinna was gazetted as a locality in 1965. The name is believed to be an Aboriginal word meaning "waddy".

== Geography ==
The Forth River / Lake Cethana forms the western boundary.

== Road infrastructure ==
Route C138 (Olivers Road) follows part of the eastern boundary. From there, Lemonthyme Road (which also follows part of the eastern boundary) and Lorinna Road provide access to the locality. The access roads to Lorinna have occasionally been closed due to snow, fire emergency or floods.
