= Erriba, Tasmania =

Erriba
- Town
- Coordinates: 41°26′24″S 146°06′48″E
- Country: Australia
- State: Tasmania
- Region: North-west and west
- LGA: Kentish
- Location: 37 km (23 mi) SW of Sheffield

Government
  - State electorate: Lyons
  - Federal division: Lyons

Population
  - Total: 47 (2016 census)
- Postcode: 7310
Localities around Erriba
Nietta	Wilmot	Promised Land, Wilmot
South Nietta	Erriba	Staverton
Moina	Moina, Cethana	Cethana

Erriba is a rural locality in the local government area (LGA) of Kentish in the North-west and west LGA region of Tasmania. The locality is about 37 kilometres (23 mi) south-west of the town of Sheffield. The 2016 census recorded a population of 47 for the state suburb of Erriba.

== History ==
Erriba was gazetted as a locality in 1965. The name is believed to be an Aboriginal word for "cockatoo".

A post office of that name was opened in 1910.

== Geography ==
The Wilmot River forms the western boundary, and the Forth River forms part of the eastern.

== Road infrastructure ==
Route C132 (Cradle Mountain Road) passes through from north-east to south, and then follows the southern boundary for some distance.
