= Lower Beulah =

- Town
- Coordinates: 41°26′59″S 146°24′36″E
- Country: Australia
- State: Tasmania
- Region: North-west and west
- LGA: Kentish
- Location: 17 km (11 mi) SE of Sheffield

Government
  - State electorate: Lyons
  - Federal division: Lyons

Population
  - Total: 55 (2016 census)
- Postcode: 7306
Localities around Lower Beulah
Stoodley	Stoodley	Kimberley
Beulah	Lower Beulah	Kimberley, Weegena
Mole Creek	Mole Creek	Mole Creek

Lower Beulah is a rural locality in the local government area (LGA) of Kentish in the North-west and west LGA region of Tasmania. The locality is about 17 kilometres (11 mi) south-east of the town of Sheffield. The 2016 census recorded a population of 55.

== History ==
Lower Beulah was gazetted as a locality in 1965.

The name Beulah is Biblical in origin It is believed to mean, among other things, “the gates of heaven”. Gold was once mined in the locality.

== Geography ==
The Mersey River forms part of the eastern boundary. The Dasher River, a tributary of the Mersey, forms a small part of the northern boundary. The Minnow River forms part of the western boundary before flowing through to form part of the eastern, where it then joins the Dasher at the north-east corner.

== Road infrastructure ==
Route C159 (Lower Beulah Road / Dynans Bridge Road) runs from the north-west to the village in the centre, and then to the east, where it exits. Route C157, a continuation of Lower Beulah Road, runs west from the village until it exits.
