= Cethana, Tasmania =

Cethana Tasmania
- Coordinates: 41°28′48″S 146°08′51″E
- Population: 0 (2016 census)
- Postcode(s): 7306
- Location: 52 km (32 mi) SW of Devonport
- LGA(s): Kentish
- Region: North West
- State electorate(s): Lyons
- Federal division(s): Lyons
Localities around Cethana:
Erriba	Staverton	Staverton
Moina	Cethana	Mount Roland Conservation Area
Moina	Lorinna	Mount Roland

Cethana is a small rural community in the local government area of Kentish in the North West region of Tasmania. It is located about 52 kilometres (32 mi) south-west of the town of Devonport. The 2016 census determined a population of nil for the state suburb of Cethana.

== History ==
The locality was previously known as Round Hill. The meaning of Cethana is believed to be an Aboriginal word for “hair”. Cethana was gazetted as a locality in 1965.

== Geography ==
Cethana Road (Route C136) forms part of the northern boundary. Cethana Power Station, with its associated dam, is within the locality.

== Road infrastructure ==
The C136 route (Cethana Road) enters the locality from the west, follows much of the northern boundary, passes through the eastern part, and exits to the east. Route C140 (Staverton Road) starts at an intersection with route C136 and exits to the north-east. Route C138 (Olivers Road) starts at an intersection with route C136 and exits to the south.
