= Claude Road, Tasmania =

Claude Road
- Town
- Coordinates: 41°26′32″S 146°15′57″E
- Country: Australia
- State: Tasmania
- Region: North-west and west
- LGA: Kentish
- Location: 9 km (5.6 mi) SW of Sheffield

Government
  - State electorate: Lyons
  - Federal division: Lyons

Population
  - Total: 257 (2016 census)
- Postcode: 7306
Localities around Claude Road
West Kentish	Sheffield	Paradise
Staverton, Gowrie Park, Promised Land, Roland	Claude Road	Paradise, Mount Roland
Gowrie Park	Gowrie Park, Mount Roland	Mount Roland

Claude Road is a rural locality in the local government area (LGA) of Kentish in the North-west and west LGA region of Tasmania. The locality is about 9 kilometres (5.6 mi) south-west of the town of Sheffield. The 2016 census recorded a population of 257 for the state suburb of Claude Road.

== History ==
Claude Road was gazetted as a locality in 1965. A post office of that name opened in 1906.

== Geography ==
Most boundaries are survey lines. The Dasher River, a tributary of the Mersey River, flows through from south-west to north-east where it briefly follows the northern boundary.

== Road infrastructure ==
Route C136 (Claude Road) passes through from north-east to south-west.
