= Liena =

Liena Tasmania
- Coordinates: 41°33′41″S 146°13′25″E
- Population: 30 (2016 census)
- Postcode(s): 7304
- Location: 64 km (40 mi) SW of Devonport
- LGA(s): Meander Valley, Kentish
- Region: North West
- State electorate(s): Lyons
- Federal division(s): Lyons
Localities around Liena:
Mount Roland	Mount Roland	Mount Roland
Lorinna	Liena	Mayberry
Mersey Forest	Mersey Forest	Mersey Forest

Liena is a locality and small rural community in the local government areas of Meander Valley and Kentish in the North West region of Tasmania. It is located about 64 kilometres (40 mi) south-west of the town of Devonport. The 2016 census determined a population of 30 for the state suburb of Liena.

== History ==
The locality name is believed to be derived from a Tasmanian Aboriginal word for “(fresh) water”, but various other meanings have been suggested. One such is that the name is a corruption of an Aboriginal word "lienah" which means "fire in the bush". The name was gazetted in 1965.

== Geography ==
The Mersey River runs from south to north through the locality, forming part of the eastern boundary. The Mount Roland Regional Reserve, which contains Mount Roland and the Mount Roland Conservation Area, abuts the northern boundary. The Mersey River Forest Reserve abuts the southern boundary. King Solomons Cave, a tourist attraction, is within the locality.

== Road infrastructure ==
The C138 route (Olivers Road and Mersey Forest Road) forms part of the western boundary of the locality, from where it runs through to the south and loosely follows the southern boundary eastwards before passing through to the north-east where it terminates at an intersection with the B12 route (Liena Road). The B12 route enters the locality from the north-east and then turns north-west to King Solomons Cave.
