= Jack Chamberlain (politician) =

Australian politician (1884–1953)

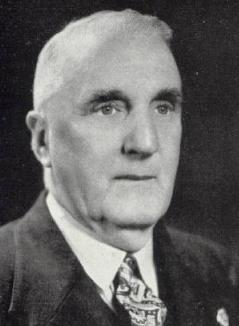

Senator for Tasmania
- In office 28 April 1951 – 16 January 1953
- Succeeded by: John Marriott

Member of the Tasmanian House of Assembly
- In office 9 June 1934 – 22 March 1951
- Constituency: Darwin

Personal details
- Born: 29 April 1884 Manchester, England
- Died: 16 January 1953 (aged 68) Ulverstone, Tasmania, Australia
- Party: Liberal
- Spouse: Ada Dawson (m. 1909)
- Occupation: Farmer

John Hartley Chamberlain (29 April 1884 – 16 January 1953) was an Australian politician. He served as a Senator for Tasmania from 1951 until his death in 1953, representing the Liberal Party. He was also a member of the Tasmanian House of Assembly from 1934 to 1951, briefly serving as deputy opposition leader. He was a farmer at Latrobe prior to entering politics, having taken up land as a soldier settler.

== Early life ==
Chamberlain was born on 29 April 1884 in Manchester, England, the son of Alice (née Hartley) and John Chamberlain. The family immigrated to Tasmania in 1886, initially living in Hobart before settling in Latrobe on the north-west coast in 1890. His father was a Baptist minister and served as secretary of the Baptist Union of Tasmania, as well as town clerk for the Latrobe Municipal Council.

Having previously been the manager of a livery yard, Chamberlain enlisted in the Australian Imperial Force (AIF) in October 1917 and served in France with the 12th Battalion. He was wounded on active service, returning to Australia in May 1919 and taking up land at Preston as a soldier settler. Chamberlain was a founding member of the Ulverstone branch of the Returned Sailors' and Soldiers' Imperial League of Australia, serving as branch president from 1925 to 1927 and winning election to the state executive in 1930.

== State politics ==
Chamberlain was elected to the Tasmanian House of Assembly at the 1934 state election, standing as a Nationalist in the seat of Darwin. He resigned from state parliament on 22 March 1951 to stand for the Senate, having transferred to the new Liberal Party upon its creation in 1951.

Chamberlain's entire career in state politics was spent in opposition, during a 35-year period of Australian Labor Party (ALP) governments. He was elected deputy leader of the Liberal Party on 9 November 1949, following the resignation of Reg Wright, defeating three other candidates in a partyroom ballot. He did not stand for re-election in June 1950.

== Federal politics ==
At the 1951 federal election, Chamberlain was elected to the Senate; he polled well in north-west Tasmania. His term began immediately as the election followed a double dissolution. In the Senate he spoke primarily on local matters and issues relating to repatriation. Following his death in office in 1953, John Marriott was appointed to fill the casual vacancy.

== Personal life ==
Chamberlain married Ada Sarah Dawson in 1909, with whom he had a son and two daughters. He died at the Ulverstone General Hospital on 16 January 1953, aged 68, having collapsed two days earlier at a meeting of the Ulverstone Chamber of Commerce.
