= Stoodley, Tasmania =

Stoodley Tasmania
- Coordinates: 41°23′42″S 146°24′48″E
- Population: 48 (2016 census)
- Postcode(s): 7306
- Location: 31 km (19 mi) SE of Devonport
- LGA(s): Kentish
- Region: North West
- State electorate(s): Lyons
- Federal division(s): Lyons
Localities around Stoodley:
| Railton | Sunnyside | Sunnyside |
| Sheffield | Stoodley | Sunnyside |
| Sheffield | Beulah | Kimberley |

Stoodley is a locality and small rural community in the local government area of Kentish in the North West region of Tasmania. It is located about 31 kilometres (19 mi) south-east of the town of Devonport. The 2016 census determined a population of 48 for the state suburb of Stoodley.

== History ==
Stoodley was gazetted as a locality in 1965.

== Geography ==
The Dasher River forms a loop through the south-east corner of the locality, enclosing part of the Dasher River Conservation Area.

== Road infrastructure ==
The B14 route (Sheffield Road) passes along the north-west boundary. Route C156 (Bridle Track Road) starts at an intersection with B14 in Sheffield and runs through Stoodley from west to east. Route C157 (Beulah Road) starts at an intersection with C156 and exits to the south.
