= Gowrie Park, Tasmania =

Gowrie Park Tasmania
- Coordinates: 41°28′00″S 146°13′25″E
- Population: 32 (2016 census)
- Postcode(s): 7306
- Location: 14 km (9 mi) SW of Sheffield
- LGA(s): Kentish
- Region: North-west and west
- State electorate(s): Lyons
- Federal division(s): Lyons
Localities around Gowrie Park:
Promised Land	Claude Road	Claude Road
Staverton	Gowrie Park	Mount Roland
Mount Roland	Mount Roland	Mount Roland

Gowrie Park is a rural locality in the local government area (LGA) of Kentish in the North-west and west LGA region of Tasmania. The locality is about 14 kilometres (8.7 mi) south-west of the town of Sheffield. The 2016 census recorded a population of 32 for the state suburb of Gowrie Park.

== History ==
Gowrie Park was gazetted as a locality in 1957. The name is believed to have come from the farm of an early settler.

== Geography ==
The Dasher River flows through from south-west to north.

== Road infrastructure ==
Route C136 (Claude Road) passes through from north to south.
