= Roland, Tasmania =

Roland
- Town
- Coordinates: 41°24′33″S 146°14′12″E
- Country: Australia
- State: Tasmania
- Region: North West
- LGA: Kentish
- Location: 34 km (21 mi) SW of Devonport

Government
  - State electorate: Lyons
  - Federal division: Lyons

Population
  - Total: 88 (2021 census)
- Postcode: 7306
Localities around Roland
| Wilmot | West Kentish | West Kentish |
| Wilmot | Roland | West Kentish |
| Promised Land | Promised Land | Claude Road |

Roland is a locality and small rural community in the local government area of Kentish in the North West region of Tasmania, Australia. It is located about 34 kilometres (21 mi) south-west of the town of Devonport. The 2021 census recorded a population of 88.

== History ==
The village in the locality was the terminus of a 22 kilometre line from Railton opened by the Tasmanian Government Railways in 1914. It was known as Staverton Railway from 1915, changed to Dasher in 1917, and then to Roland in 1919. It was named for Captain Rolland, an early explorer in the district. Roland was gazetted as a locality in 1965.

== Geography ==
Lake Barrington forms the north-western boundary.

== Road infrastructure ==
The C140 route (Staverton Road) passes through the locality from north-east to south.
