= Sunnyside, Tasmania =

Sunnyside
- Town
- Coordinates: 41°22′44″S 146°27′05″E
- Country: Australia
- State: Tasmania
- Region: North-west and west
- LGA: Kentish
- Location: 16 km (9.9 mi) E of Sheffield

Government
  - State electorate: Lyons
  - Federal division: Lyons

Population
  - Total: 104 (2016 census)
- Postcode: 7306
Localities around Sunnyside
Railton	Merseylea	Merseylea
Railton	Sunnyside	Merseylea
Stoodley	Kimberley	Kimberley

Sunnyside is a rural locality in the local government area (LGA) of Kentish in the North-west and west LGA region of Tasmania. The locality is about 16 kilometres (9.9 mi) east of the town of Sheffield. The 2016 census recorded a population of 104 for the state suburb of Sunnyside.

== History ==
Sunnyside was gazetted as a locality in 1957.

== Geography ==
Most of the boundaries are survey lines.

== Road infrastructure ==
Route B13 (Railton Road) runs along the north-east boundary. From there, Maloneys Road and Sunnyside Road provide access to the locality.
