= Nook, Tasmania =

Nook Tasmania
- Coordinates: 41°19′48″S 146°19′57″E
- Population: 188 (2016 census)
- Postcode(s): 7306
- Location: 9 km (6 mi) N of Sheffield
- LGA(s): Kentish
- Region: North-west and west
- State electorate(s): Lyons
- Federal division(s): Lyons
Localities around Nook:
Lower Barrington	Acacia Hills	Railton
Barrington	Nook	Railton
Barrington	Sheffield	Railton

Nook is a rural locality in the local government area (LGA) of Kentish in the North-west and west LGA region of Tasmania. The locality is about 9 kilometres (5.6 mi) north of the town of Sheffield. The 2016 census recorded a population of 188 for the state suburb of Nook.

== History ==
Nook was gazetted as a locality in 1965.

== Geography ==
The Don River forms two segments of the western boundary.

== Road infrastructure ==
Route C150 (Nook Road) runs through from north to south.
