= Lower Barrington =

- Town
- Coordinates: 41°17′14″S 146°17′23″E
- Country: Australia
- State: Tasmania
- Region: North West
- LGA: Kentish
- Location: 16 km (9.9 mi) SW of Devonport

Government
  - State electorate: Lyons
  - Federal division: Lyons

Population
  - Total: 238 (2016 census)
- Postcode: 7306
Localities around Lower Barrington
Paloona	Melrose	Acacia Hills
Lower Wilmot	Lower Barrington	Acacia Hills
Lower Wilmot	Barrington	Nook

Lower Barrington is a locality and small rural community in the local government area of Kentish in the North West region of Tasmania. It is located about 16 kilometres (9.9 mi) south-west of the town of Devonport. The 2016 census determined a population of 238 for the state suburb of Lower Barrington.

== History ==
The name "Barrington" was originally applied to a parish in or before 1855. Lower Barrington was gazetted as a locality in 1965.

== Geography ==
The Forth River, forms the south-western boundary, while the Don River forms the eastern boundary.

== Road infrastructure ==
The B14 route (Sheffield Road) enters the locality from the north-east and exits to the south. The C144 route (Lower Barrington Road) starts at an intersection with route B14 and runs north-west before turning west as Lake Paloona Road and exiting to the west. Lower Barrington Road continues north-west as Route C145 before exiting to the north. The C147 route (Melrose Road) starts at an intersection with route B14 and exits to the north.
