= Lower Wilmot =

Town in north-west Tasmania

- Town
- Coordinates: 41°18′46″S 146°12′35″E
- Country: Australia
- State: Tasmania
- Region: North-west and west
- LGA: Kentish
- Location: 29 km (18 mi) NW of Sheffield

Government
  - State electorate: Lyons
  - Federal division: Lyons

Population
  - Total: 115 (2016 census)
- Postcode: 7310
Localities around Lower Wilmot
Kindred	Kindred	Paloona
Sprent, Upper Castra	Lower Wilmot	Barrington, Lower Barrington
Upper Castra	Wilmot	Nowhere Else

Lower Wilmot is a rural locality in the local government area (LGA) of Kentish in the North-west and west LGA region of Tasmania. The locality is about 29 kilometres (18 mi) north-west of the town of Sheffield. The 2016 census recorded a population of 115 for the state suburb of Lower Wilmot.

== History ==
Lower Wilmot was gazetted as a locality in 1965.

== Geography ==
The Forth River forms the eastern boundary. The Wilmot River, a tributary of the Forth, forms the western and northern boundaries, joining the Forth at the north-east corner.

== Road infrastructure ==
Route C132 (Wilmot Road) runs through from north to south.
