= Middlesex, Tasmania =

Middlesex
- Town
- Coordinates: 41°33′27″S 146°03′32″E
- Country: Australia
- State: Tasmania
- Region: Launceston, North-west and west
- LGA: Meander Valley, Central Coast, Kentish
- Location: 40 km (25 mi) SW of Sheffield

Government
  - State electorate: Lyons, Braddon
  - Federal division: Lyons, Braddon

Population
  - Total: 4 (2016 census)
- Postcode: 7306
Localities around Middlesex
Guildford	Loongana, South Nietta	Moina
Guildford	Middlesex	Moina
West Coast	Cradle Mountain	Mersey Forest

Middlesex is a rural locality in the local government areas (LGA) of Meander Valley, Central Coast and Kentish in the Launceston and North-west and west LGA regions of Tasmania. The locality is about 40 kilometres (25 mi) south-west of the town of Sheffield. The 2016 census recorded a population of 4 for the state suburb of Middlesex.

== History ==
Middlesex is a confirmed locality.

== Geography ==
The Campbell River, a tributary of the Forth River, forms part of the eastern boundary. The Forth River then continues the eastern boundary further to the north.

== Road infrastructure ==
Route C132 (Cradle Mountain Road / Belvoir Road) passes through the locality from north-east to south-west. A branch of this road provides access to Cradle Mountain.
