= Mount Roland cable car =

Proposed cable-car line

The Mount Roland cable car was a proposed aerial lift (cable car) at Mount Roland, near Sheffield, Tasmania, Australia.

The proposal was worked upon by the Sheffield-Mt Roland Cable Car Company.

The route was first considered in the 1990s. A report from the University of Tasmania's Institute for Regional Development suggested that the cable car would appeal to people who cannot complete the four to six hours return walk to the summit. A cable car was mentioned in Kentish Council's recreational blueprint for Mount Roland.

It was estimated that such a proposal would cost around $13.5 million. The group proposed a community ownership.

This proposal was highly divisive in the community, and gained only limited support and given rise to the Mount Roland Preservation Society. The legal entity was deregistered in 2023.

== See also ==
- Mount Wellington cable car proposals
- Perth cable car
