= Staverton, Tasmania =

Staverton
- Town
- Coordinates: 41°27′32″S 146°11′02″E
- Country: Australia
- State: Tasmania
- Region: North-west and west
- LGA: Kentish
- Location: 19 km (12 mi) SW of Sheffield

Government
  - State electorate: Lyons
  - Federal division: Lyons

Population
  - Total: 88 (2016 census)
- Postcode: 7306
Localities around Staverton
Wilmot	Promised Land	Promised Land
Erriba	Staverton	Claude Road
Cethana	Mount Roland	Gowrie Park

Staverton is a rural locality in the local government area (LGA) of Kentish in the North-west and west LGA region of Tasmania. The locality is about 19 kilometres (12 mi) south-west of the town of Sheffield. The 2016 census recorded a population of 88 for the state suburb of Staverton.

== History ==
Staverton was gazetted as a locality in 1965.

== Geography ==
The Forth River forms the western boundary.

== Road infrastructure ==
Route C140 (Staverton Road) runs through from north to south.
