= Acacia Hills =

Acacia Hills may refer to:

- Acacia Hills, Northern Territory
- Acacia Hills, Tasmania
