= Kimberley, Tasmania =

Kimberley
- Suburb
- Coordinates: 41.400°S 146.493°E
- Country: Australia
- State: Tasmania
- Region: Launceston, North-west and west
- LGA: Meander Valley, Kentish
- Location: 39 km (24 mi) NW of Westbury

Government
  - State electorate: Lyons
  - Federal division: Lyons

Population
  - Total: 149 (2016)
- Postcode: 7304
Suburbs around Kimberley
Stoodley	Sunnyside	Elizabeth Town
Lower Beulah	Kimberley	Moltema, Elizabeth Town
Lower Beulah	Weegena, Lower Beulah	Moltema

Kimberley is a rural locality and town in the local government areas of Meander Valley and Kentish in the Launceston and North-west and west regions of Tasmania. The locality is about 39 kilometres (24 mi) north-west of the town of Westbury. The 2016 census recorded a population of 149 for the state suburb of Kimberley. It is about midway between the towns of Sheffield and Deloraine. Once a thriving village with a school, railway station, shops and two churches, it is now mostly a residential area.

There are clear springs running all year in the area. The White Rock Vineyard is close to the township. There is also an olive grove. The area is known for its dairy farms, beef breeding and fattening, prime lamb production, some cropping and irrigation.

== History ==
Kimberley was gazetted as a locality in 1965.

The local Anglican church, St Michael and All Angels Anglican Church, is no longer operating and is now a residence.

== Geography ==
The Mersey River forms part of the southern boundary, flows through from south to north, and then forms part of the northern boundary. One of the attractions of the area is the Kimberley Warm Springs.

Kimberley is the site of the Dasher River Conservation Area.

== Road infrastructure ==
Route B13 (Railton Road) runs through from north-east to north. Route C156 (Bridle Track Road) enters from the north and runs south-west until it exits. Route C160 (Weegena Road) starts at an intersection with B13 in the town and runs south until it exits.

== Notable people ==
Former Papua New Guinean politician Barry Holloway was born and buried at Kimberley.
