= Nowhere Else, Tasmania =

Nowhere Else
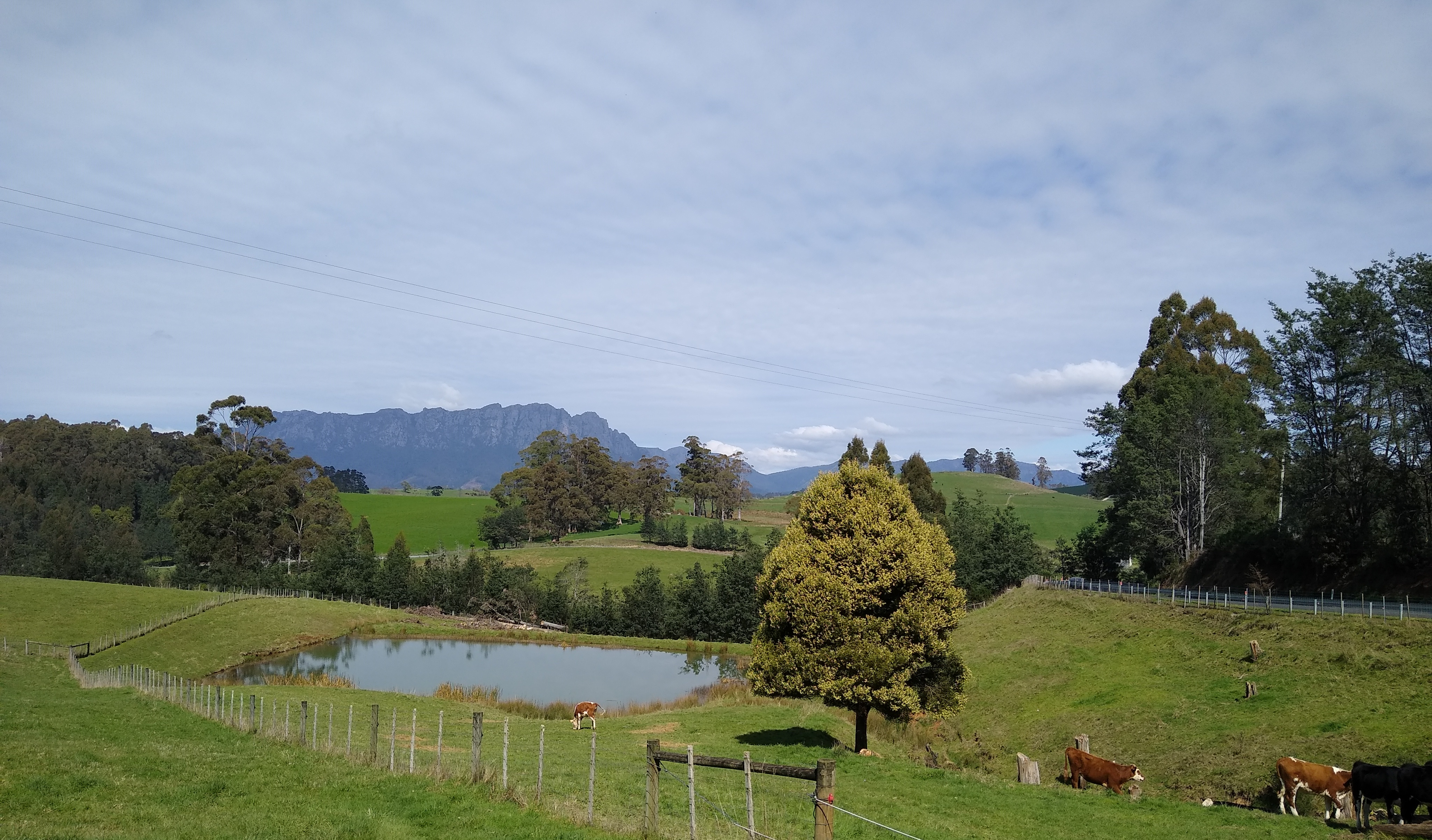

- Coordinates: 41.366°S 146.276°E
- Country: Australia
- State: Tasmania
- Region: North-west and west
- LGA: Kentish Council
- Location: 8 km (5.0 mi) W of Sheffield

Government
  - State electorate: Lyons
  - Federal division: Lyons

Population
  - Total: 40 (2016 census)
- Postcode: 7306
- Annual rainfall: 11 mm (0.43 in)
Localities around Nowhere Else
Lake Barrington	Barrington	Barrington
Lake Barrington	Nowhere Else	Sheffield
West Kentish	West Kentish	West Kentish

Nowhere Else is a rural locality in the local government area (LGA) of Kentish in the North-west and west LGA region of Tasmania. The locality is about 8 kilometres (5.0 mi) west of the town of Sheffield. The 2016 census recorded a population of 40 for the state suburb of Nowhere Else. It is a bounded rural locality on the island of Tasmania. It is located at latitude -41.366 and longitude 146.276. Located on Lake Barrington (Tasmania), Nowhere Else is 190 km from Hobart, and 72 km west of Launceston. The postcode is 7306.

== History ==
Nowhere Else was gazetted as a locality in 1957. The name is believed to originate from a road that led to a place with no name.

== Geography ==
Lake Barrington forms the north-western boundary.

== Road infrastructure ==
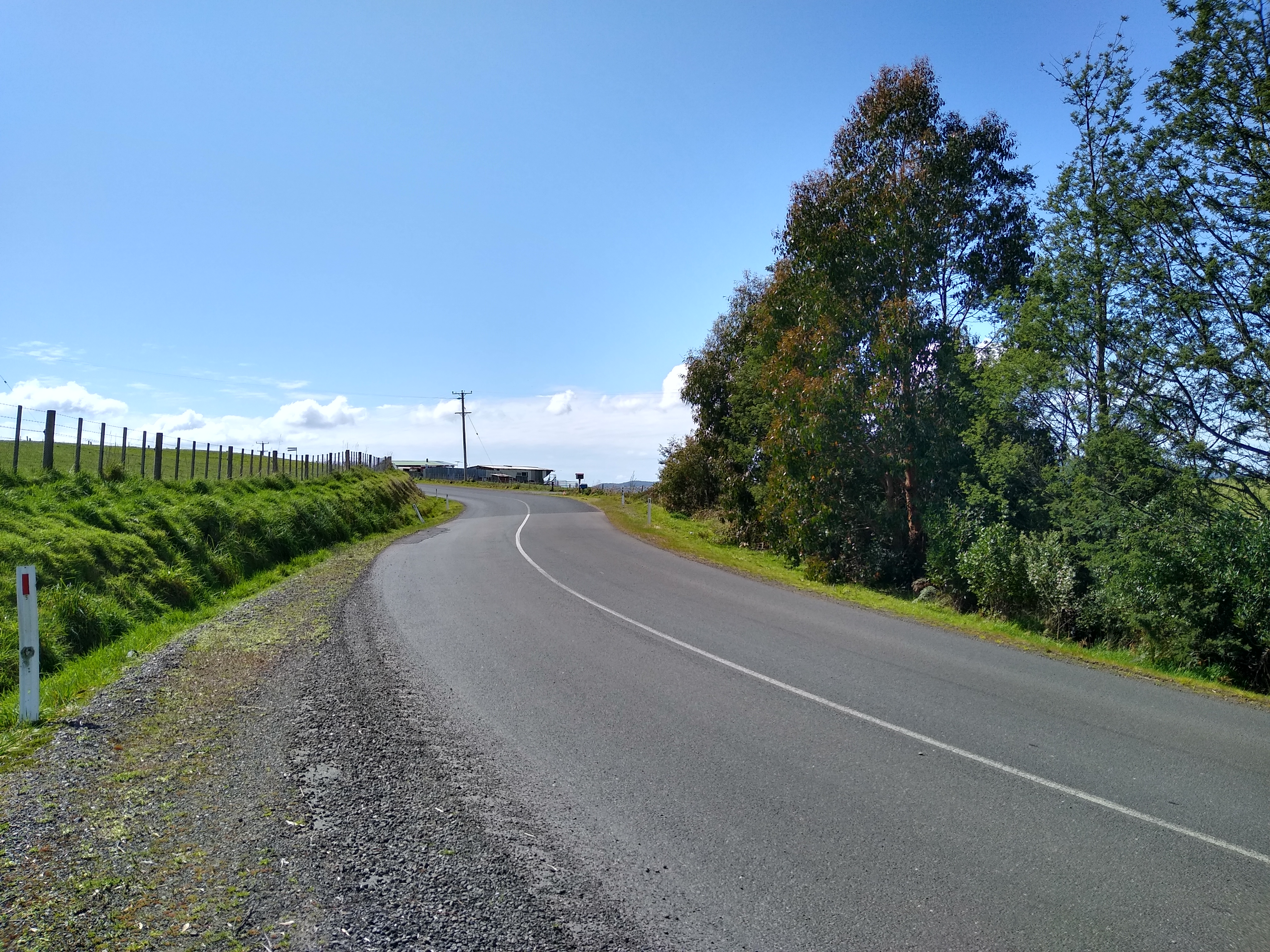
Route C143 in Nowhere Else

Route C143 (Nowhere Else Road) runs through from north-east to south-east.
