= West Kentish =

- Town
- Coordinates: 41°23′37″S 146°15′50″E
- Country: Australia
- State: Tasmania
- Region: North West
- LGA: Kentish
- Location: 29 km (18 mi) SW of Devonport

Government
  - State electorate: Lyons
  - Federal division: Lyons

Population
  - Total: 165 (2016 census)
- Postcode: 7306
Localities around West Kentish
Wilmot	Nowhere Else	Sheffield
Wilmot	West Kentish	Sheffield
Roland	Roland	Sheffield

West Kentish is a locality and small rural community in the local government area of Kentish in the North West region of Tasmania. It is located about 29 kilometres (18 mi) south-west of the town of Devonport. The 2016 census determined a population of 165 for the state suburb of West Kentish.

== History ==
The locality (and its Local Government Area) was named for Government Surveyor Nathaniel Kentish, who explored and surveyed the area. West Kentish was gazetted as a locality in 1965.

== Geography ==
Lake Barrington forms the north-western boundary. The source of the Don River is in the locality.

== Road infrastructure ==
The C141 route (West Kentish Road) passes through the locality from east to west, terminating at Lake Barrington. Route C140 (Staverton Road) starts at an intersection with C141 on the southern boundary and runs away to the south-west. Route C143 (Nowhere Else Road) starts at an intersection with C141 and exits to the north-west.
