= South Spreyton =

- Town
- Coordinates: 41°15′26″S 146°21′04″E
- Country: Australia
- State: Tasmania
- Region: North-west and west
- LGA: Kentish
- Location: 20 km (12 mi) N of Sheffield

Government
  - State electorate: Lyons
  - Federal division: Lyons

Population
  - Total: 510 (2016 census)
- Postcode: 7310
Localities around South Spreyton
Aberdeen	Aberdeen, Spreyton	Spreyton
Acacia Hills	South Spreyton	Tarleton, Latrobe
Acacia Hills	Latrobe	Latrobe

South Spreyton is a rural locality in the local government area (LGA) of Kentish in the North-west and west LGA region of Tasmania. The locality is about 20 kilometres (12 mi) north of the town of Sheffield. The 2016 census recorded a population of 510 for the state suburb of South Spreyton.

== History ==
South Spreyton is a confirmed locality.

== Geography ==
The boundaries are almost all survey lines.

== Road infrastructure ==
Route B14 (Sheffield Road) runs through the north-west corner.
