= Stoodley =

Stoodley may refer to:

- Sarah Stoodley, Canadian politician
- Stoodley Pike, a hill in Northern England
- Stoodley, Tasmania, a locality and small rural community in Australia

== See also ==
- Stoodleigh, a village in Devon, England
