= Douglas Wright (physiologist) =

Australian physiologist (1907–1990)

Sir Roy Douglas Wright AK (7 August 1907 – 28 February 1990) was an Australian physiologist and eminent academic administrator.

== Biography ==
He was born in Central Castra, Tasmania. He became Professor of Physiology at the University of Melbourne from 1939 to 1971 and was later Chancellor of the university from 1980 to 1989. He advised the leaders of the optometry profession who were responsible for setting up the Victorian College of Optometry in 1939 and 1940 and helped plan the first four-year optometry course. He was involved again when the optometry course was transferred to the university.

Wright married Julia Violet Bell, a nurse, on 24 September 1932 at Camperdown, Victoria; they subsequently divorced. On 22 July 1964 he married Meriel Antoinette Winchester Wilmot, his secretary since 1941, in the registry office, Kensington, England.

The young Wright of the 1930s sported circular glasses frames, while an older, more refined Wright turned his attention to a more edgy rectangular frame style by the early 1980s.

He was a colourful supporter of causes, as his biography Pansy Wright — A biography of Roy Douglas Wright by Peter McPhee (1999) attests. He challenged students, colleagues and institutions, asserting at one time: "Whatever you do, whether you do it well or do it badly, do it brilliantly. Avoid mediocrity on all accounts".

In the Australia Day Honours of 1983, he was made a Knight of the Order of Australia (AK).

He was the brother of Sir Reg Wright, a long-serving Liberal Senator from Tasmania, who was also knighted, and who died only ten days later, on 10 March 1990. His eldest brother, John Forsyth Wright was a Member of the House of Assembly in the Parliament of Tasmania.

== See also ==
- Peter McPhee, Pansy Wright: a biography of Roy Douglas Wright, 1999.

Academic offices
Preceded by Sir Oliver Gillard	Chancellor of the University of Melbourne; 1980–1989	Succeeded by Sir Edward Woodward
