= South Nietta =

- Town
- Coordinates: 41°24′16″S 146°04′41″E
- Country: Australia
- State: Tasmania
- Region: North-west and west
- LGA: Central Coast, Kentish
- Location: 38 km (24 mi) S of Ulverstone

Government
  - State electorate: Lyons, Braddon
  - Federal division: Lyons, Braddon

Population
  - Total: 9 (SAL 2016)
- Postcode: 7315
Localities around South Nietta
Loongana	Nietta	Erriba
Nietta, Middlesex	South Nietta	Erriba
Middlesex	Middlesex	Moina

South Nietta is a rural locality in the local government areas (LGA) of Central Coast and Kentish in the North-west and west LGA region of Tasmania. The locality is about 38 kilometres (24 mi) south of the town of Ulverstone. The 2021 census could not record a population for the state suburb of South Nietta because the population was too low.

== History ==
South Nietta was gazetted as a locality in 1965.

== Geography ==
The Lea River and the Wilmot River together form most of the eastern boundary.

== Road infrastructure ==
Route C129 (South Nietta Road) enters the locality from the north.
