= South Preston =

- Town
- Coordinates: 41°20′47″S 146°02′55″E
- Country: Australia
- State: Tasmania
- Region: North-west and west
- LGA: Central Coast
- Location: 28 km (17 mi) SW of Ulverstone

Government
  - State electorate: Braddon
  - Federal division: Braddon
- Postcode: 7315
Localities around South Preston
Gunns Plains	Preston, Gunns Plains	Upper Castra
Gunns Plains, Loongana	South Preston	Upper Castra, Nietta
Loongana	Nietta	Nietta

South Preston is a rural locality in the local government area (LGA) of Central Coast in the North-west and west LGA region of Tasmania. The locality is about 28 kilometres (17 mi) south-west of the town of Ulverstone. The 2021 census recorded a population of 21 for the state suburb of South Preston.

== History ==
South Preston was gazetted as a locality in 1965.

== Geography ==
The Leven River forms most of the western boundary.

== Road infrastructure ==
Route C125 (South Preston Road) passes through from north to south-east.
