= Mayberry, Tasmania =

Mayberry
- Town
- Coordinates: 41°33′41″S 146°13′25″E
- Country: Australia
- State: Tasmania
- Region: North West
- LGA: Meander Valley
- Location: 58 km (36 mi) S of Devonport

Government
  - State electorate: Lyons
  - Federal division: Lyons

Population
  - Total: 15 (2016)
- Postcode: 7304
Localities around Mayberry
Liena	Mole Creek	Mole Creek
Liena, Mersey Forest	Mayberry	Mole Creek
Mersey Forest	Mersey Forest	Central Plateau Conservation Area

Mayberry is a locality and small rural community in the local government area of Meander Valley in the North West region of Tasmania. It is located about 58 kilometres (36 mi) south of the town of Devonport. The 2016 census determined a population of 15 for the state suburb of Mayberry.

== History ==
The locality was previously known as Circular Ponds. Its name is believed to be derived from the names of two cows of an early settler, "May" and "Berry". The name was gazetted in 1965.

== Geography ==
The Mersey River forms a small part of the western boundary. The Mole Creek Karst National Park abuts the eastern boundary. The Mersey River Forest Reserve abuts the south-western boundary. Marakoopa Creek runs through the locality from south-west to north-east. The circular ponds which led to the original name still exist on flat land beside the creek.

== Road infrastructure ==
The B12 route (Liena Road) passes through the locality from east to west, forming a small section of the south-western boundary before entering Liena. The C138 route (Mersey Forest Road) starts at an intersection on this boundary and runs south through Liena. The C170 route (Mayberry Road) starts from Liena Road and runs south-west through the locality to Marakoopa Cave.
