= Loongana =

Loongana may refer to:

- Loongana, Tasmania
- Loongana, Western Australia
