= Nietta, Tasmania =

Nietta
- Town
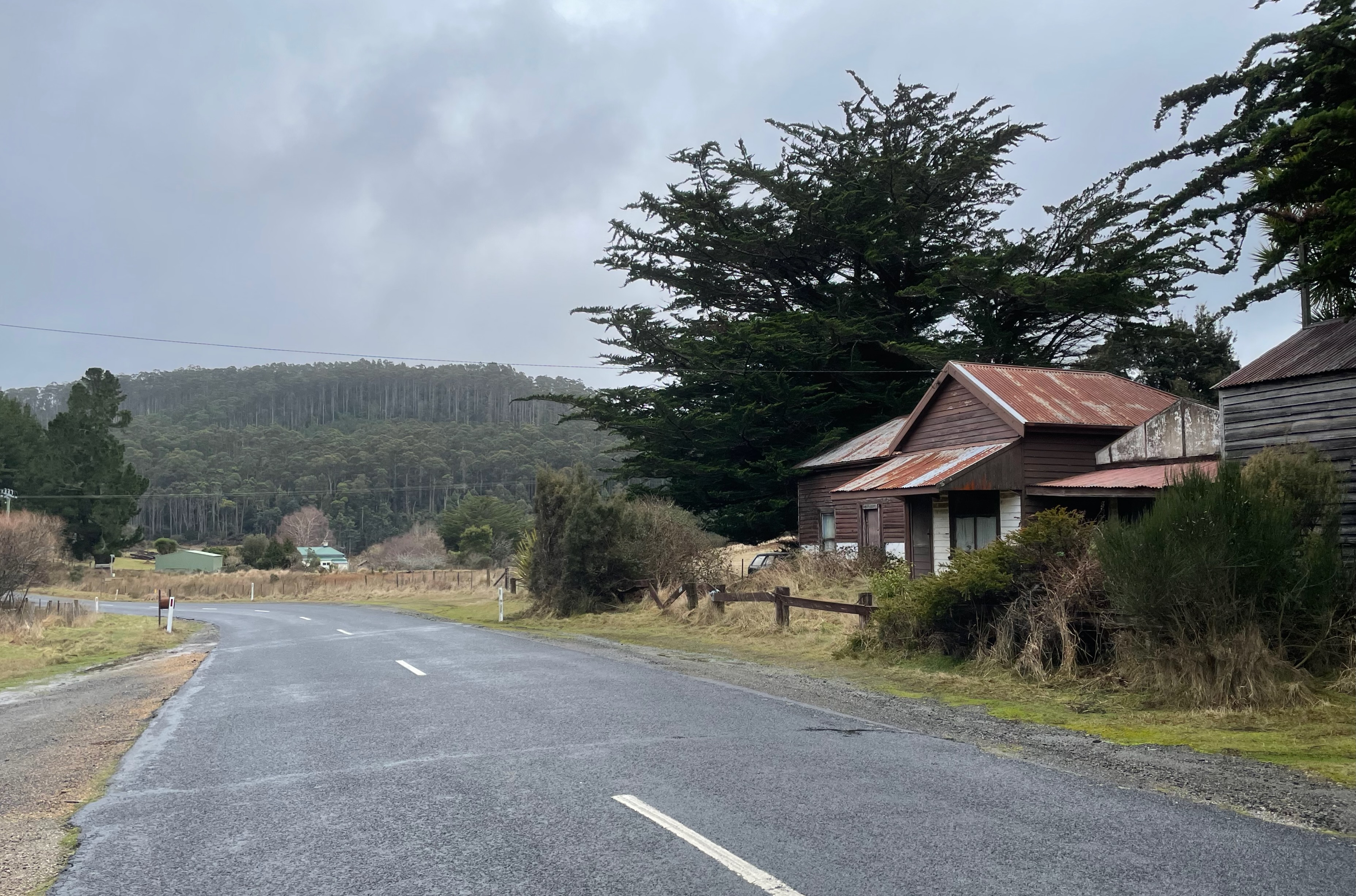

- Coordinates: 41°22′21″S 146°03′56″E
- Country: Australia
- State: Tasmania
- Region: North West
- LGA: Central Coast
- Location: 44 km (27 mi) SW of Devonport

Government
  - State electorate: Braddon
  - Federal division: Braddon

Population
  - Total: 63 (SAL 2021)
- Postcode: 7315
Localities around Nietta
South Preston	Upper Castra	Upper Castra
Loongana	Nietta	Wilmot
Loongana	South Nietta	Erriba

Nietta is a rural locality in the local government area of Central Coast, in North West Tasmania. It is located about 44 kilometres (27 mi) south-west of the town of Devonport. The 2021 census recorded a population of 63 for the state suburb of Nietta.

== History ==
The name was used for a parish from 1886. Nietta is an Aboriginal word meaning “little brother”. The locality was gazetted in 1965.

== Geography ==
The Wilmot River forms most of the eastern boundary, and the River Leven forms much of the western.

== Nietta railway line ==
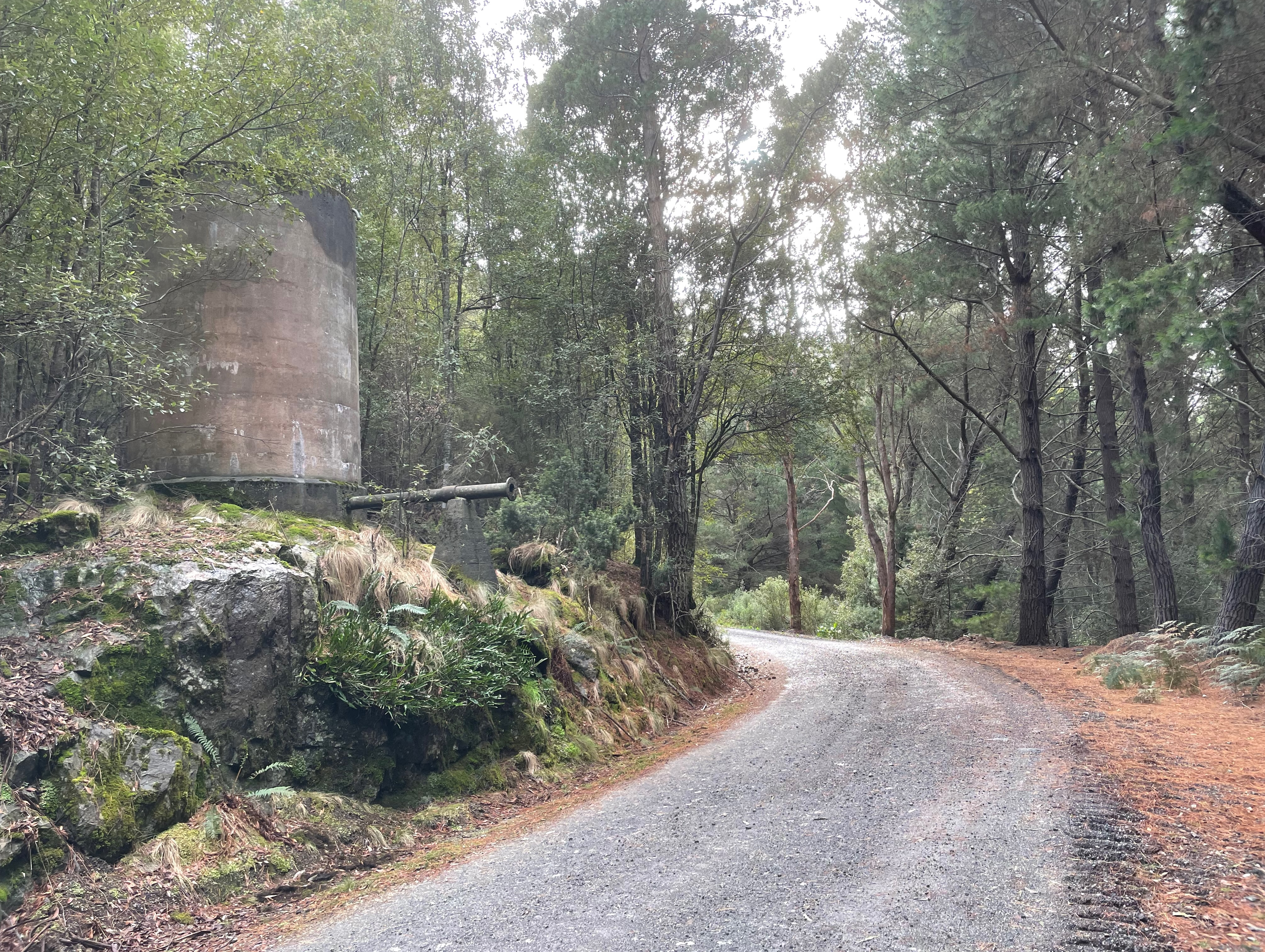
This road runs on the old rail line grade near Preston

Hubert Nichols was a champion and defender of the Ulverstone to Nietta narrow gauge railway.

In 1910 Nichols moved a motion at a public meeting in Ulverstone that 'the time has arrived when railway communication is necessary to facilitate the progress and development of the land south of Ulverstone, such as Castra, Nietta, Loongana, Moins, and the back country.

Construction got underway in 1915 and cost £108,171 to construct. In April the Preston formers were 'jubilant at the splendid progress being made' In August of that year it was predicted that a 'great increase in cropping, especially potatoes, will take place at Preston and Nietta this year as a result. Quite a large number of men are also now splitting, and the timber will provide freight for the line.

The 3ft 6in gauge railway opened on 20 December 1915. Among the passengers were the Joseph Lyons. At North Motton, the train was met by a lobby group from Gunns Plains disappointed that the line had bypassed their area. The train continued to Nietta before returning to South Preston for the formal lunch. The Minister for Lands James Belton noted in his speech that this railway was an experiment in cheaper railway construction with, for example, tighter curves. He trusted that all their hopes and expectations would be realised. When asked to speak Mr Nichols said it was one of the red-letter days of hls life, one he had looked forward to for twenty eight years when as a boy in Nietta he had written to the papers advocating for rail facilities to these splendid districts.

A determination was made to close the Nietta line (and the North East Dundas Tramway linking Zeehan and Willamsford) on 30 June 1932.

Nichols managed to keep the line open. In 1933 he reported the outgoing train from Ulverstone carried five trucks of manure, three trucks of various commodities and made up a full load with empties, to come down next week ladennwith timber, potatoes or grain. The return train had a load of 37 trucks, equal to 350 tons, of fat pigs, potatoes, timber, etc.

In 1934 a plague of caterpillars stopped the train between Kerrison and Nietta. In 1934 there were 31 students enrolled at the Nietta school.

Potatoes were exported from Nietta to Devonport and Sydney. On one day in 1935, at the Ulverstone railway station out of a total of 2,500 sacks, 1,000 had arrived by road and 1,500 sacks by rail from Nietta. (1,000 sacks of potatoes was approximately 100 metric tonnes.) It was in that year that Nicholls lost his seat in Parliament.

By 1936 competition between road and rail freight for heavy loads such as timber and potatoes was increasing. Road freight operators were undercutting rail freight but were causing damage to the roads that had to be repaired by funds from the rates. Deliveries of potatoes were predominantly by road with only a third by rail. By 1937 it was claimed only 10% of the freight was being carried by rail. A special train was put on in July 1937 to carry spectators to the Collingwood vs Geelong game in Devonport. (Reg Hickey was the Geelong captain.) The Nietta train left at 10:45 for a 14:30 game start in Devonport.

Optimism was felt in 1938 as the South Burnie Paper Mill would require huge quantities of wood for pulping and fuel from the Nietta and Loongana forests. Rather than one train a week, three might be needed as well as a line extension. A toll on timber carried by road was discussed.

The Rail Commissioner's visit in 1939 brought gloom. "I was rather appalled, however, by thoe small amount of patronage that the Nietta line receives, and the very great cost at which the service is being provided," declared tho Commissioner. He noted that only 1,300 of the 8,000 sacks of potatoes delivered in the week had come by rail.

In 1941 an increase on the road toll charged for timber was discussed. Later in the year there was optimism that 'extensive' new equipment being installed by the Loongana saw milling company would increase the quantity of timber carried by rail.

In 1942, the railway came into use to deliver firewood from Nietta to Ulverstone.

In 1943 the Burnie Advocate noted that the Education Department had given Jack Allen of Nietta approval to absent himself from school to help his father dig potatoes.

On 17 February 1945, the Nietta Patriotic Sports Committee held the third annual Carnival. The main event was the 50 guinea Foot Chop. In addition there were other wood chopping events, sawing and the Nietta Gift foot race over 120 yards. (The Sheffield distance used in other foot races such as the Burnie, Castlemaine, and Stawell Gifts.) The train service from Devonport to Nietta departed the port a 08:45 and arrived in Nietta 11:10. The train departed at 18:10 before the evening dance.

In 1946 the service was interrupted by a coal shortage. Further coal shortages followed in 1948 due to the NSW Coal Strike.

In 1947, 1948 and 1952 the line (and other branch lines) again came under review for closure.

A review in 1953 of all Tasmanian railways considered the replacement of coal-fired steam locomotives with (heavier) diesel engines. It found that considerable investment would be required on the Nietta line. The question arose whether the traffic on the line warranted that investment.

On 7 December 1956 the line was closed between Dewpearl and Nietta.

== Road infrastructure ==
The B15 route (Castra Road) enters from the north and terminates at Nietta village. Route C125 (South Preston Road) starts at an intersection with B15 and exits to the north-west. Route C128 (Loongana Road) starts from the end of B15 and runs south and west before exiting. Route C129 (South Nietta Road) starts from the end of B15 and runs south-east and south before exiting to South Nietta, where it turns west as Maxfields Road and re-enters Nietta after a short distance, ending at an intersection with C128.
