= Kimberley Warm Springs =

Thermal springs in Tasmania

Coordinates: 41°23′54″S 146°29′34″E

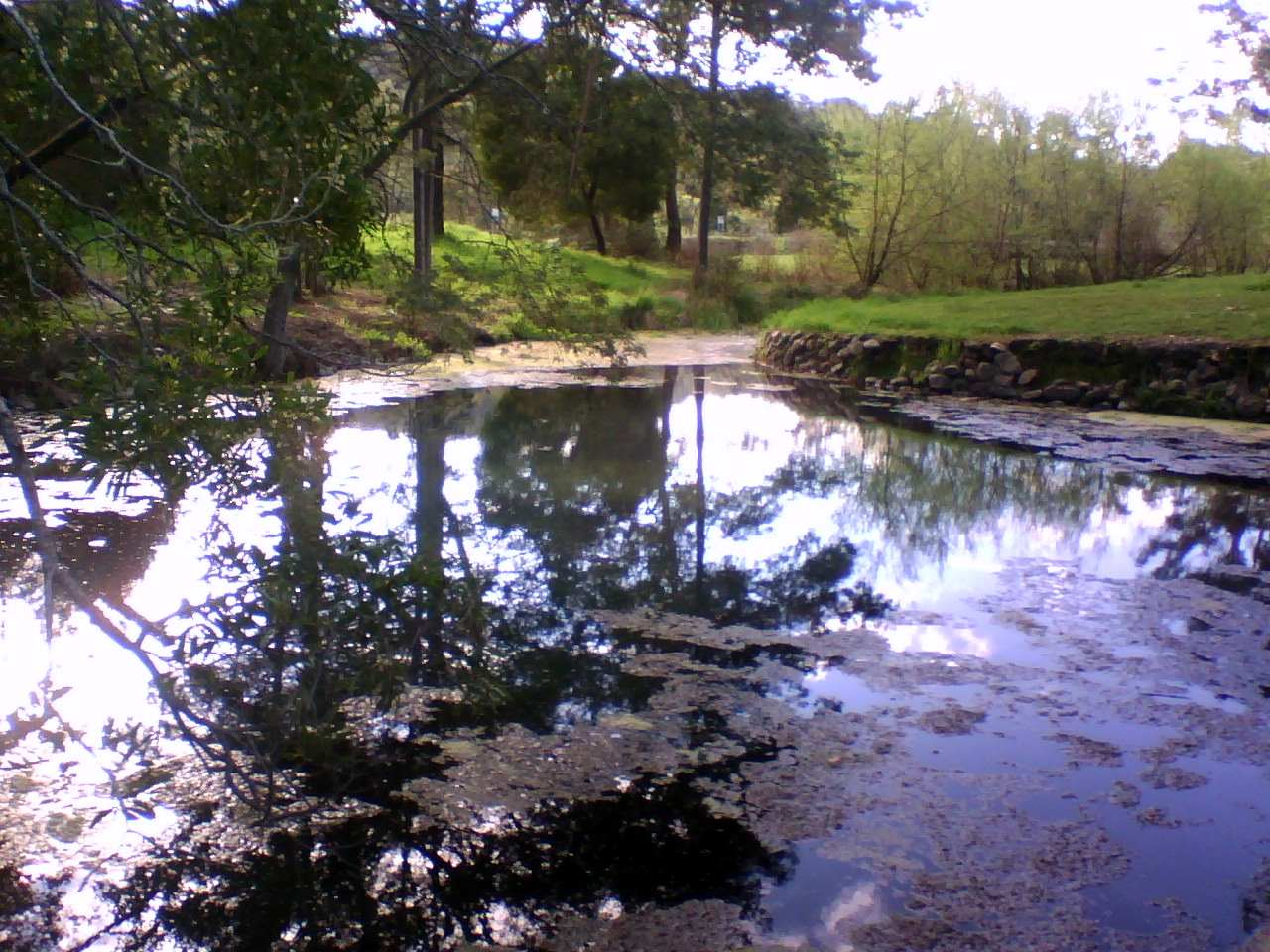
Pool at Kimberley Warm Springs, Tasmania

Kimberley Warm Springs are a geothermal feature and semi-developed visitor site located in the town of Kimberley, North West Tasmania.

The Springs are located within the Kimberley Warm Springs Reserve, which is managed by Parks and Wildlife Service Tasmania. The reserve features a constructed pool, approximately 13 metres by 20 metres and 1.2 metres deep, a sheltered barbecue area, parking and public toilets. Access to the site is from Warm Springs Road off Morrison Street. The site is well signposted within the town.

Water from the springs remains at a constant temperature of 24–-25 degrees Celsius. The water's chemical composition suggests it gains its heat from hotter sub-surface materials. The dissolved solids content is fairly low and contains mainly bicarbonate and calcium ions.

The clearance of shading vegetation has led to excessive algal growth, which is periodically removed as it covers the naturally sandy bottom of the spring.

The spring is the only one of its kind in the north-west of Tasmania. It is home to an endemic snail and an algae (Pithophora spp.) not previously recorded south of Sydney.
