= Tarleton, Tasmania =

Tarleton
- Town
- Coordinates: 41°14′18″S 146°22′6″E
- Country: Australia
- State: Tasmania
- Region: North-west and west
- LGA: Latrobe
- Location: 5 km (3.1 mi) W of Latrobe

Government
  - State electorate: Braddon
  - Federal division: Braddon

Population
  - Total: 380 (2016 census)
- Postcode: 7307
Localities around Tarleton
Spreyton	Mersey River estuary, Spreyton	Mersey River
South Spreyton	Tarleton	Latrobe
South Spreyton	Latrobe	Latrobe

Tarleton is a rural and residential locality in the local government area (LGA) of Latrobe in the North-west and west LGA region of Tasmania. The locality is about 5 kilometres (3.1 mi) west of the town of Latrobe. The 2016 census recorded a population of 380 for the state suburb of Tarleton.

== History ==
It is believed that the locality was named for William Tarleton, a notable government official in Tasmania in the 19th century. Tarleton was gazetted as a locality in 1962.

Captain William Moriarty took up land (200 acres) at Frogmore in ca.1835, his sister Lucinda settled there in 1836 and named Ballahoo Island. There is also a creek there called Ballahoo Creek and a road called Ballahoo Road. Frogmore was let to Henry Bonney in 1837.

Thomas Johnson (1808–1869) and his wife Dolly Dalrymple Mountgarret Briggs (1810–1864), the first known child of an Aboriginal and white person union moved there in 1845 and took over the tenancy of Frogmore. He made money from a paling splitting establishing and exporting timber to South Australia.

In early 1851 they leased and acquired by purchase part or all of the 600 acre Tarleton town reserve, and portion of Ballahoo Island together with some of the suburbs of Tarleton. 500 acres were purchased southwest of "Frogmore" and they built at a place named Sherwood (Part of Latrobe), and he owned-hotels at Sherwood and Ballahoo. He built a Sherwood Hall at the latter place for public recreation dances religious services and as a school.

Tarleton Post Office opened in 1891 and closed in 1893.

Sherwood Hall was relocated to its present site near Bells Parade, Latrobe in 1993 from its original site on Railton Road because it was threatened with collapse by long term erosion from the nearby Mersey River.

Thomas Johnson owned the town blocks and later discovered coal mine Alfred Colliery, which shipped its coal from Ballaho Creek. Coal Hill Road and Coal Mines Road are obviously named for a reason.

In 1870, William Riley and his family were the only people in Tarleton. Mr. Riley had a coal mine and was shipping coal to Launceston. In 1875, the 34-ton vessel Dawn of Hope was built by James Dyson for Riley.

In 1880 for George Atkinson Jr built Frogmore, a large two-storeyed brick classical villa with a tiled hipped roof.

The town today is a mix of residential housing, hobby farms and orchards.

== Geography ==
The waters of the Mersey River estuary form part of the northern boundary.

== Road infrastructure ==
Route B19 (Mersey Main Road) passes through from north to south-east.
