= Loongana, Tasmania =

Loongana
- Town
- Coordinates: 41°24′39″S 145°57′46″E
- Country: Australia
- State: Tasmania
- Region: North-west and west
- LGA: Central Coast
- Location: 49 km (30 mi) SW of Ulverstone

Government
  - State electorate: Braddon
  - Federal division: Braddon

Population
  - Total: 16 (SAL 2021)
- Postcode: 7315
Localities around Loongana
Hampshire	Loyetea, Gunns Plains	South Preston
Guildford	Loongana	Nietta, South Preston, Moina, South Nietta
Guildford	Middlesex	Moina

Loongana is a rural locality in the local government area (LGA) of Central Coast in the North-west and west LGA region of Tasmania. The locality is about 49 kilometres (30 mi) south-west of the town of Ulverstone. The 2021 census recorded a population of 16 for the state suburb of Loongana.

== History ==
Loongana is a confirmed locality. The name was originally applied to a parish. By 1903 it was in use for the locality. It is believed to be an Aboriginal word for "run swiftly" or similar.

An alternative source of the name is from a ship which carried rescuers from Melbourne to assist at a mine disaster in 1912.

== Geography ==
The Leven River flows through from west to east and then forms much of the eastern boundary. The Leven Canyon is on this section of the river.

== Road infrastructure ==
Route C128 (Loongana Road) provides access to the locality.
