= Perth cable car =

Proposed cable car in Perth, Western Australia

The Perth cable car was a proposed aerial lift between the Elizabeth Quay waterfront area and Kings Park in Perth, Western Australia.

It was originally suggested in the early 1990s when Premier Carmen Lawrence offered a $50,000 prize for the best design. It was also mentioned by Colin Barnett in 2009 when the Elizabeth Quay project was in the early planning stages.

The proposal was reignited in March 2014 when Planning Minister John Day confirmed that the design was part of the Elizabeth Quay development, but not in the first stage of construction. The development was supported by the WA Tourism Council as a potential signature attraction for Perth.

The cost to build the cable car system was estimated to cost $30 million.

== See also ==
- Mount Wellington cable car proposals
- Mount Roland cable car
