= Upper Castra =

- Town
- Coordinates: 41°20′S 146°08′E
- Country: Australia
- State: Tasmania
- Region: North-west and west
- LGA: Central Coast Council
- Location: 289 km (180 mi) N of Hobart; 134 km (83 mi) W of Launceston; 35 km (22 mi) SW of Devonport; 24 km (15 mi) S of Ulverstone

Government
  - State electorate: Braddon
  - Federal division: Braddon

Population
  - Total: 85 (SAL 2021)
- Postcode: 7315
Localities around Upper Castra
Castra	Sprent, Castra	Lower Wilmot
South Preston, Preston, Castra	Upper Castra	Lower Wilmot
Nietta	Nietta, Wilmot	Wilmot

Upper Castra is a semi-rural locality in the local government area (LGA) of Central Coast in the North-west and west LGA region of Tasmania. The locality is about 23 kilometres (14 mi) south of the town of Ulverstone. The 2021 census recorded a population of 85 for Upper Castra.

== Etymology ==
The word castra is meant as "camp" in this context, and Upper Castra is so named because it is further inland from Castra.

== History ==
Upper Castra was gazetted as a locality in 1965.

Castra Road Upper Post Office opened on 1 June 1890 and closed in 1974.

== Geography ==
Upper Castra is connected to the Coast by Castra Road (State Route B15), which goes through the villages of Sprent, Spalford, Abbotsham and connects to Main Road in Ulverstone. It is bounded on the east by the Wilmot River (see Wilmot Power Station), to the south by Nietta and to the west by Preston and South Preston.

== Education ==
Historically, the local school was an important focus of the community.

The two nearest current primary schools are at Sprent and Wilmot and the nearest high school is Ulverstone High School. The Don College is the closest public college.
