= Reg Wright =

Australian politician

The Honourable Sir Reginald Wright
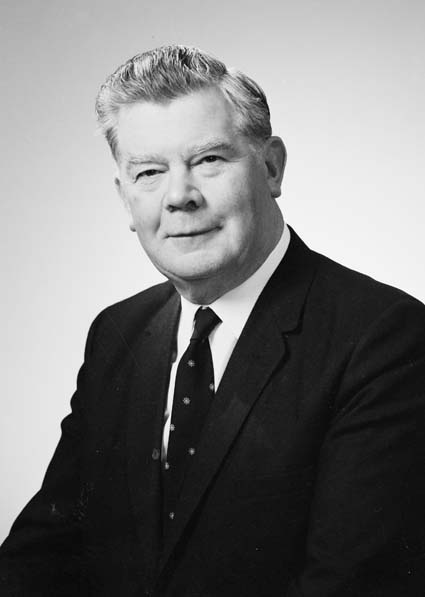

Minister for Works
- In office 28 February 1968 – 7 December 1972
- Prime Minister: John Gorton; William McMahon
- Preceded by: Bert Kelly
- Succeeded by: Jim Cavanagh

Minister in charge of Tourist Activities
- In office 28 February 1968 – 31 May 1971
- Prime Minister: John Gorton; William McMahon
- Preceded by: Don Chipp
- Succeeded by: Peter Howson

Senator for Tasmania
- In office 22 February 1950 – 30 June 1978

Personal details
- Born: 10 July 1905 Central Castra, Tasmania
- Died: 10 March 1990 (aged 84) Central Castra, Tasmania
- Party: Liberal (1950–78); Independent (1978)
- Relations: Sir Douglas Wright (brother); John Wright (brother); Anne Osborn Krueger (niece)
- Profession: Barrister

Sir Reginald Charles Wright (10 July 1905 – 10 March 1990) was an Australian barrister and politician. He was a member of the Liberal Party and served as a Senator for Tasmania from 1950 to 1978. He held ministerial office in the Gorton and McMahon governments, although he was known for crossing the floor.

== Early life ==
Wright was born in Central Castra, Tasmania in 1905. He was educated at Devonport High School and the University of Tasmania, where he earned a Bachelor of Arts and a Bachelor of Laws.

== Career ==
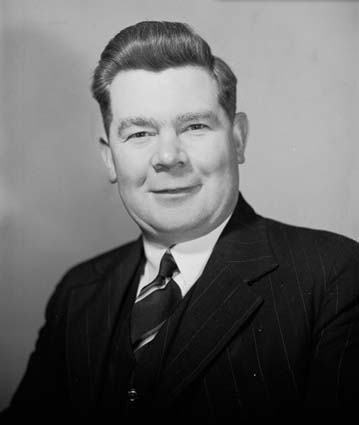
Wright in 1954.

Wright was admitted to the bar in 1928 and lectured in law at the University of Tasmania. In 1941, he enlisted in the second Australian Imperial Force and was promoted to captain in 1943.

Wright was elected as a Liberal member for the Tasmanian House of Assembly seat of Franklin in November 1946 and was the first State president of the Liberal Party in Tasmania. In November 1949, he resigned to enter federal politics. He was elected to the Senate at the 1949 election, taking his seat in February 1950. He was appointed to the ministry in February 1968 in the John Gorton government as Minister for Works and Minister in charge of Tourist Activities. He held these positions in the McMahon government, which was defeated at the 1972 election.

Wright holds the record in the Australian Parliament for "crossing the floor" to vote against his own party, which he did 150 times. He did not contest the 1977 election. He was knighted on 3 June 1978, for his services to the Tasmanian Parliament. He left the Liberal Party in June 1978 and sat as an independent until his retirement on 30 June.

== Later life ==
An accomplished barrister and orator, Wright returned to practising law on retiring from the Senate in 1978. In retirement he returned to a farm near the farmhouse in Castra where he had been born and died there; he was accorded a State Funeral in Ulverstone, Tasmania. His younger brother, Emeritus Professor Sir Douglas Wright AK was Chancellor of the University of Melbourne. He predeceased Reg by only ten days. His older brother, John Forsyth Wright was a Member of the House of Assembly in the Parliament of Tasmania.

Two of Sir Reginald's sons achieved distinction in the law. His youngest son, Philip Wright (1945–2021) was a magistrate in Hobart, while eldest son Christopher Wright AO is a King's Counsel, former Solicitor-General of Tasmania, former judge of the Supreme Court of Tasmania, former deputy president of the Administrative Appeals Tribunal and former head of Tasmania's Police Review Board.

Political offices
Preceded by Bert Kelly	Minister for Works; 1968–72	Succeeded by Gough Whitlam
Preceded by Don Chipp	Minister in Charge of Tourist Activities; 1968–71	Succeeded by Peter Howson
