= Mount Wellington cable car proposals =

Proposals for a cable car in Tasmania

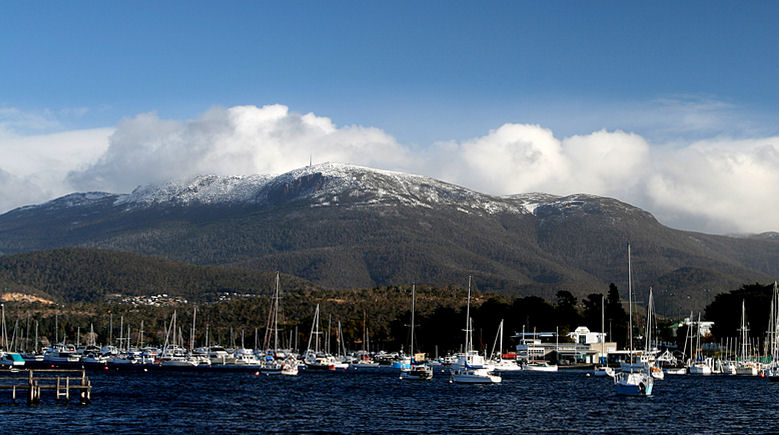
- kunanyi / Mount Wellington overlooking Hobart
- Location: Hobart, Tasmania, Australia
- Proposer: Arnold Wertheimer (1905–1906); Tim Burbury / Trinity Projects (1987–2004); Mount Wellington Cableway Company (2014–present)
- Project website: mtwellingtoncablecar.com
- Status: shelved
- Type: Aerial cableway and visitor centre
- Cost estimate: A$54 million (MWCC proposal, 2019)
- Start date: Not confirmed
- Completion date: Not confirmed
- Supporters: Mount Wellington Cableway Company; some tourism and business interests
- Opponents: Respect the Mountain – No Cable Car; conservation, resident and Aboriginal heritage interests
- Footnotes / references The most recent major proposal was refused by the Hobart City Council in 2021 and by the Tasmanian Civil and Administrative Tribunal on appeal in 2022.

Several Mount Wellington cable car proposals have been made for Kunanyi / Mount Wellington, the mountain overlooking Hobart, the capital of the Australian state of Tasmania, since the early 20th century. The proposals have generally been promoted as a means of improving tourist access to the summit, which rises to 1,271 m (4,170 ft) above sea level and is visible across much of Hobart. The idea has recurred repeatedly over more than a century, making the proposed aerial cableway a long-running and divisive issue in Hobart. The repeated proposals have made the cable car a familiar subject of Hobart public debate, comparable in local political longevity to Melbourne's long-proposed Doncaster railway line.

The most recent major proposal, by the Mount Wellington Cableway Company (MWCC), was refused by the Hobart City Council in 2021 and again on appeal by the Tasmanian Civil and Administrative Tribunal in 2022. The tribunal found that the proposal did not satisfy standards relating to noise, visual impact, geoheritage and biodiversity.

== Early proposals ==
A 1931 illustration from The Mercury depicting a proposed aerial tramway between The Springs and the Pinnacle on Mount Wellington.

The first two proposals predated the construction of Pinnacle Road. In 1905, Arnold Wertheimer proposed an aerial cableway (then described as an "aerial railway") from The Springs near the former Springs Hotel to the Pinnacle of Mount Wellington. In 1906, he established the Mount Wellington Aerial Railway Company Ltd.

The route was subsequently modified to run from Cascades to the Pinnacle, but the project did not proceed.

The concept was revived in 1931, when a proposal for an aerial tramway between The Springs and the Pinnacle was publicised. It proposed a nine-minute journey and included a kiosk and observation deck, with potential skiing facilities on the mountain's rear slopes.

After Pinnacle Road was completed in 1937, momentum for an aerial cableway declined because the summit became accessible by road. Later arguments for a cableway included access during periods of heavy snow and the growth of Tasmanian tourism.

== Burbury proposals ==
The next proposal was announced in 1987 by Hobart engineer Tim Burbury, through his company Trinity Projects. It proposed a cable car from Fern Tree to a hotel at the Pinnacle. Following substantial public opposition, the proposal was abandoned before detailed design.

In 1993, Burbury relaunched a revised proposal known as Skyway, estimated to cost A$31 million. Its base was moved to a hill near Cascade Brewery, and it proposed two high-capacity carriages. The Pinnacle hotel was replaced by a restaurant, and the proposal again included a ski field. It attracted opposition concerning privacy for nearby residents and impacts on the alpine environment.

Burbury announced a third revision in 2004. It proposed an alternative route, smaller gondolas rather than large carriages, a modified Pinnacle centre and removal of the ski field.

== Mount Wellington Cableway Company proposal ==
After Burbury's death in 2010, Hobart businessman Adrian Bold continued development of a cable car proposal. Following several years of advocacy, feasibility work and preliminary design, the Mount Wellington Cableway Company formally launched its proposal on 16 April 2014.

The proposal involved a two-stage route from Cascade Brewery to a visitor centre at the Pinnacle, including a restaurant, café and function centre. In November 2015, the project's Toronto-based partner, BullWheel International, announced that it no longer had any involvement in the proposal.

The proposal remained a prominent public and political issue during the following years.

== Planning and refusal ==
The proposal attracted opposition based on environmental, Aboriginal cultural heritage, visual and amenity concerns. Opposition was led in part by the South Hobart-based group Respect the Mountain – No Cable Car, while other community groups supported the proposal.

On 10 August 2018, a Hobart City Council committee voted against allocating public land for the project. On 27 July 2021, the full council voted against the project.

In 2022, the council refused the planning application, citing multiple grounds of non-compliance. MWCC appealed to the Tasmanian Civil and Administrative Tribunal (TASCAT). In November 2022, TASCAT dismissed the appeal and upheld the refusal, finding that the proposal did not meet required standards for noise, visual impact, geoheritage and biodiversity.

== Later developments ==
MWCC did not lodge a further planning application immediately after the TASCAT decision. The Tasmanian Government later conducted a strategic review of Kunanyi/Mount Wellington and Wellington Park. The resulting Kunanyi/Mount Wellington Action Plan, released in September 2026, did not take a position on a cable car, but recommended that a future management plan establish clear parameters for assessing future proposals.

MWCC welcomed completion of the review but did not confirm whether it would submit a new cable car proposal.

== See also ==
- Mount Roland cable car
- Perth cable car
