= Mersey Forest, Tasmania =

Mersey Forest
- Coordinates: 41°40′59″S 146°12′02″E
- Country: Australia
- State: Tasmania
- Region: North West
- LGA: Meander Valley, Kentish
- Location: 78 km (48 mi) SW of Devonport

Government
  - State electorate: Lyons
  - Federal division: Lyons

Population
  - Total: 0 (2016 census)
- Postcode: 7304
Localities around Mersey Forest
Lorinna	Liena	Mayberry
Cradle Mountain-Lake St Clair National Park	Mersey Forest	Central Plateau Conservation Area
Cradle Mountain-Lake St Clair NP	Walls of Jerusalem National Park	Walls of Jerusalem NP

Mersey Forest is a locality in the local government areas of Meander Valley and Kentish in the North West region of Tasmania. It is located about 78 kilometres (48 mi) south-west of the town of Devonport. The 2016 census determined a population of zero for the state suburb of Mersey Forest.

== History ==
The Mersey River is believed to have been named in 1826 after the River Mersey in England. It is assumed that the locality was named for the river.

== Geography ==
The Mersey River passes through the centre of the locality from south to north. The Rowallan Power Station and its associated Rowallan Dam and Lake Rowallan are on the river in the southern part. The majority of the locality consists of forest reserves, and it is adjoined on the west, south and east by national parks and conservation areas.

== Road infrastructure ==
The C138 route (Mersey Forest Road) enters the locality from the north-east, before turning north-west and exiting as Oliver's Road. Mersey Forest Road continues south as Route C171 to Rowallan Dam. It then continues further south with no route number, providing access to the Walls of Jerusalem car park and beyond.
