= Acacia Hills, Tasmania =

Acacia Hills
- Town
- Coordinates: 41°17′07″S 146°20′32″E
- Country: Australia
- State: Tasmania
- Region: North West
- LGA: Kentish
- Location: 16 km (9.9 mi) S of Devonport

Government
  - State electorate: Lyons
  - Federal division: Lyons

Population
  - Total: 729 (2021 census)
- Postcode: 7306
Localities around Acacia Hills
Melrose	Aberdeen	South Spreyton
Lower Barrington	Acacia Hills	Latrobe
Barrington	Nook	Railton

Acacia Hills is a locality and small rural community in the local government area of Kentish in the North West region of Tasmania. It is located about 16 kilometres (9.9 mi) south of the city of Devonport. The 2021 census recorded a population of 729 for Acacia Hills.

== Geography ==
The Don River, forms the south-western and western boundaries. Bonneys Tier Forest Reserve is in the south-east of the locality.

== Road infrastructure ==
The B14 route (Sheffield Road) enters the locality from the north and exits to the west. The C150 route (Nook Road) starts at an intersection with route B14 and exits to the south.
