= Barrington, Tasmania =

Barrington
- Town
- Coordinates: 41°19′54″S 146°16′48″E
- Country: Australia
- State: Tasmania
- Region: North West
- LGA: Kentish
- Location: 21 km (13 mi) SW of Devonport

Government
  - State electorate: Lyons
  - Federal division: Lyons

Population
  - Total: 197 (2016 census)
- Postcode: 7306
Localities around Barrington
| Lower Wilmot | Lower Barrington | Acacia Hills |
| Lower Wilmot | Barrington | Nook |
| Nowhere Else | Sheffield | Sheffield |

Barrington is a locality and small rural community in the local government area of Kentish in the North West region of Tasmania. It is located about 21 kilometres (13 mi) south-west of the town of Devonport. The 2016 census determined a population of 197 for the state suburb of Barrington.

== History ==
The name "Barrington" was originally applied to a parish in or before 1855. It was gazetted as a locality in 1965.

== Geography ==
The Forth River, forms the south-western and western boundaries, while the Don River forms most of the eastern boundary.

== Road infrastructure ==
The B14 route (Sheffield Road) enters the locality from the north and exits to the south-east. The C143 route (Barrington Road) starts at an intersection with route B14 and exits to the south.
