= Kentish Council =

- Local government area
- Interactive map of Kentish Council
- Coordinates: 41.4539°S 146.1837°E
- Country: Australia
- State: Tasmania
- Region: Sheffield and Cradle Mountain area
- Established: 1 January 1907
- Council seat: Sheffield

Government
  - Mayor: Kate Haberle
  - State electorate: Lyons
  - Federal division: Lyons

Area
  - Total: 1,156 km^{2} (446 sq mi)

Population
  - Total: 6,324 (2018)
  - Density: 5.4706/km^{2} (14.169/sq mi)
- Website: Kentish Council
LGAs around Kentish Council
Central Coast	Devonport	Latrobe
Waratah-Wynyard	Kentish Council	Meander Valley
West Coast	Meander Valley	Meander Valley

Kentish Council is a local government body in Tasmania, situated in the north-west of the state, to the south and inland from Devonport. Kentish is classified as a rural local government area and has a population of 6,324, the major towns of the municipality are Sheffield, Railton and Wilmot.

== History and attributes ==
The area was explored by the surveyor Nathaniel Kentish in 1842 who was given the task of finding a route from Deloraine through to Tasmania's north west coast. Kentish's last name has remained as the name of the area. The municipality was established on 1 January 1907. Kentish is classified as rural, agricultural and large (RAL) under the Australian Classification of Local Governments.

The area is a high-tourism region. Attractions include Cradle Mountain, Lake Barrington and the mural town of Sheffield.

== Current composition ==
Name	Position	Party
Kate Haberle	Mayor	Independent
Penny Lane	Deputy Mayor	Independent
Phillip Richards	Councillor	Independent
Rodney Blenkhorn	Councillor	Independent
Phil Dickinson	Councillor	Independent
Linda Cassidy	Councillor	Independent
Simone Haigh	Councillor	Independent
Don Thwaites	Councillor	Independent
Terry Hughes	Councillor	Independent

== Suburbs ==
Data from the Australian 2016 census:

Suburb	Census population 2016	Reason
Acacia Hills	623	
Lower Barrington	238	
Barrington	197	
Nook	188	
Sheffield	1,552	Includes Kentish
Lower Wilmot	115	
Wilmot	298	Includes Narrawa
Narrawa		Incl. in Wilmot
Dulverton		Incl. Railton
Railton	997	Includes Dulverton
Sunnyside	104	
Stoodley	48	
Beulah	79	
Lower Beulah	55	
Paradise	112	
Claude Road	257	
Kentish		Incl. in Sheffield
West Kentish	165	
Gowrie Park	32	
Roland	83	
Mount Roland	0	
Lorinna	77	
Middlesex	4	
Moina	31	
Cethana	0	
Erriba	47	
Staverton	88	
Promised Land	44	
Nowhere Else	40	
Total	5,474	
	654	Variance
Local government total	6,128	Gazetted Kentish local government area

=== Missing from above list ===
- Cradle Mountain
- Kimberley
- Latrobe
- Liena
- Melrose
- Merseylea
- Mersey Forest
- Paloona
- South Nietta
- South Spreyton
- Weegena
- West Coast

== See also ==
- List of local government areas of Tasmania
