= Beulah, Tasmania =

Beulah Tasmania
- Coordinates: 41°27′3.25″S 146°22′41.99″E
- Population: 79 (2016 census)
- LGA(s): Kentish Council
- State electorate(s): Lyons
- Federal division(s): Lyons

Beulah (Australian postcode 7306) is a small township on the north-west coast of Tasmania south of Devonport, Tasmania, under the foothills of Mount Roland, Tasmania. The closest town of consequence is Sheffield, Tasmania.

The hamlet of Lower Beulah lies, perversely, higher up the foothills of Mount Roland, to the south of the main township.

== Sport ==
Beulah has one of the oldest cricket clubs in Tasmania. The Beulah Bushrangers Cricket Club was founded in 1896, Cricket was played in the Beulah area and surrounding districts prior to this. The side during the 1930s consisted of a team made up from the one family. It was the Dawkins family who had lived at Beulah made up this side. Brothers Lewis, Cecil Dawkins who played for Beulah club into their 50s and competed in the Roland Cricket Association and the Kentish Cricket Association with Beulah from the early 1930s until the 1950s when the club went into recess. Beulah won the inaugural Kentish Cricket Association A Grade Premiership in 1946. The Club was reformed in 1979–80 season competing in the Kentish Association by Craig T Davey and Grant Youd after a 26 year recess. A golden age occurred at the club during the 80s with the team winning flags in 1987, 1988, and 1989 predominantly under the leadership of Brendon Davey. The young team was very strong in the batting department scoring over 400 runs from 50 overs on 7 occasions throughout the latter part of the decade. In 2003 a seasoned Beulah outfit won its last premiership in Kentish. The club continued until 2004 when it went into recess after the folding of the KCA. The club reformed in 2010–2011 in the Mersey Valley Cricket Association with A reserve and B grade teams.
