= Promised Land, Tasmania =

Promised Land
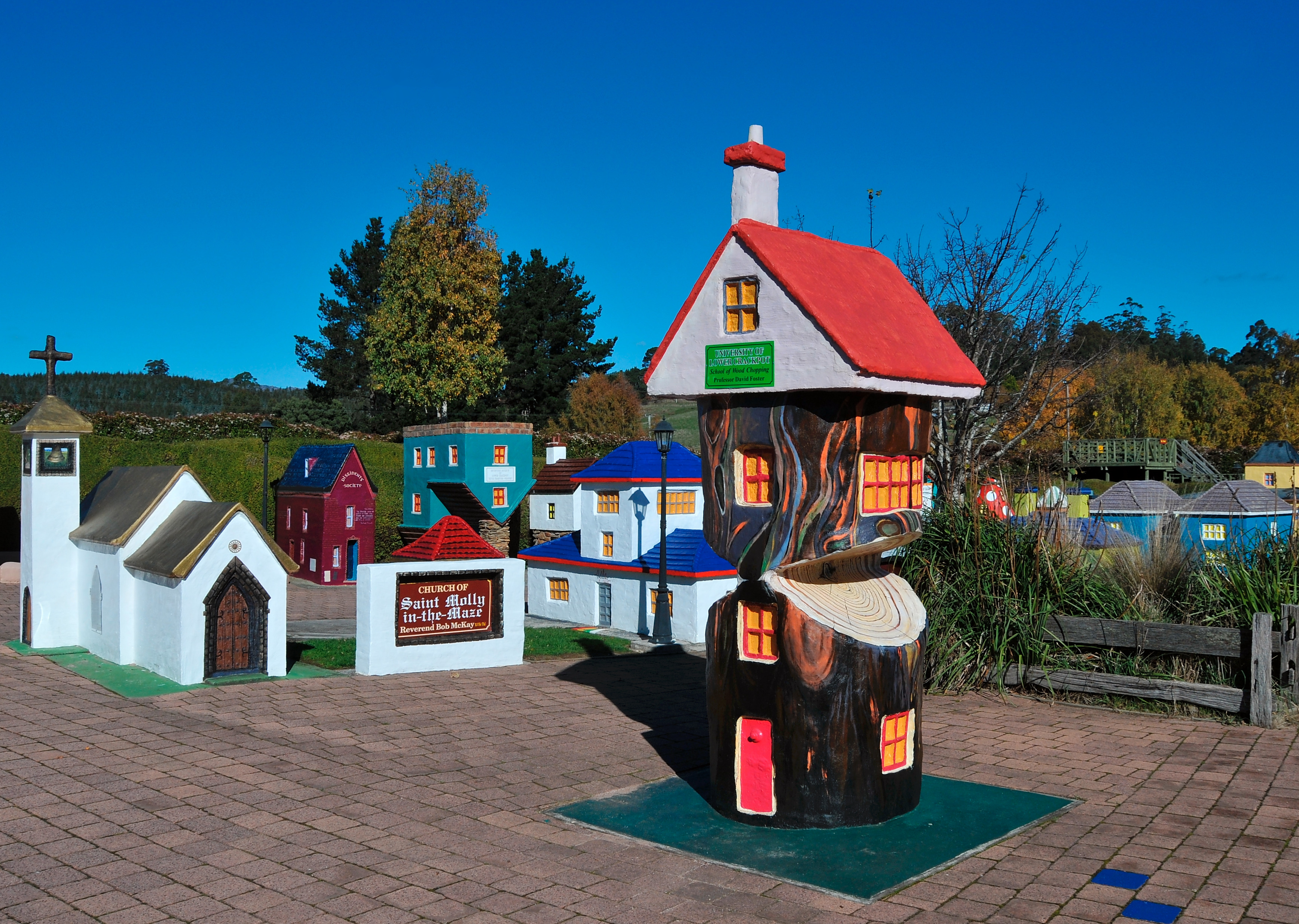
- Lower crackpot, 7308 at Promised Land, Tasmania

- Coordinates: 41°23′S 146°20′E
- Country: Australia
- State: Tasmania
- Region: North-west and west
- LGA: Kentish Council
- Location: 184 km (114 mi) NW of Hobart; 66 km (41 mi) W of Launceston; 23 km (14 mi) S of Devonport; 13 km (8.1 mi) SW of Sheffield
- Established: 1859

Government
  - State electorate: Lyons
  - Federal division: Lyons
- Elevation: 280 m (920 ft)

Population
  - Total: 44 (2016 census)
- Mean max temp: 19.2 °C (66.6 °F)
- Mean min temp: 8.7 °C (47.7 °F)
- Annual rainfall: 1,179.1 mm (46.42 in)
Localities around Promised Land
Lake Barrington	Roland	Roland
Lake Barrington	Promised Land	Roland, Gowrie Park
Staverton	Staverton	Gowrie Park

Promised Land is a rural locality in the local government area (LGA) of Kentish in the North-west and west LGA region of Tasmania. The locality is about 13 kilometres (8.1 mi) south-west of the town of Sheffield. The 2016 census recorded a population of 44 for the state suburb of Promised Land.

== History ==
Promised Land was gazetted as a locality in 1957.

== Geography ==
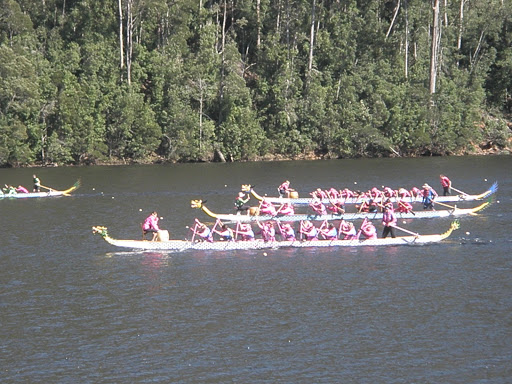
Racing on Lake Barrington, Promised land

The waters of Lake Barrington form the western boundary.

== Road infrastructure ==
Route C140 (Staverton Road) passes through from north-east to south.
