= Castra, Tasmania =

Castra
- Town
- Coordinates: 41°20′00″S 146°08′00″E
- Country: Australia
- State: Tasmania
- Region: North-west and west
- LGA: Central Coast
- Location: 19 km (12 mi) S of Ulverstone

Government
  - State electorate: Braddon
  - Federal division: Braddon

Population
  - Total: 41 (SAL 2021)
- Postcode: 7315
Localities around Castra
Preston	Preston, Sprent, Gawler	Sprent
Preston	Castra	Upper Castra, Sprent
Preston	Upper Castra	Upper Castra

Castra is a rural locality in the local government area (LGA) of Central Coast in the North-west and west LGA region of Tasmania. The locality is about 19 kilometres (12 mi) south of the town of Ulverstone. The 2021 census recorded a population of 41 for Castra.

== History ==
Castra was established and named by Andrew Crawford, a former officer in the Indian Army who had immigrated to Tasmania in 1864. He promoted a soldier settlement scheme for Anglo-Indians and successfully lobbied the Parliament of Tasmania to reserve land. He established Castra & Co. in Bombay and selected 9,700 acres (3,900 ha) at Castra. Around 40 individuals took up allotments, with only half remaining by 1880 and only Crawford and his family remaining at Castra by 1890. Many participants settled elsewhere in north-west Tasmania.

== Geography ==
Most of the boundaries are survey lines.

== Road infrastructure ==
Route C124 (Central Castra Road) passes through from north to south.
