= Preston, Tasmania =

Preston Tasmania
- Coordinates: 41.280°S 146.070°E
- Population: 149 (SAL 2021)
- Postcode(s): 7315
- Location: 207 km (129 mi) NE of Hobart; 136 km (85 mi) NW of Launceston; 17 km (11 mi) SW of Forth; 19 km (12 mi) S of Ulverstone
- LGA(s): Central Coast Council
- State electorate(s): Braddon
- Federal division(s): Braddon
Mean max temp	Mean min temp	Annual rainfall
29.0 °C; 84 °F	-1.6 °C; 29 °F	983 mm 38.7 in

Preston is a village located in the Central Coast Council municipal area, near Upper Castra and Ulverstone in the North West region of Tasmania, Australia. The 2021 census recorded a population of 149 for the state suburb of Preston.

== History ==
Preston Post Office opened on 1 October 1896 and closed in 1981.

== Geography ==
Preston is located within the Braddon Division. It is connected to the west by Upper Castra by Preston Road and Castra Road, which goes through the village of Leport and connects to the main road in Ulverstone. It is about 13.1 kilometres (8.1 mi) from Gawler and 17.8 kilometres (11.1 mi) from Forth. It is bounded on the east by the Wilmot River (see Wilmot Power Station). The weather of Preston is generally mild.

=== Preston Falls ===
Preston Falls is a tall and slender 25-metre (82 ft) plunge waterfall located above the Gunns Plains. The waterfall is a short drive from Ulverstone that is approximately 20 kilometres (12 mi) west of Devonport or 28 kilometres (17 mi) east of Burnie on the Bass Highway.

== Education ==
Preston Primary School is in the village but is now a private residence after being closed by the board of education in 1994 after an attempt by the community to save the school. however the nearest high school is Ulverstone High School. The Don College is the closest public college.
