= Devils Gate Dam =

Dam and power station and dam in Tasmania, Australia

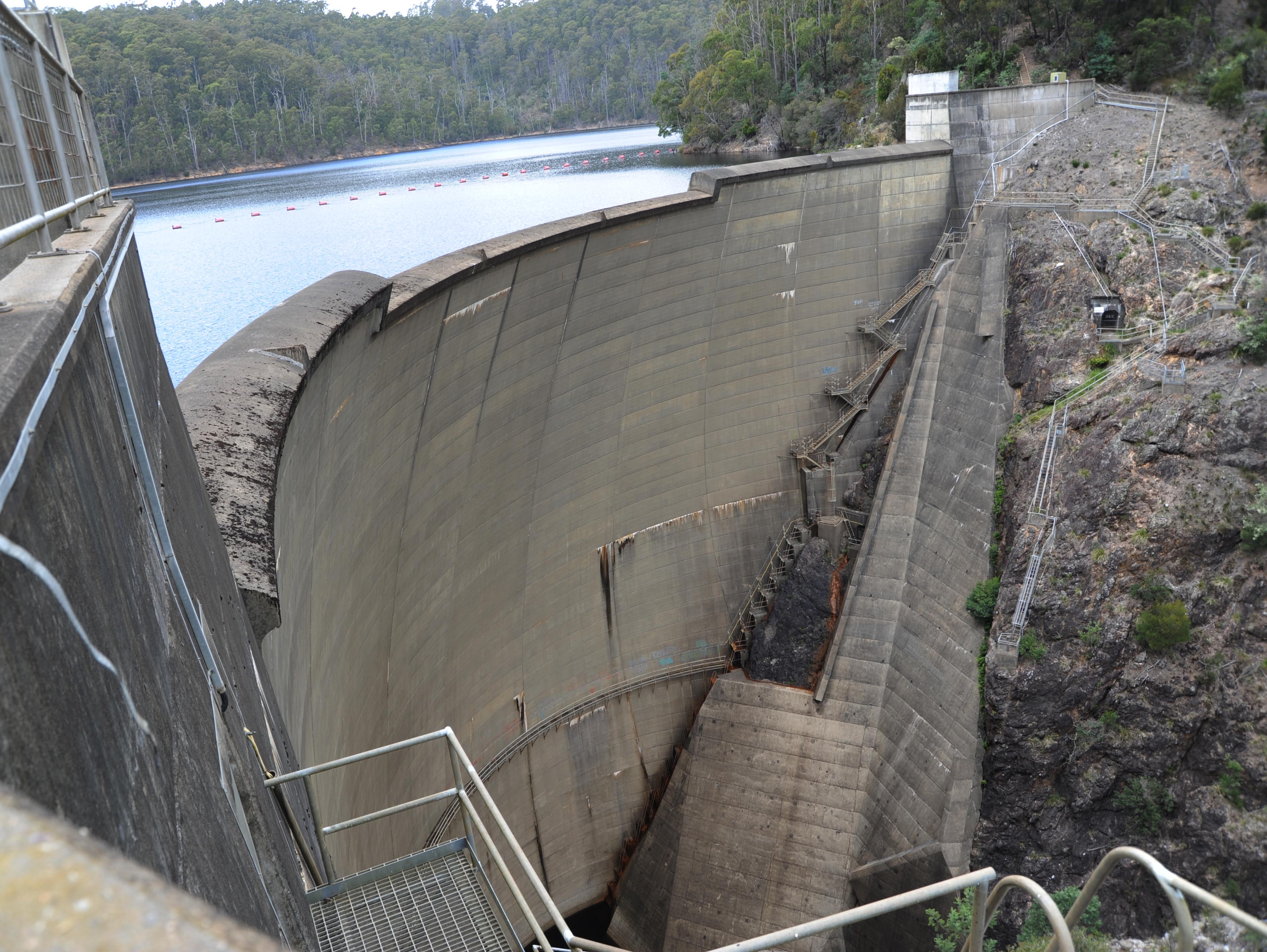
- The double-arch dam wall

- Location of the dam in Tasmania
- Interactive map of Devils Gate Dam
- Country: Australia
- Location: Northern Tasmania
- Coordinates: 41°21′02″S 146°15′56″E
- Purpose: Power
- Status: Operational
- Opening date: 1969
- Owner: Hydro Tasmania

Dam and spillways
- Type of dam: Arch dam
- Impounds: Forth River
- Height: 84 m (276 ft)
- Length: 134 m (440 ft)
- Dam volume: 31×10^{3} m^{3} (1.1×10^{6} cu ft)
- Spillways: 1
- Spillway type: Uncontrolled
- Spillway capacity: 2,040 m^{3}/s (72,000 cu ft/s)

Reservoir
- Creates: Lake Barrington
- Total capacity: 179.94 GL (145,880 acre⋅ft)
- Catchment area: 742 km^{2} (286 sq mi)
- Surface area: 66.5 ha (164 acres)
- Maximum length: 20 km (12 mi)
- Normal elevation: 119 m (390 ft) AHD

Devils Gate Power Station
- Operator: Hydro Tasmania
- Commission date: 1969
- Type: Run-of-the-river
- Hydraulic head: 68 m (223 ft)
- Turbines: 1 x 63 MW (84,000 hp); Boving Francis-type
- Installed capacity: 63 MW (84,000 hp)
- Capacity factor: 0.8
- Annual generation: 314 GWh (1,130 TJ)
- Website hydro.com.au

The Devils Gate Dam is a concrete double-arch dam across the Forth River, located near Barrington, in northern Tasmania, Australia. Completed in 1969, the resultant reservoir, Lake Barrington, was established for the purpose of generation of hydroelectricity via the adjacent Devils Gate Power Station, a run-of-the-river hydroelectric power station.

The dam, its reservoir, and the power station are owned and operated by Hydro Tasmania.

== Dam and reservoir overview ==
The concrete dam wall is 84 metres (276 ft) high and 134 metres (440 ft) long. When full, Lake Rosebery has capacity of 179.94 gigalitres (145,880 acre⋅ft) and covers 66.5 hectares (164 acres), drawn from a catchment area of 742 square kilometres (286 sq mi). The uncontrolled spillway has a flow capacity of 2,040 cubic metres per second (72,000 cu ft/s). It is one of the thinnest concrete arch dams in the world.

The dam received a Historic Engineering Marker from Engineers Australia as part of its Engineering Heritage Recognition Program.

=== Reservoir ===
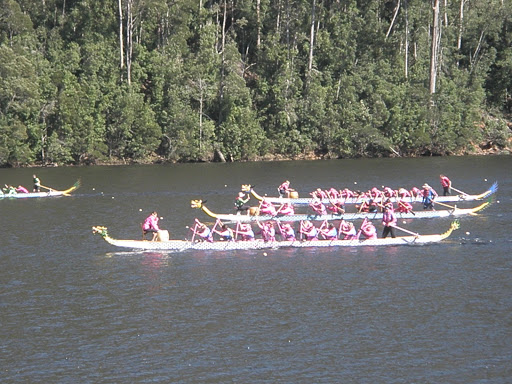
Dragonboating on Lake the reservoir

The reservoir's foreshore is protected by the Tasmanian Government as a natural recreation area.

Lake Barrington is a world-standard rowing course. It hosted the 1990 World Rowing Championships and several Australian Rowing Championships in 1984, 1987, 1990, 1994, 1997, 2003, 2006, 2009, and 2021. The reservoir is also a location for the annual Tasmanian schools Head of the River rowing regatta.

Two water ski clubs are based at Lake Barrington; the Kentish Aquatic Club and the Horsehead Water Ski Club.

== Hydroelectric power station ==
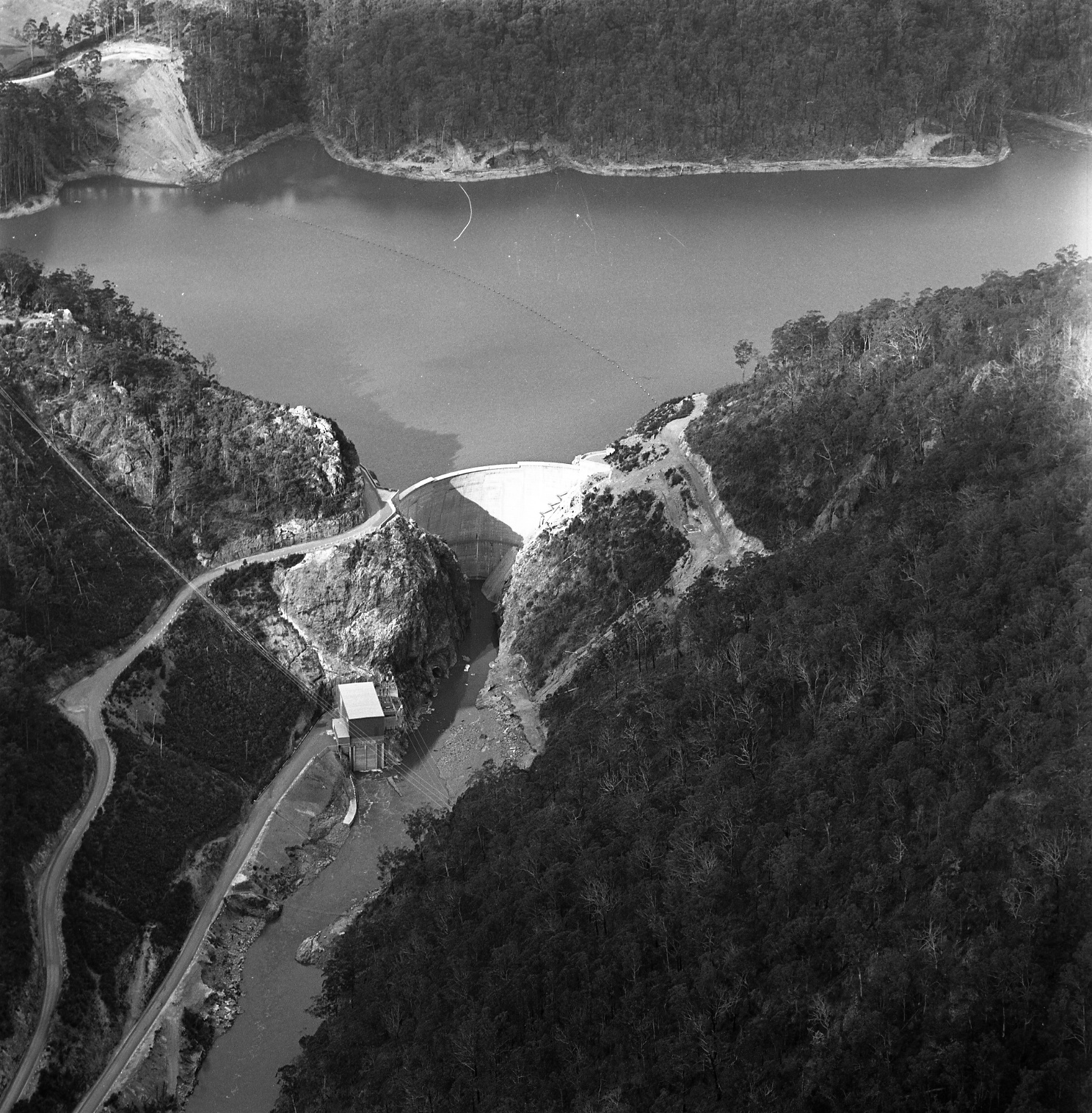
Aerial view of the dam, in 1972. (Source: Tasmanian Archive and Heritage Office)

The Devils Gate Power Station is part of the Mersey–Forth scheme that comprises seven run-of-the-river hydroelectric power stations and one mini-hydro power station. The seventh station in the scheme, the Devils Gate Power Station is located below the dam wall. Water from Barrington Lake is fed to the power station by a 150-metre (490 ft) single penstock tunnel.

The power station was commissioned in 1969 by the Hydro Electric Corporation and has one Boving Fracis-type turbine, with a generating capacity of 63 megawatts (84,000 hp). The station output, estimated to be 314 gigawatt-hours (1,130 TJ) annually, is fed to TasNetworks' transmission grid via an 11 kV/110 kV Siemens generator transformer to the outdoor switchyard.

== See also ==
- List of power stations in Tasmania
- List of reservoirs and dams in Tasmania
- List of locations and events of the Australian Rowing Championships
- List of run-of-the-river hydroelectric power stations
