= Moina, Tasmania =

Moina Tasmania
- Coordinates: 41°48′S 146°07′E
- Population: 31 (2016 census)
- Location: 278 km (173 mi) NW of Hobart
- LGA(s): Kentish Council
- State electorate(s): Lyons
- Federal division(s): Lyons

Moina is a town 45 km inland from Devonport on the north-west coast of Tasmania, Australia. Moina was the site of a brief gold rush in the late nineteenth century and then one of the largest wolfram and bismuth mines in Tasmania. It has been the centre of continued mineral exploration in the Middlesex district since the first discoveries of tin and tungsten ores on Dolcoath Hill in the 1890s. The name may be a derivation of a small crustacean of the same name found in Tasmanian waters.

== Mining ==
James Smith, discoverer of Mount Bischoff tin mine, was the first European to traverse the Forth & Wilmot Rivers. Along with J. Jones and J. Johnson, he prospected along the Forth River in around 1859. Malcolm Campbell discovered the Mount Bell gold mine, near Moina, in 1892, where 100 men were at work soon after. The Shepherd and Murphy, later referred to as the S & M or Moina Tungsten-Tin mine, contributed the greatest part of the total production of tin, tungsten and bismuth from the Moina and Round Mount districts. During periods of intermittent production between 1893 and 1957, an estimated 525t Sn, 255t W03 and 71t Bi have been recovered from the underground and surface workings at this mine.

Moina Post Office opened on 1 January 1910 and closed in 1958.

== Cradle Mountain ==
Moina is the last service town before Cradle Mountain which is approximately twenty minutes drive south.

== Lake Gairdner ==
Lake Gairdner is located just north west of Moina, part of the Mersey-Forth Hydro electric Scheme. The lake supplies water to the Wilmot Power Station on the foreshore of Lake Cethana. The power station was commissioned in 1971 and houses a single Fuji Francis turbine coupled to a Siemens generator.
