= Railton, Tasmania =

Railton
- Town
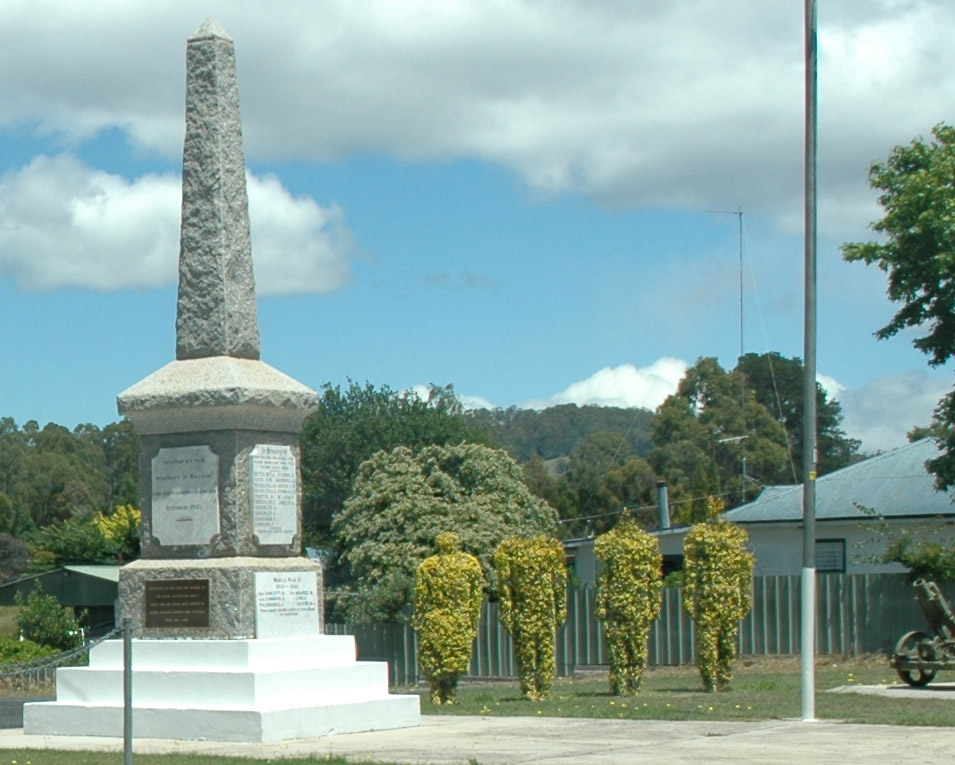
- Topiary in Railton

- Coordinates: 41°21′S 146°25′E
- Country: Australia
- State: Tasmania
- LGA: Kentish Council
- Location: 186 km (116 mi) NW of Hobart; 58 km (36 mi) W of Launceston; 19 km (12 mi) S of Devonport

Government
  - State electorate: Lyons
  - Federal division: Lyons
- Elevation: 65 m (213 ft)

Population
  - Total: 997 (2016 census)

Railton is a town situated 20 km inland from Devonport on the north-west coast of Tasmania, Australia's island state. In the 2016 census, Railton had a population of 997. The locality is in the Kentish Council area, but with about 1% in the Latrobe LGA.

== History ==
Railton was first surveyed in 1853 and a railway line through the town from Deloraine to Latrobe was completed in 1885. Early settlers who were mainly farmers and timber workers lived in slab huts. The new settlers quickly drove out the traditional owners of the area. The wider main street was built for the drovers mustering cattle to the railway station to be loaded for export. By the 1900s Railton had a flourishing timber trade with 2 sawmills.

Railton has several topiaries in various locations around the town. Visit the "Town of Topiary" website for information on how to find them.

Railton promotes itself as the "Town of Topiary".

Railton is home to a Cement Australia plant which began operations in 1923. It was previously known as Goliath Cement.

== Facilities ==
Railton is very popular for mountain bike riding with many tracks around the entire area, a playground park with bbq areas, squash courts, lawn bowls, a neighbourhood centre, a caravan park, public toilets, a town hall and a primary school.

Railton Primary School is a campus of Sheffield School. (years P-4).

== Sykes Sanctuary ==
Sykes Sanctuary is 40 acres (160,000 m^{2}) of bush land bequeathed by Norman Sykes to the Railton community with the instruction that it be conserved as a bird and fauna sanctuary. Sykes was an eccentric conservationist who gave up city life to live in a small shack, close to nature.
