= Mount Roland Conservation Area =

Mountain in north west Tasmania, Australia

Mount Roland
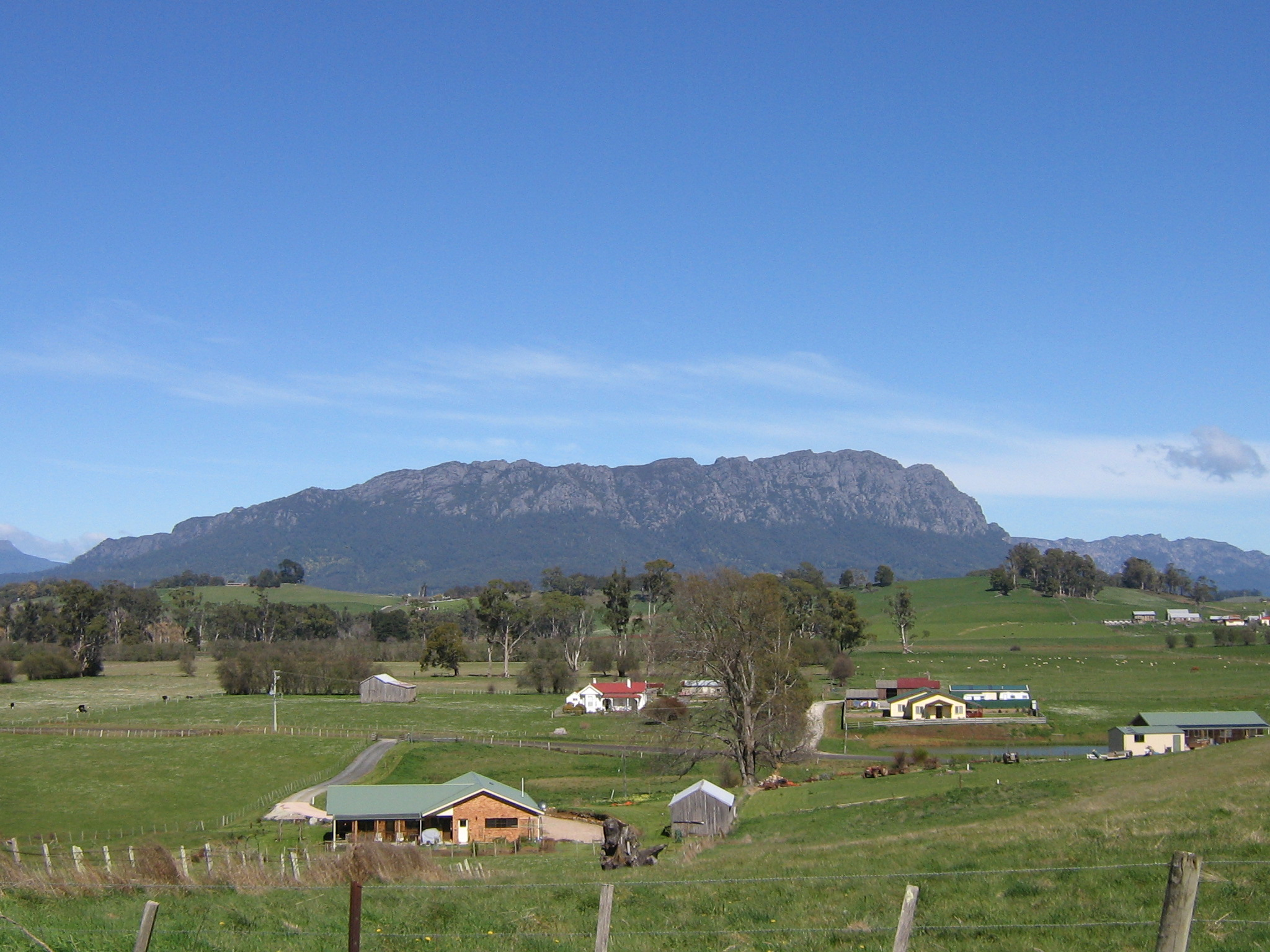
- Mount Roland from the lookout at Sheffield

Highest point
- Elevation: 1,234 m (4,049 ft)AHD
- Prominence: 563 m (1,847 ft)
- Listing: List of highest mountains of Tasmania
- Coordinates: 41°27′35″S 146°15′35″E

Geography
- Location within Tasmania
- Location: North West Tasmania, Australia

Geology
- Rock age: Jurassic
- Mountain type: Dolerite

Mount Roland is a locality, a mountain, and a conservation area in the north west coast region of Tasmania, Australia.

The mountain is near the town of Sheffield. The peak rises to 1,234 metres (4,049 ft) above sea level and there are a number of well-marked bushwalks suitable for exercise. Mount Roland has two walking routes to the summit. The main track begins near Gowrie Park, while a steeper route approaches from Kings Road near Claude Road.

A Mount Roland cable car has been proposed for the mountain on several occasions. The proposal has attracted both support and opposition within the local community.

The locality of Mount Roland is a rural locality in the local government areas of Meander Valley and Kentish in the Launceston and North and north-west regions of Tasmania. The locality is about 75 kilometres (47 mi) west of the town of Westbury. The 2016 census recorded a population of nil for the state suburb of Mount Roland. Mount Roland is a confirmed locality.

The Mersey River forms part of the southern boundary. The Mount Roland Conservation Area occupies a small area in the north of the locality. Route C136 (Claude Road) runs through the north-east corner of the locality. Route C138 (Olivers Road) enters from the north-west and runs south until it exits.

== See also ==
- List of highest mountains of Tasmania
