= North West Tasmania =

- Region
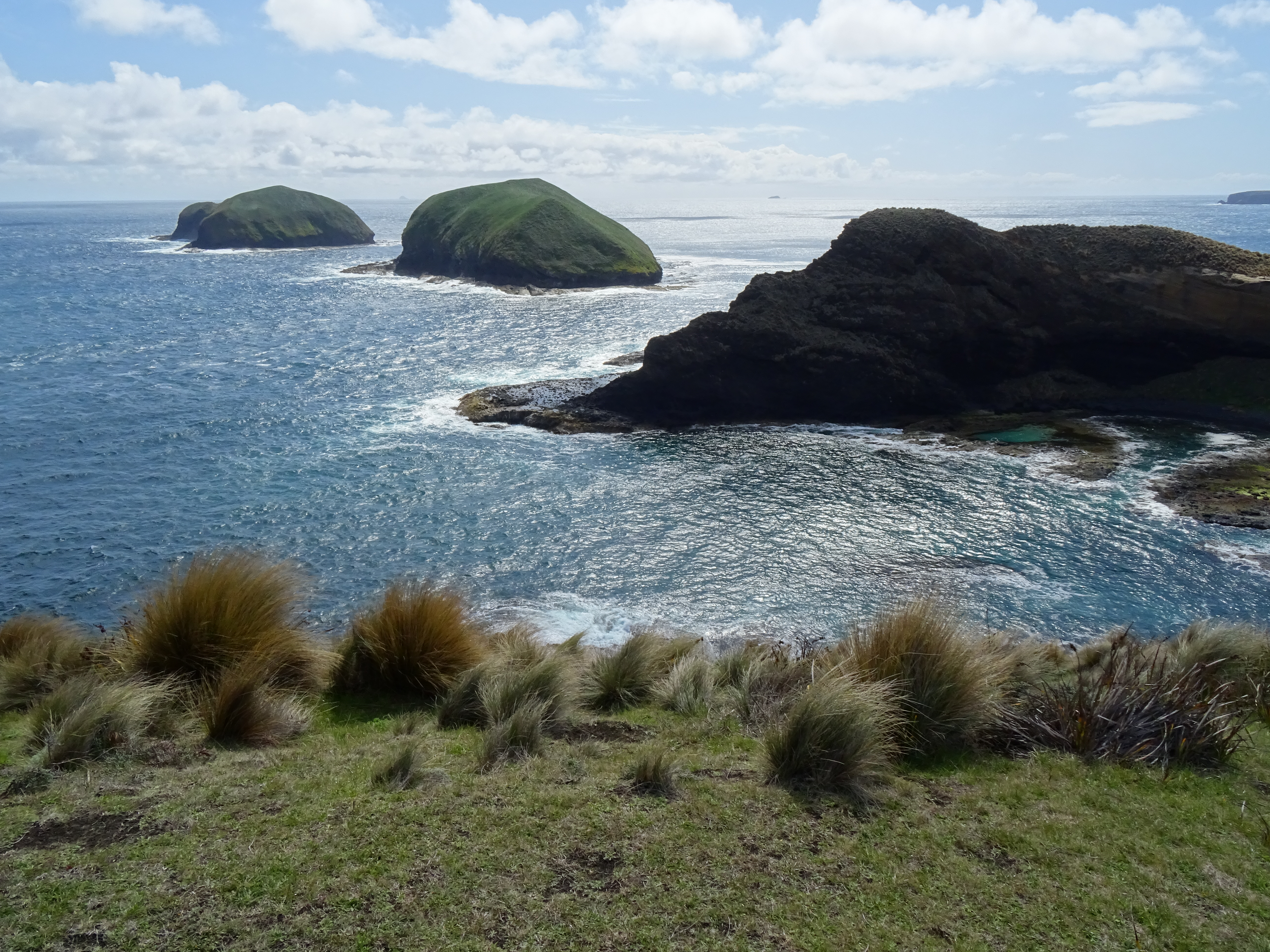
- Koindrim / the Doughboys off Kennaook / Cape Grim.

- Coordinates: 41.1°S 145.2°E
- Country: Australia
- State: Tasmania
- LGAs: Burnie, Circular Head; Devonport, Kentish, King Island; Latrobe, Waratah-Wynyard, West Coast

Government
  - State electorate: Lyons, Braddon
  - Federal division: Lyons, Braddon

Population
  - Total: 113,834
Regions around North West Tasmania
Bass Strait	Bass Strait	Bass Strait
Southern Ocean	North West Tasmania	Northern Tasmania
Southern Ocean	South West Tasmania	Central Highlands

North West Tasmania is one of the regions of Tasmania in Australia. The region comprises the whole of the north west, including the North West Coast and the northern reaches of the West Coast. It is usually accepted as extending as far south as the Pieman River and including the Savage River National Park within the Tarkine region.

The region is characterised by its rugged beauty, from coastlines to agricultural lands. It is a key gateway for the MS Spirit of Tasmania II ferry, which docks at Devonport.

== North West Coast ==
The North West Coast is a region of Tasmania on the north coast of Tasmania to the west of Port Sorell, Tasmania. It includes towns such as Devonport, Burnie, Wynyard, Ulverstone, Penguin, Smithton and Stanley. The water to the north is called Bass Strait.

North-West and West Tasmania Area Profile July 2016

- The gross regional product is $5.29 billion – the highest it has been in the last 10 years. In comparison, the gross regional product of Tasmania is $24,707 billion.
- The population is 113,834.
- 51,526 people are employed (this figure has been steady since 2009).
- About 70,600 people are working age (between 15 and 64).
- There are 51,724 local jobs and 7,618 local businesses.
- The employment rate for people between 15 and 64 years of age is 71.1%
- The employment participation rate (15 and above) is 59.6%
- The unemployment rate (15 and above) is 6.84% (the lowest since March 2012). The national average is 5.8%.
- The youth unemployment rate (ages 15 to 24) is 12.0%. The national average is 12.2% (this has been decreasing since December 2014).
- The largest employment industries, accounting for 38.5% (19,936) of the workforce, are manufacturing (7,065 people or 13.7%), retail trade (6,897 people or 13.3%) and health care and social assistance (5,974 people or 11.6%).

== Cradle Coast ==
The region is characterised by some as 'Cradle to Coast' as a reference to the World Heritage listed icon Cradle Mountain. The region stretches from the coastline inland to rugged mountain areas.

The term Cradle Coast is also the name of a regional local government authority within this region – The Cradle Coast Authority (CCA) which is a joint authority formed under the Tasmanian Local Government Act (1993) by the local government councils of Burnie City, Central Coast, Circular Head, Devonport City, Kentish, King Island, Latrobe, Waratah-Wynyard and West Coast (the participating Councils). The Cradle Coast region comprises the combined areas of the CCA's participating councils. The CCA is governed by a two-tiered structure comprising two representatives from each participating council (the Representatives) and a skills-based board of directors (the Board). The CCA was established by the nine Local Government Councils of North West Tasmania to represent and advocate the needs of the region. The CCA collaborates and facilitates a diverse range of projects and initiatives involving all tiers of government, industry and the community, by operating under three focus areas: Regional Economic Development, Natural Resource Management and Tourism.

== COVID-19 pandemic ==
The region was a site of particularly severe disruption during the autumn 2020 COVID-19 pandemic in Australia. Two hospitals in Burnie, North West Regional Hospital (NWRH) and North West Private Hospital, were closed when an outbreak of the virus occurred among the staff. The emergency department at the NWRH was staffed by Australian Defence Force personnel for two weeks while the usual staff were under a mandatory 14 day quarantine after exposure to the virus.

As of 29 April 2020 there had been at least 12 deaths from COVID-19 in the region, out of a total of 13 statewide.
