= Sheffield, Tasmania =

Sheffield
- Town
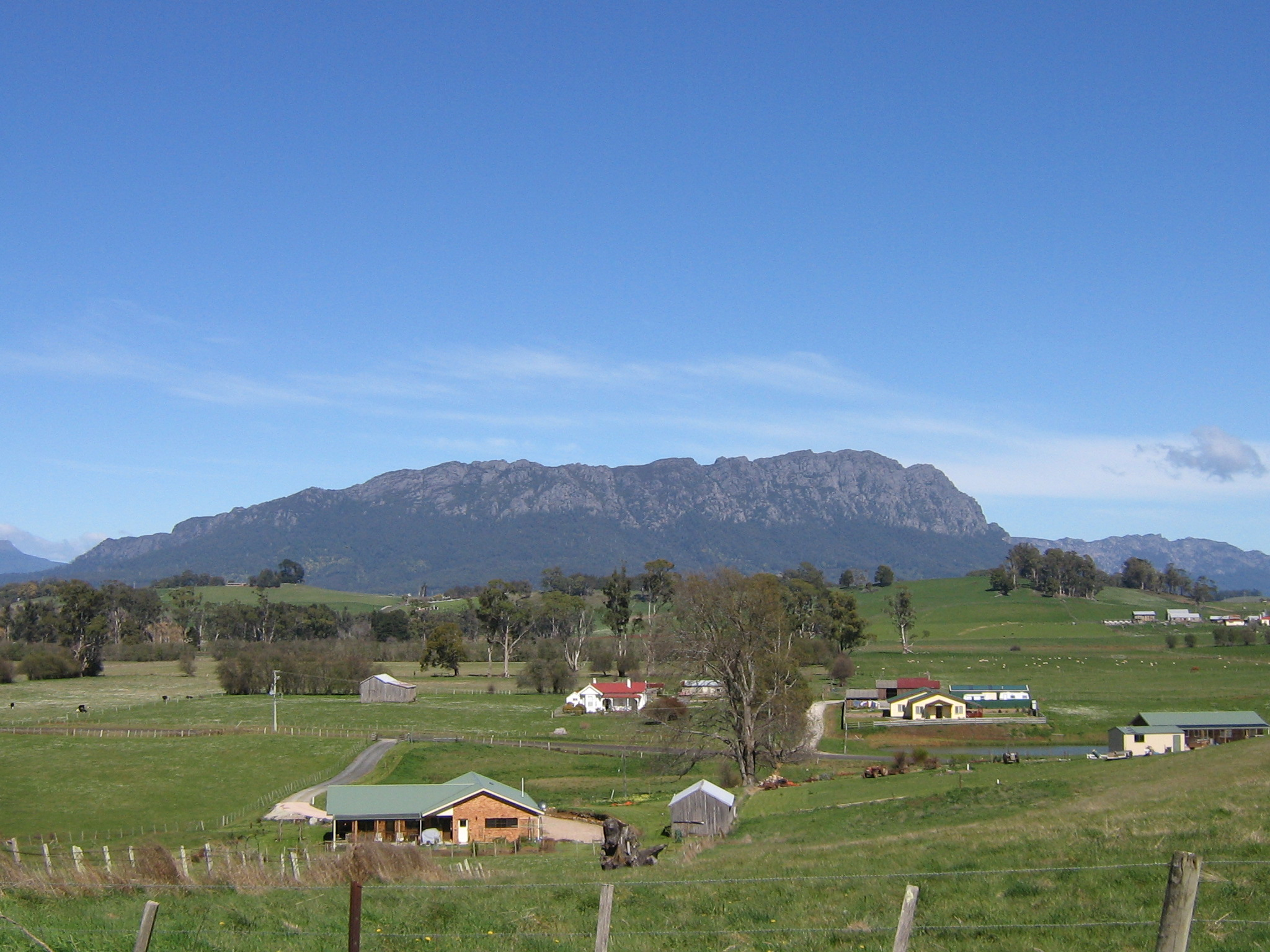
- Mount Roland from lookout at Sheffield

- Coordinates: 41°23′S 146°20′E
- Country: Australia
- State: Tasmania
- LGA: Kentish Council
- Location: 184 km (114 mi) NW of Hobart; 66 km (41 mi) W of Launceston; 23 km (14 mi) S of Devonport
- Established: 1859

Government
  - State electorate: Lyons
  - Federal division: Lyons
- Elevation: 280 m (920 ft)

Population
  - Total: 1,602 (2021 census)
- Mean max temp: 16.2 °C (61.2 °F)
- Mean min temp: 6.8 °C (44.2 °F)
- Annual rainfall: 1,061.3 mm (41.78 in)

Sheffield is a town 23 kilometres (14 mi) inland from Devonport, a city on the north-west coast of Tasmania. Sheffield has long been the rural hub for the Mount Roland area. The Sheffield area is well known for its high quality butterfat production via dairy farming. The district is also suitable for lamb and beef production. The town of Railton is nearby. At the 2021 census, Sheffield had a population of 1,602.

== History ==
Sheffield was one of the many early townships settled in 1859. The town was named by Edward Curr after his home town in South Yorkshire, England. Kentishbury Post Office opened on 1 November 1862 and was renamed Sheffield in 1882.

The area grew slowly, but the commencement of the Mersey-Forth Power Development Scheme in 1963 saw the town grow dramatically. The completion of the power scheme –- seven dams and seven power stations –- in 1973 saw the town's population decline.

=== Town of Murals ===
Sheffield's revival as the "Town of Murals" began as a bid by a small group of residents determined to save their town. Inspired by the story of Chemainus, a small Canadian town that had through mural art, rescued itself from ruin, the Kentish Association for Tourism (KAT) worked on the vision to combine the arts and tourism to revive and reinvent the town of Sheffield.

Sheffield has become a major tourist attraction due to it being promoted for its murals, based upon the instrumental contributions of the Kentish Association for Tourism (currently known as Sheffield Inc) and local tourism pioneer Brian Inder.

The first town mural was painted in Sheffield in December 1986. Since then over 60 murals depicting the area's rich history and beautiful natural scenery have been painted on walls throughout the town and buildings along the roadside. The murals attract an estimated 200,000 people to the town annually.

A number of studios are open to the public where visitors can watch the artists work. There are artists of many disciplines, including photography, fine art, glass, woodcraft, pottery, ceramics and specialised crafts.

The International Mural Fest art competition has been held annually since 2003 and returns in April each year. A poem is selected, which the artists use as their inspiration. After each competition the nine finalist murals remain on display at Mural Park until the next competition. In 2012, an interactive mural and workshops were added to the artistic activities of the festival for the Mural Fest 10th anniversary celebrations.

=== Tasmanian Medieval Festival ===
Sheffield hosts the annual two-day Tasmanian Medieval Festival every October. The festival includes sword fighting, fencing, archery, jousting and demonstrations of working cannons and trebuchets. The festival has grown in popularity since its inception, with 4000 people attending the event in 2018.

== Climate ==
Climate data for Sheffield School Farm (1997–2024); 277 m AMSL; 41.39° S, 146.32° E
Month	Jan	Feb	Mar	Apr	May	Jun	Jul	Aug	Sep	Oct	Nov	Dec	Year
Record high °C (°F)	37.1 (98.8)	31.9 (89.4)	31.0 (87.8)	27.3 (81.1)	20.0 (68.0)	18.1 (64.6)	16.4 (61.5)	17.7 (63.9)	21.7 (71.1)	24.3 (75.7)	28.7 (83.7)	32.3 (90.1)	37.1 (98.8)
Mean daily maximum °C (°F)	22.3 (72.1)	21.7 (71.1)	19.9 (67.8)	16.5 (61.7)	13.6 (56.5)	11.6 (52.9)	10.9 (51.6)	11.6 (52.9)	13.3 (55.9)	15.4 (59.7)	18.1 (64.6)	19.8 (67.6)	16.2 (61.2)
Mean daily minimum °C (°F)	10.9 (51.6)	10.7 (51.3)	9.5 (49.1)	7.1 (44.8)	5.3 (41.5)	3.8 (38.8)	3.3 (37.9)	3.8 (38.8)	4.7 (40.5)	5.8 (42.4)	7.6 (45.7)	9.0 (48.2)	6.8 (44.2)
Record low °C (°F)	2.3 (36.1)	3.1 (37.6)	0.9 (33.6)	−1.5 (29.3)	−2.0 (28.4)	−3.6 (25.5)	−3.9 (25.0)	−2.5 (27.5)	−2.1 (28.2)	−1.1 (30.0)	−0.2 (31.6)	1.2 (34.2)	−3.9 (25.0)
Average precipitation mm (inches)	56.8 (2.24)	40.4 (1.59)	70.8 (2.79)	68.3 (2.69)	91.7 (3.61)	116.2 (4.57)	135.2 (5.32)	131.0 (5.16)	112.1 (4.41)	90.2 (3.55)	78.3 (3.08)	63.6 (2.50)	1,055.1 (41.54)
Average precipitation days (≥ 0.2 mm)	8.9	8.3	10.0	11.5	15.7	16.5	19.0	19.0	16.8	13.3	11.4	10.4	160.8
Average afternoon relative humidity (%)	53	55	55	62	69	73	74	71	69	63	61	57	63
Source: Australian Bureau of Meteorology; Sheffield School Farm

== Natural attractions ==
There are many natural attractions in the Sheffield area.

=== Mount Roland ===
Mount Roland is the backdrop of the Sheffield township rising 1234 metres above sea level.

Mount Roland Conservation Area and Regional Reserve The reserve consists of 7600 hectares surrounding the range. A number of well marked bushwalks provide a day's exercise. There are walking tracks from Claude Road and Gowrie Park to the summit. The walk includes the plains and plateau leading to the peak. There are two tracks to the summit, which provide 360-degree views to Bass Strait, Cradle Mountain and Barn Bluff.

=== Lake Barrington ===
Lake Barrington is known as an international standard rowing venue and the site of the 1990 World Rowing Championships. It was created in 1969 by building the Devils Gate Dam on the Forth River.

The lake is a popular water ski location with access via West Kentish and Wilmot. There are two water ski clubs based at Lake Barrington: Kentish Aquatic Club and Horsehead Water Ski Club.

The lake is also used for canoeing and trout fishing. There is an adventure playground and a two-hour rainforest walk. Facilities for visitors include picnic sites, boat ramps and toilets.

=== Devils Gate Dam ===
The Devils Gate Dam has an overhanging crest that allows flood water to freefall to the river bed, with up to 2000 tonnes of water falling per second during an extreme flood.

It is one of the thinnest concrete arch dams in the world. It was completed by the Hydro-Electric Commission in 1969 and is 84 metres high. The narrowness of the gorge and the computer-aided design of its double-curvature shape enabled engineers to minimise the volume of concrete and hence the cost of the dam. Flood waters falling freely from the crest strike concrete slabs carefully positioned on the abutments to prevent undermining of the dam by erosion.

=== Lake Cethana ===
The walk starts at the junction just before turning into the Lemonthyme Lodge. The walk takes about two hours and allows visitors to observe the varieties of vegetation of the area. After crossing two areas of cleared land the track crosses a fern gully, beyond which there is more forest until the track terminates in the backwater of the lake. This walk is graded as hard because the return trip is a long haul uphill.

=== Kimberley Warm Springs ===
Kimberley Warm Springs are a geothermal feature and semi-developed visitor site located in the town of Kimberley. The micro climate created by the warm springs creates a unique habitat.

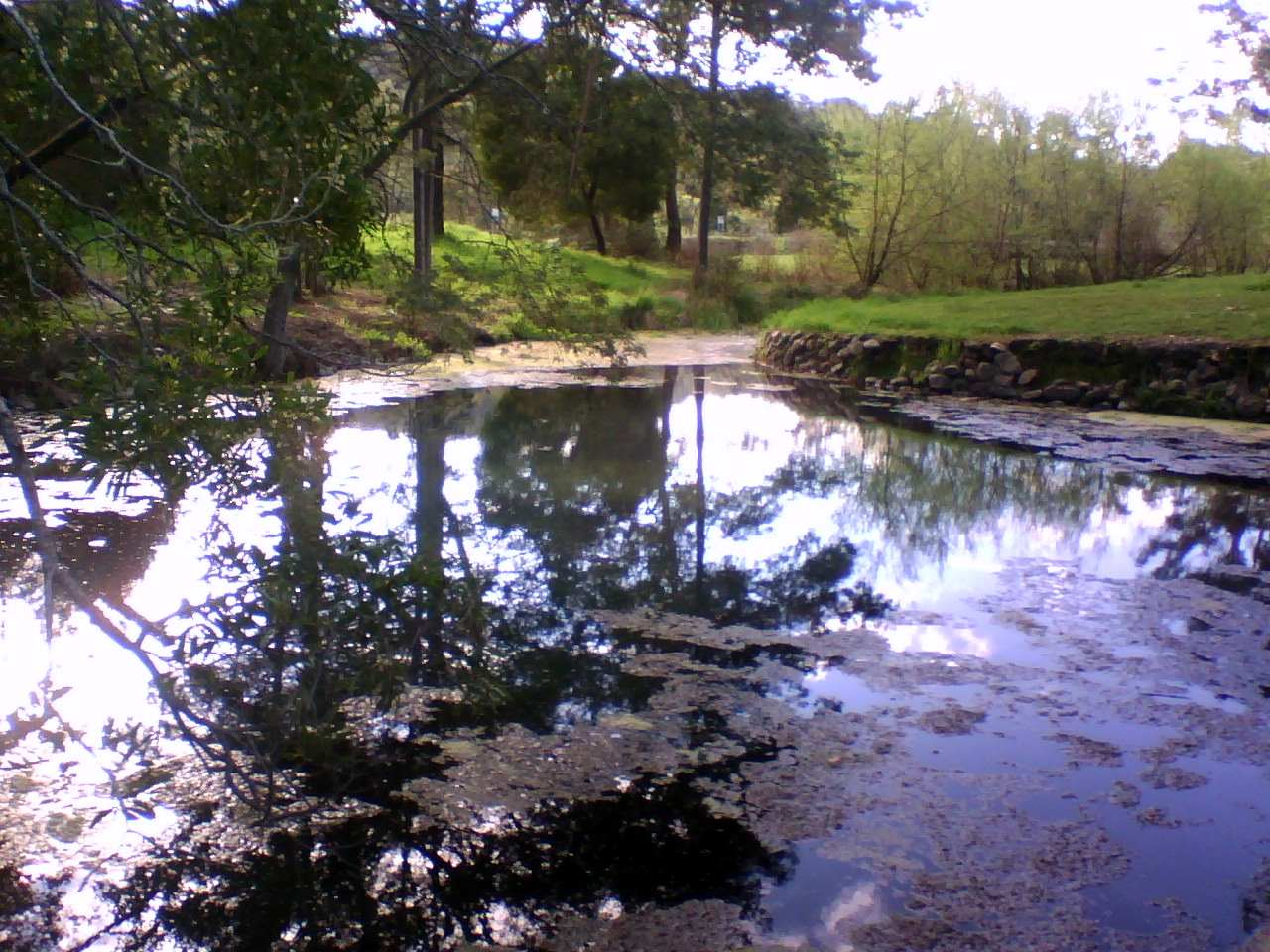
Kimberley Warm Springs

=== Gowrie Park ===
The small town of Gowrie Park is located 16 kilometres south of Sheffield. It is a starting point for walkers climbing Mount Roland. The town has a history as a Hydro construction village.

=== Cradle Mountain ===
Cradle Mountain is approximately one hour's drive south-west of the township. The mountain is accessible from the northern end of the Cradle Mountain-Lake St Clair National Park. There are numerous walks available, ranging from short to multi-day.

== Hydro control centre ==
All of the West Coast, Mersey Forth, Derwent and other Hydro Hydro Tasmania power stations are remotely controlled from the Hydro control centre in Hobart.

== Awards ==
Sheffield won the Australian Tidy Town Award in 2014.
