= Melbourne Airport (disambiguation) =

Melbourne Airport may refer to:

== Australia ==
- Melbourne Airport or Tullamarine Airport, also listed by some airlines as Melbourne Tullamarine, the major international airport in Melbourne, Victoria, Australia (IATA: MEL)
- Melbourne Airport (suburb), the suburb in which the Australian airport is located
- Avalon Airport, branded as Melbourne Avalon Airport, a secondary domestic airport near Melbourne, Victoria, Australia (IATA: AVV)

== Canada ==
- Melbourne Aerodrome, a private airport in Melbourne, Ontario, Canada

== United States ==
- Melbourne Orlando International Airport, in Melbourne, Florida, United States (FAA: MLB)
- Melbourne Municipal Airport, a former name of the Melbourne Orlando International Airport
- Melbourne Municipal Airport, in Melbourne, Arkansas, United States (FAA: 42A)
