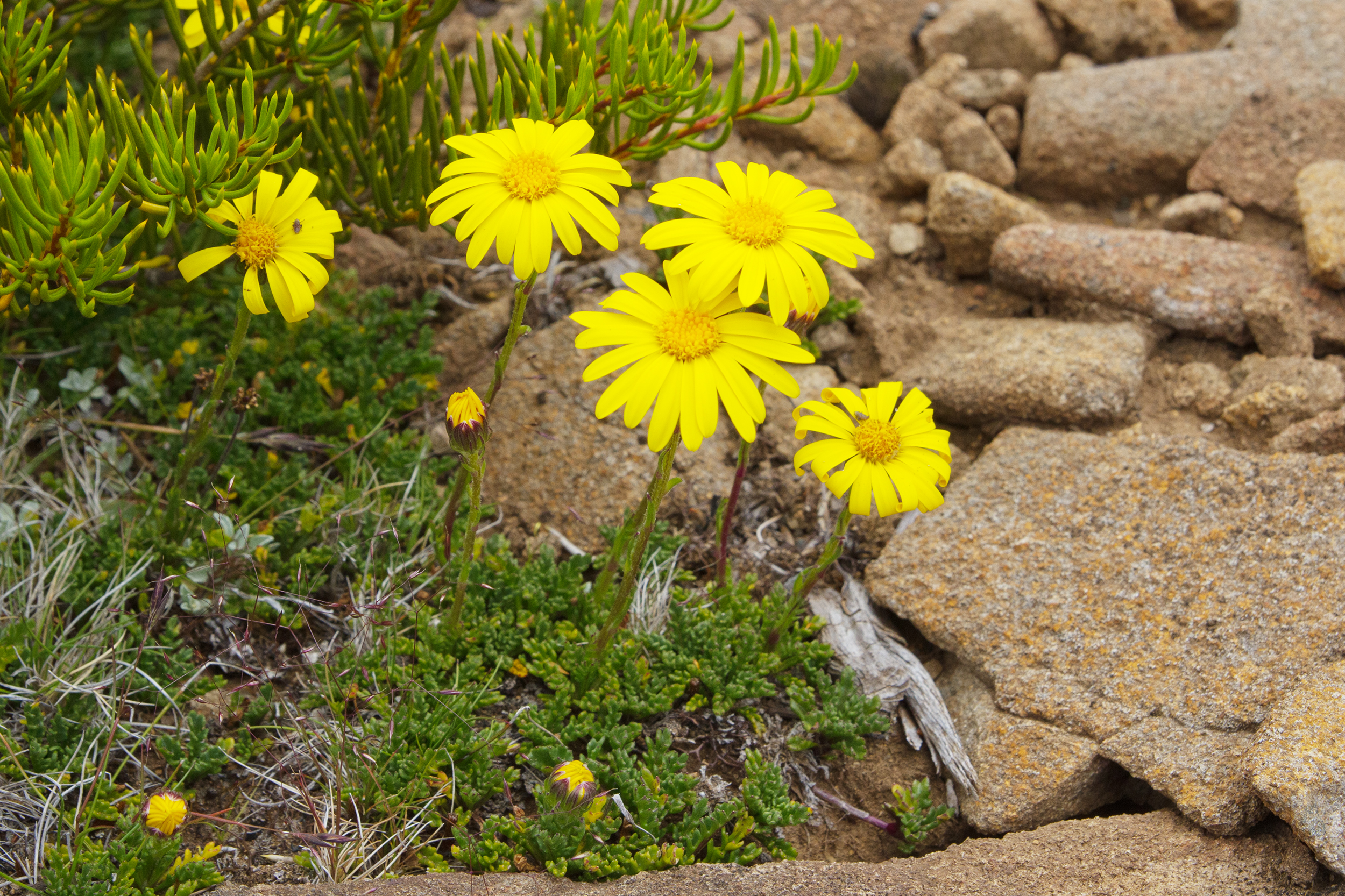
- In Walls of Jerusalem National Park, Tasmania

Scientific classification
- Kingdom: Plantae
- Clade: Tracheophytes
- Clade: Angiosperms
- Clade: Eudicots
- Clade: Asterids
- Order: Asterales
- Family: Asteraceae
- Genus: Scapisenecio
- Species: S. pectinatus

Binomial name
- Scapisenecio pectinatus (DC.) Schmidt-Leb.

Synonyms
- Senecio pectinatus DC.

= Scapisenecio pectinatus =

Species of flowering plant

Scapisenecio pectinatus, synonym Senecio pectinatus, commonly known as alpine groundsel, is a species of flowering plant in the aster family. The species occurs in alpine areas of south-eastern Australia in peat-based soils. It has divided leaves forming a basal rosette and produces a single yellow flower head (up to 30 mm diameter) on a stalk up to 20 cm high.

== Taxonomy ==
The species was first described by Augustin Pyramus de Candolle in 1838 as Senecio pectinatus. It was transferred to the new genus Scapisenecio in 2020 as a result of a molecular phylogenetic study of Australian species in the tribe Senecioneae.

Two varieties are currently recognised:

- Scapisenecio pectinatus var. major (F.Muell. ex Belcher) Schmidt-Leb. (Victoria and New South Wales)
- Scapisenecio pectinatus var. pectinatus (Victoria and Tasmania) It has small leaves with the tips of the divided segments curving inwards.

A white-flowering variety, formerly Senecio pectinatus var. ochroleucus F.Muell., was promoted to species status in 2004 as Senecio albogilvus I.Thomps., and then transferred to Scapisenecio as Scapisenecio albogilvus.
