= Parangana Dam =

Dam and power station in Tasmania, Australia

- Location of the dam in Tasmania
- Interactive map of Parangana Dam
- Country: Australia
- Location: Northern Tasmania
- Coordinates: 41°37′59″S 146°13′22″E
- Purpose: Power
- Status: Operational
- Opening date: 1968
- Owner: Hydro Tasmania

Dam and spillways
- Type of dam: Rock-fill dam
- Impounds: Mersey River
- Height: 53 m (174 ft)
- Length: 189 m (620 ft)
- Dam volume: 382×10^{3} m^{3} (13.5×10^{6} cu ft)
- Spillways: 1
- Spillway type: Uncontrolled
- Spillway capacity: 2,093 m^{3}/s (73,900 cu ft/s)

Reservoir
- Creates: Lake Parangana
- Total capacity: 14,820 ML (12,010 acre⋅ft)
- Catchment area: 715 km^{2} (276 sq mi)
- Surface area: 11.4 ha (28 acres)
- Normal elevation: 379 m (1,243 ft) AHD

Parangana Power Station
- Coordinates: 41°37′46″S 146°13′13″E
- Operator: Hydro Tasmania
- Commission date: 2002
- Type: Run-of-the-river mini-hydro
- Hydraulic head: 35 m (115 ft)
- Turbines: 1 x 0.75 MW (1,010 hp) (Tyco Tamar Francis-type)
- Installed capacity: 0.75 MW (1,010 hp)
- Capacity factor: 0.81
- Website hydro.com.au

The Parangana Dam is an earthen-faced rockfill embankment dam across the Mersey River, located south of Mersey Forest, in the northern region of Tasmania, Australia. Completed in 1968, the resultant reservoir, Lake Parangana, was established for the purpose of generating hydro-electric power via the Parangana Power Station, a run-of-the-river mini-hydro power station.

The dam, its reservoir, and the power station are owned and operated by Hydro Tasmania.

== Dam and reservoir overview ==
The rock-filled dam wall with a clay core is 53 metres (174 ft) high and 189 metres (620 ft) long. When full, Lake Parangana has capacity of 14,820 megalitres (12,010 acre⋅ft) and covers 11.4 hectares (28 acres), drawn from a catchment area of 715 square kilometres (276 sq mi). The single uncontrolled spillway is capable of discharging 2,093 cubic metres per second (73,900 cu ft/s).

Water is fed into Lake Parangana after running through the Rowallan and Fisher power stations. After running through the Parangana mini-hydro power station, water travels approximately eight-kilometre (5.0 mi) tunnels to the Lemonthyme Power Station which discharges into the River Forth. However, for environmental reasons, some water continues down the Mersey River. The station was built to generate energy from this environmental flow. As a result, the Mersey-Forth power development diverts the majority of water from the upper reaches of the Mersey from Lake Parangana to the River Forth.

On 2 March 2026, it was announced that the Sassafras Wesley Vale Irrigation Scheme Augmentation project officially commenced. The project will enable water to flow from the Mersey River, backed up by the Parangana Dam, to ensure farmers have water even in dry times. The project will add approximately 9.2 billion megalitres (7.5×10^{9} acre⋅ft) of water to the scheme, and is expected to be completed by mid-to-late 2027, including the installation of more than 100 kilometres (62 mi) of new and upgraded pipes; two pump stations (new and refurbished); a balance tank; and seventy water outlets for farms.

== Hydroelectric power station ==
The power station was commissioned in 2002 by Hydro Tasmania and is the only mini hydro electric power station in the Mersey–Forth run-of-river scheme that also contains seven run-of-the-river hydroelectric power stations. The Parangana Power Station has one Tyco Tamar Francis-type turbine, with a generating capacity of 0.85 megawatts (1,140 hp).

== See also ==
- List of power stations in Tasmania
- List of reservoirs and dams in Australia § Tasmania
- List of lakes of Australia § Tasmania
- List of run-of-the-river hydroelectric power stations
