= Mersey River (Tasmania) =

River in Tasmania, Australia

Mersey
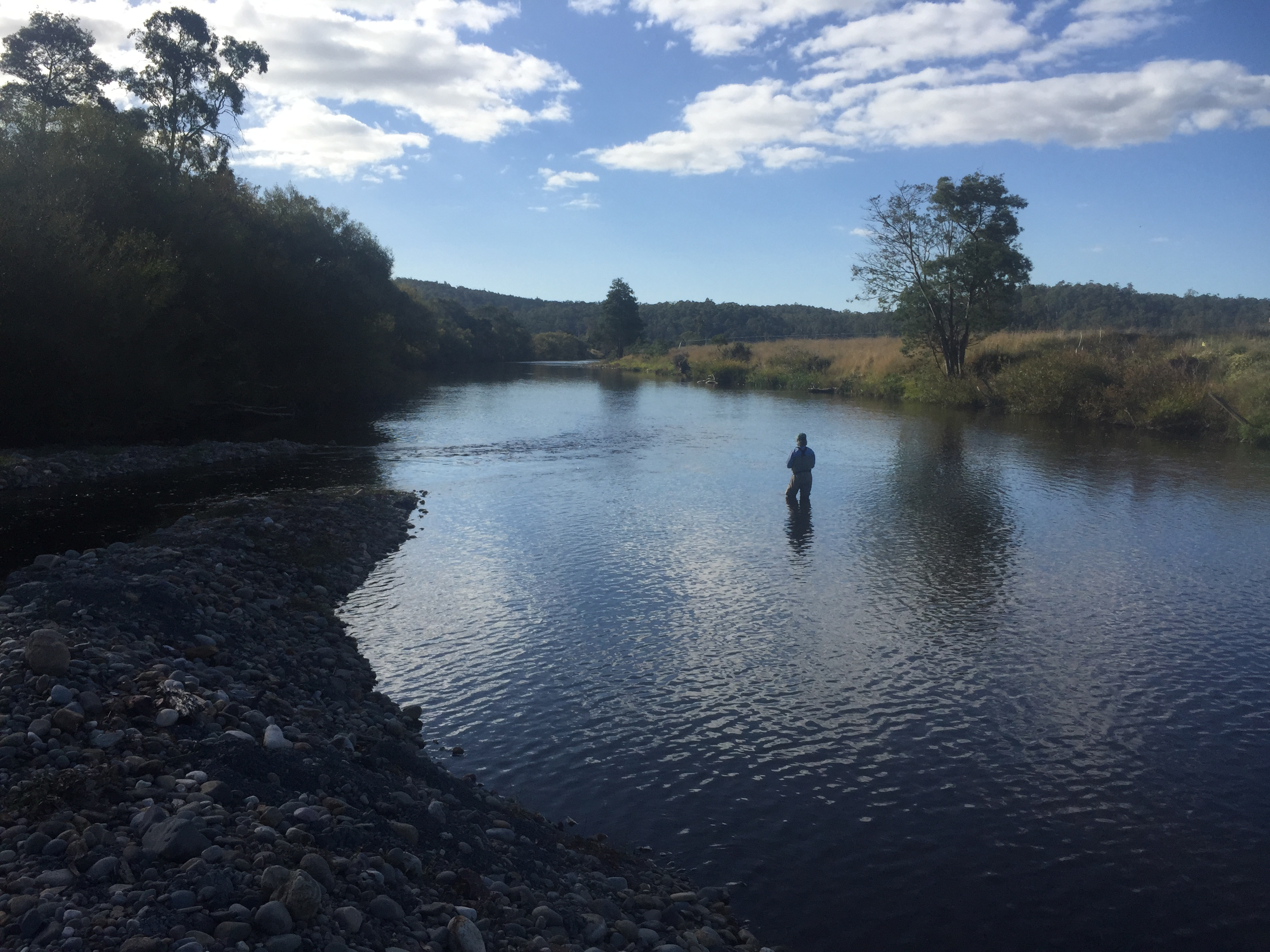
- Mersey River near Latrobe

- Location within Tasmania
- Etymology: River Mersey (England)

Location
- Country: Australia
- State: Tasmania

Physical characteristics
- Source: Lake Meston
  - location: Walls of Jerusalem National Park
  - coordinates: 41°53′56″S 146°13′40″E
  - elevation: 1,022 m (3,353 ft) AHD
- Mouth: Bass Strait
  - location: Devonport
- Length: 147 km (91 mi)

Basin features
- Bridges: Victoria Bridge, Devonport
- Inland ports: Port of Devonport
- Dams: Rowallan; Parangana

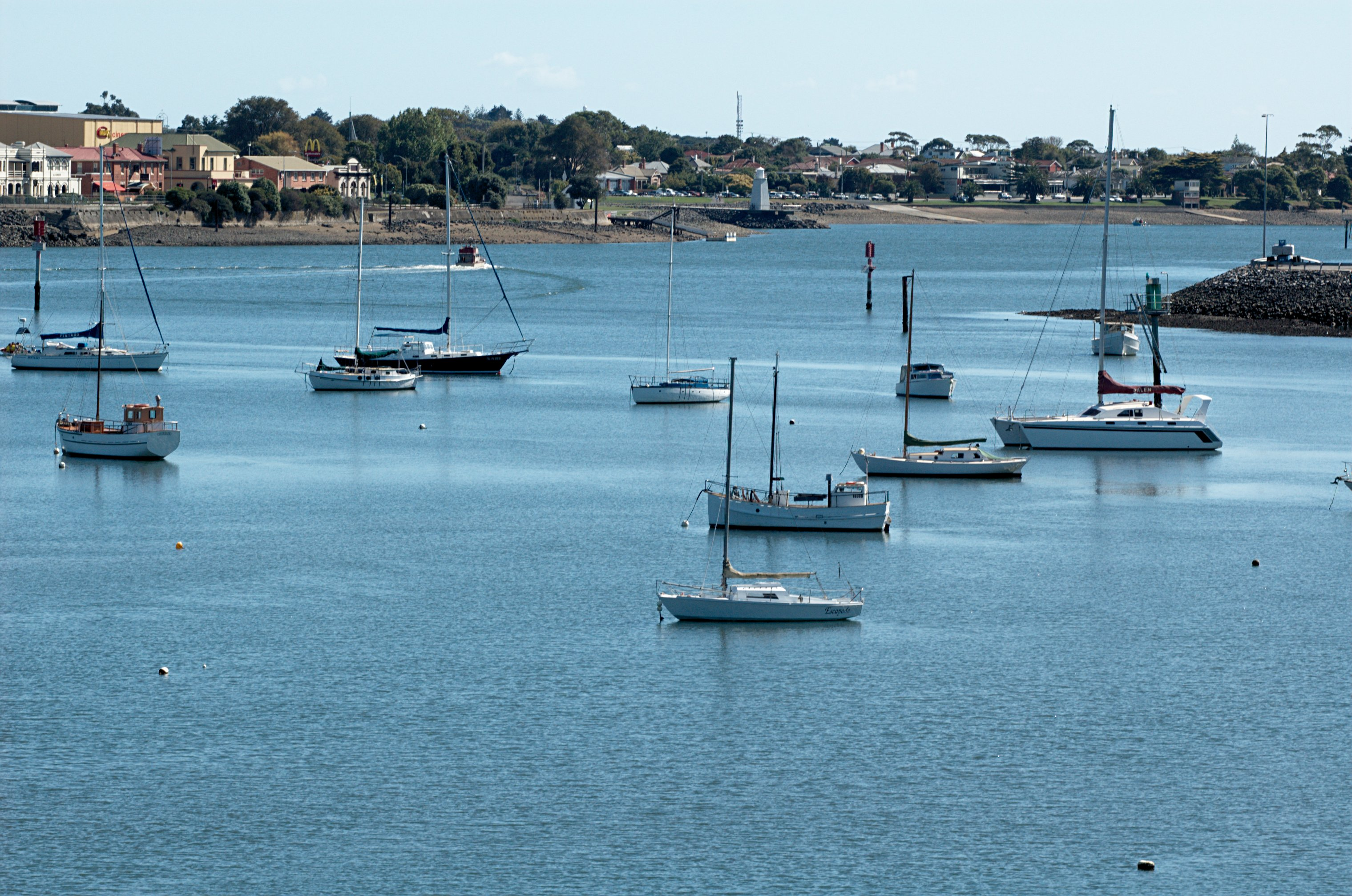
The estuary of the Mersey River at Devonport.

The Mersey River is a river on the north-west coast of Tasmania, Australia. The city of Devonport is situated at the river's mouth on Bass Strait.

== Geography ==
The Mersey River originates in Lake Meston, located within the Walls of Jerusalem National Park in Tasmania's Central Highlands. The river descends through a series of alpine lakes and man-made reservoirs, including Lake Youd, Lake Rowallan, and Lake Parangana, before reaching the Bass Strait at Devonport. The river’s course is characterised by its passage through glaciated landscapes, including U-shaped valleys and moraines formed during the Pleistocene epoch.

Key tributaries of the Mersey River include Lees Creek, Feather Creek, Campfire Creek, Overflow Creek, and Mole Creek. The river's flow is also supplemented by water from the Fisher River and its tributaries. Several smaller creeks, such as Lobster Rivulet and the Dasher River, join the Mersey downstream.

== Damming for hydroelectricity ==
The Mersey River is a vital component of Tasmania's hydroelectric power system. The Mersey is impounded by the Rowallan Dam to form Lake Rowallan and by the Parangana Dam to form Lake Parangana, both used as sources to generate hydroelectric power at the Rowallan and Parangana power stations. Water is also diverted westward to the Lemonthyme Power Station on the Forth River. A portion of the river's flow continues downstream to support environmental and recreational needs.

== History ==
The Mersey River was significant to the Panninher people, who relied on its resources for sustenance and cultural practices. Following European settlement in the early 19th century, the river became a hub for timber milling and agriculture. Later, mining activities in the surrounding areas further contributed to the region’s economic development.

The river gained attention in 2016 when severe flooding caused significant damage to infrastructure, including bridges and riverbanks, and created logjams in narrow sections. These events highlighted the challenges of managing extreme weather impacts on the Mersey River system.

On 2 March 2026, it was announced that the Sassafras Wesley Vale Irrigation Scheme Augmentation project officially commenced. The project will enable water to flow from the Mersey River, backed up by the Parangana Dam, to ensure farmers have water even in dry times. The project will add approximately 9.2 billion megalitres (7.5×10^{9} acre⋅ft) of water to the scheme, and is expected to be completed by mid-to-late 2027, including the installation of more than 100 kilometres (62 mi) of new and upgraded pipes; two pump stations (new and refurbished); a balance tank; and seventy water outlets for farms.

== Ecology ==
The Mersey River supports diverse ecosystems, including habitats for platypuses, trout, and native fish species. It is also home to the Tasmanian giant freshwater crayfish (Astacopsis gouldi), the world's largest freshwater invertebrate, which inhabits the river and its tributaries. Conservation efforts aim to protect this vulnerable species from habitat disturbance and illegal fishing.

The river's health is monitored by the Environment Protection Authority, which assesses water quality and ecosystem conditions. Reports focus on protecting aquatic ecosystems and managing environmental challenges, such as agricultural runoff and invasive species.

Annual reports from the Department of Natural Resources and Environment provide data on streamflow, water allocation, and river health, contributing to sustainable management of the Mersey River.

The upper reaches of the Mersey, within the Walls of Jerusalem National Park, are home to unique alpine flora and fauna. Conservation initiatives aim to preserve these environments while balancing the needs of tourism and hydroelectric development.

== Recreation ==
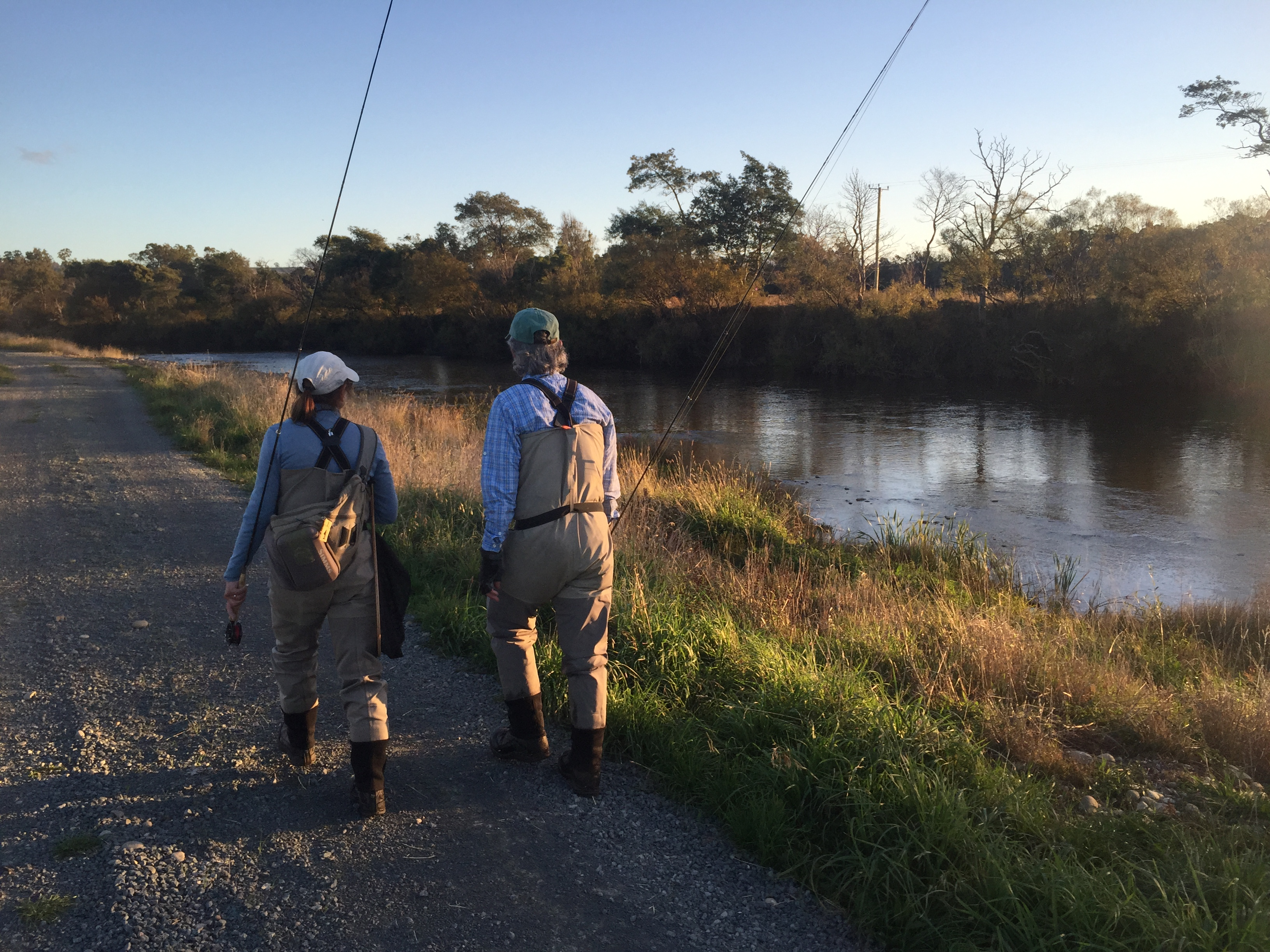
Anglers along the Mersey

The Mersey River is renowned for trout fishing, offering opportunities to catch brown and rainbow trout.

Recreational activities along the river include whitewater rafting, kayaking, and water skiing. The river hosts events such as the annual Devonport Regatta, which features boat racing, swimming, and woodchopping competitions. The Henley-on-Mersey festival in Latrobe celebrates Australia Day with unique activities like ferret racing, cherry spitting, and gumboot throwing.

== See also ==
- List of rivers of Australia § Tasmania
