= Lake Meston (Tasmania) =

Lake in Tasmania, Australia

- Location in Tasmania
- Location: Central Northern Tasmania
- Coordinates: 41°53′56″S 146°13′40″E
- Type: Natural lake
- Primary outflows: Mersey River
- Basin countries: Australia
- Max. length: 3 km (1.9 mi)
- Max. width: 1 km (0.62 mi)
- Surface elevation: 1,022 m (3,353 ft)
- Frozen: During some winters

Lake Meston is a natural lake in the central northern region of Tasmania, Australia in the Walls of Jerusalem National Park, and is the source of the Mersey River.

== Early Inhabitants ==
In 1922, brothers Arthur and Percy Youd built a hut at Lake Meston establishing a large hunting territory for fur that covered a wide area to the north, east and south of the lake. Percy became ill and died in 1928, Arthur continued to hunt from Lake Meston for 60 years.

Arthur was trapped in his hut by snow at one stage. This story was relayed to Dick Read, another bushman who roamed the highlands, and was incorporated into the design of a new hut built by Dick and his friends at Lake Meston.

== Recent use ==
The hut is now used by bushwalkers and fishermen.

Rainbow trout were first introduced into these waterways by an airdrop into Lake Meston in the 1950s.
