= Melbourne Airport =

International airport serving Melbourne, Victoria, Australia

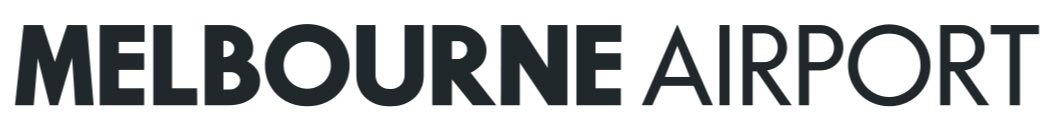

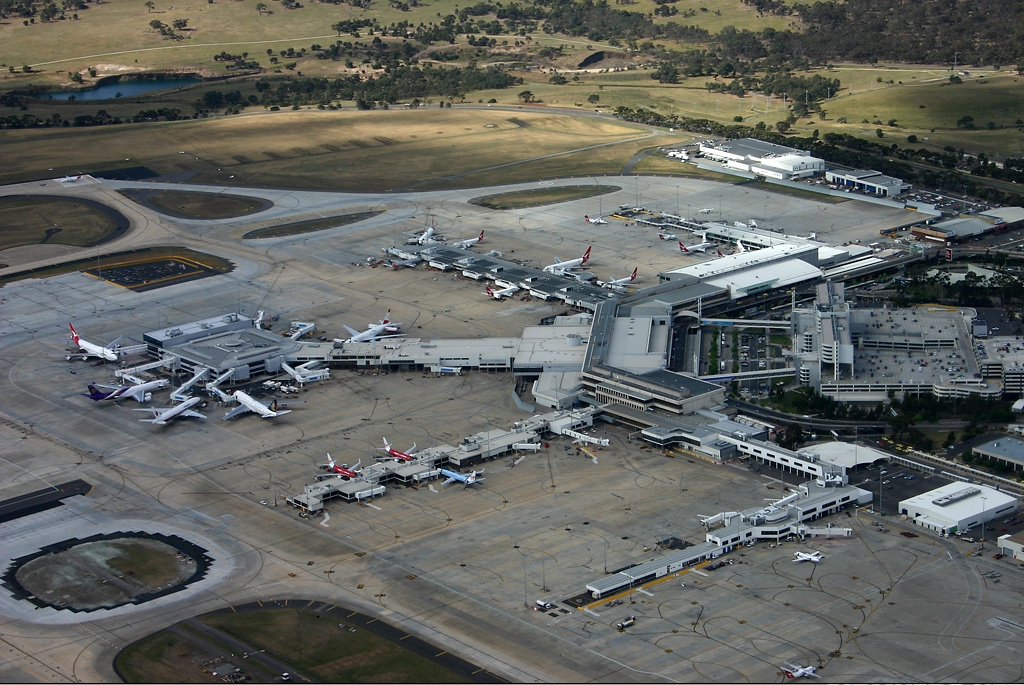
- Melbourne Airport, with all terminals visible
- IATA: MEL; ICAO: YMML; WMO: 94866

Summary
- Airport type: Public
- Owner/Operator: Australia Pacific Airports Corporation (APAC)
- Serves: Melbourne
- Location: Melbourne Airport, Victoria, Australia
- Opened: 1 July 1970; 56 years ago
- Hub for: Qantas; Virgin Australia
- Focus city for: ASL Airlines Australia
- Operating base for: Jetstar; Rex Airlines
- Time zone: AEST (UTC+10)
  - Summer (DST): AEDT (UTC+11)
- Elevation AMSL: 434 ft (132 m)
- Coordinates: 37°40′24″S 144°50′36″E
- Website: www.melbourneairport.com.au

Map
- Interactive map of Melbourne Airport

Runways
Direction	Length		Surface
Direction	m	ft	Surface
09/27	2,286	7,500	Asphalt
16/34	3,657	11,998	Asphalt
Planned	3,000	9,843	Asphalt

Statistics (2025)
- Passengers: 36,151,615
- Aircraft movements (2023): 217,041
- Economic impact (2025): $22 billion
- Social impact (2025): 239,000 (direct and indirect)
- Land area: 2,741 ha (6,770 acres)
- Sources: Australian AIP and aerodrome chart Passengers and aircraft movements from the Bureau of Infrastructure & Transport Research Economics

Melbourne Airport (IATA: MEL, ICAO: YMML), colloquially known as Tullamarine Airport, is an international airport serving Melbourne, Victoria, the second largest city in Australia. It is located in the suburb of Melbourne Airport, approximately 22 kilometres (14 mi) northwest of the Melbourne city centre.

The airport served over 36 million passengers in 2025, making it the second busiest airport in Australia by passenger movements after Sydney Airport. It opened in 1970 in the suburb of Tullamarine, replacing Essendon Airport for all international flights. It is also the main international gateway to the state of Victoria. The airport has a consolidated four-terminal layout with one international terminal, two standard domestic terminals and a terminal for low-cost domestic airlines, covering 1,070 hectares (2,600 acres) of airport property. It was specifically built to operate without a curfew and is Australia's busiest 24-hour airport.

It serves as a major hub for Qantas, Virgin Australia and Jetstar, and is also the headquarters of cargo airline Team Global Express.

== History ==
=== Background ===
Prior to the opening of Melbourne Airport, Victoria's main airport was Essendon Airport. Designated an international airport in 1950, Essendon experienced rapid growth in the post-war period. By the mid-1950s, rising passenger numbers exposed significant limitations: runways were too short for large jet aircraft, and terminal facilities were inadequate. An international overflow terminal was established in a new northern hangar, but further expansion was impossible as the airport had become surrounded by residential subdivisions.

=== Site selection ===
The search for a replacement for Essendon commenced in February 1958, when a panel was appointed to assess Melbourne's civil aviation needs. Alternative sites considered were Tullamarine (14.5 km from Melbourne), Whittlesea (35 km), Hastings (60 km), Port Melbourne (5 km), Werribee (32 km), Laverton (19 km), Avalon (58 km) and Moorabbin (19 km).

Considerations such as superior proximity to Melbourne and lower development costs narrowed the choice to either Tullamarine or Laverton, with Laverton eventually eliminated in part due to issues coordinating both military and civil activities that could not guarantee the degree of safety demanded, and that traffic coordination would be easier with the shorter distance between Essendon and Tullamarine.

=== Planning and development ===
In May 1959, it was officially announced that the Commonwealth Government had acquired 5,300 hectares of rural grassland in Tullamarine to build the new Melbourne Airport. Preliminary approval was granted in March 1960, and intense planning resulted over the following two years. In 1962, Prime Minister Robert Menzies formally adopted a five-year master plan which aimed to develop the airport by 1967. Construction began in November 1964.

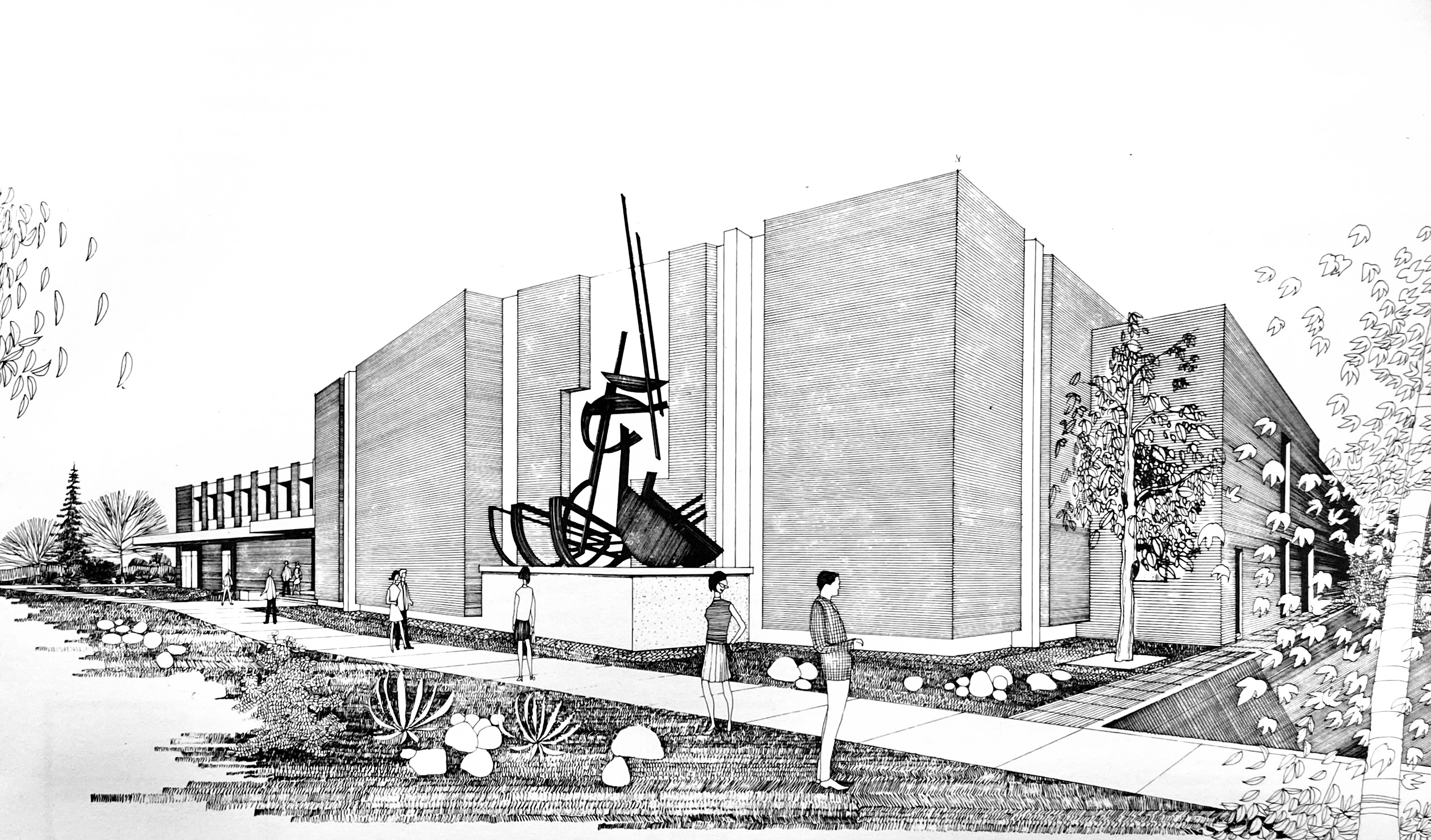
Architects' sketch of the Astrojet Centre

In 1966, it was announced that Paul Fayman, Leon Velik, Joseph Emanuel and Irvin Rockman had partnered with the Petersville Corporation to operate and manage the airport's several restaurants and bars. This included the prominent Top Air restaurant, which overlooked the airport and its operations. The following year, an affiliate company obtained the lease of a large vacant space adjacent to the future terminal building and released plans to build an aviation-themed entertainment complex.

Known as the Astrojet Space and Science Centre, it had a 300-seat cinema, an observation deck, shops, cafes and aviation exhibits with a guided-tour service. A Travelodge hotel with 240 beds and a service station were developed on adjoining land.

=== Official opening ===
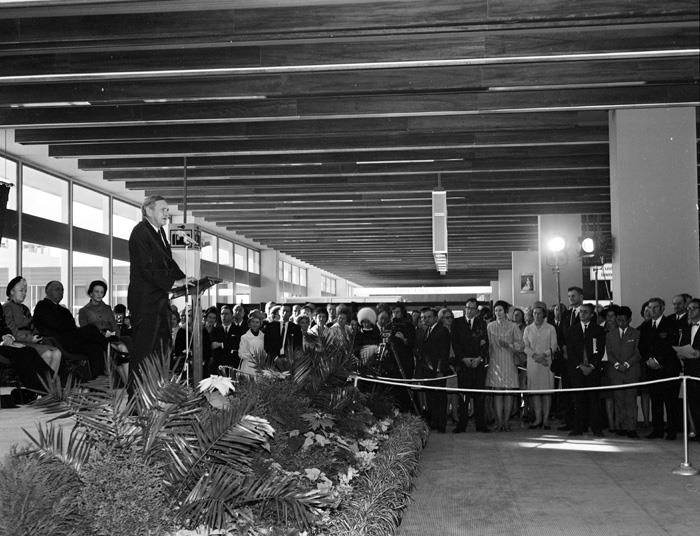
Prime Minister John Gorton giving a speech at the opening of Melbourne Airport in 1970

On 1 July 1970, Prime Minister John Gorton opened Melbourne Airport to international operations. This ended Essendon's nearly two-decade run as Melbourne's international airport. Essendon still was home to domestic flights for one year, until they transferred to Melbourne Airport on 26 June 1971, with the first arrival of a Boeing 747 occurring later that year. In the first year of operations, Melbourne handled six international airlines and 155,275 international passengers.

In order to distinguish it from Melbourne's other airports, Melbourne Airport is unofficially known as "Tullamarine Airport", or more informally as "Tullamarine" or "Tulla".

On opening, Melbourne Airport consisted of three connected terminals: International in the centre, with Ansett to the South and Trans Australia Airlines to the North. The design capacity of the airport was eight Boeing 707s at a rate of 500 passengers per hour, with minor expansion works completed in 1973 allowing Boeing 747s to serve the airport. By the late 1980s peak passenger flows at the airport had reached 900 per hour, causing major congestion.

In late 1989, Federal Airports Corporation Inspector A. Rohead was put in charge of a bicentennial project to rename streets in Melbourne Airport to honour the original inhabitants, European pioneers and aviation history. Information on the first two categories was provided by Ian Hunter, Wurundjeri researcher, and Ray Gibb, local historian. The project was completed but was shelved, with the only suggested name, Gowrie Park Drive, being allocated, named after the farm at the heart of the airport. During the 1920s, the farm had been used as a landing site for aircraft, which were parked at night during World War II in case Essendon Aerodrome was bombed.

=== Expansion and privatisation ===
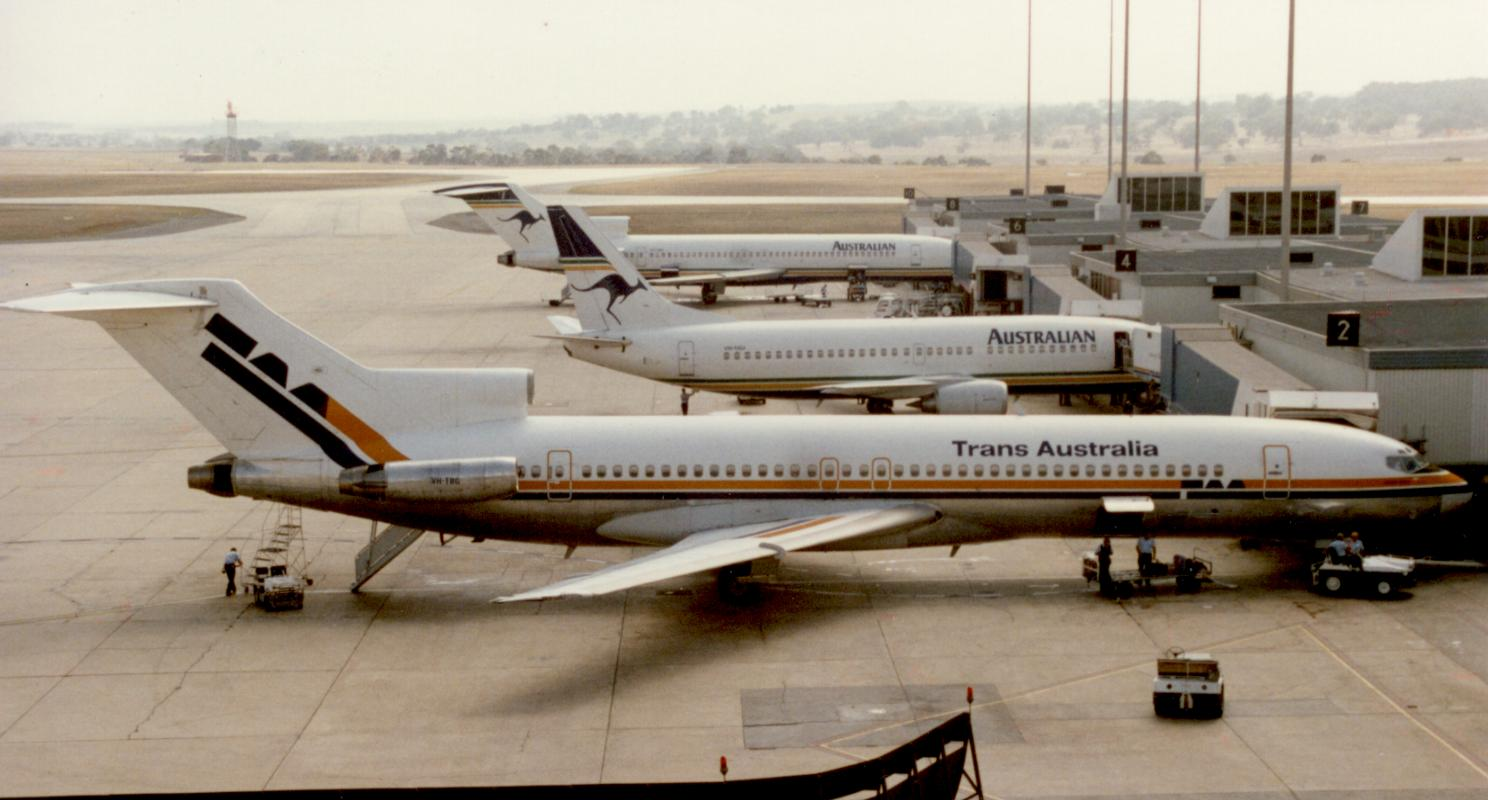
Australian Airlines Boeing 727 at Melbourne Airport in 1988

In 1988, the Australian Government formed the Federal Airports Corporation (FAC), placing Melbourne Airport under the operational control of the new corporation along with 21 other airports around the nation.

The FAC undertook a number of upgrades at the airport. The first major upgrades were carried out at the domestic terminals, with an expansion of the Ansett domestic terminal approved in 1989 and completed in 1991, adding a second pier for use by smaller regional airlines. Work on an upgrade of the international terminal commenced in 1991, with the "SkyPlaza" retail complex completed in late 1993 on a site flanking the main international departure gates. The rest of the work was completed in 1995, when the new three-level satellite concourse was opened at the end of the existing concourse. Diamond shaped and measuring 80 m (260 ft) on each side, the additional 10 aerobridges provided by the expansion doubled the international passenger handing capacity at Melbourne Airport.

In April 1994, the Australian Government announced that all airports operated by FAC would be privatised in several phases. Melbourne Airport was included in the first phase, being acquired by the newly formed Australia Pacific Airports Corporation for $1.3 billion. The transfer was completed on 30 June 1997 on a 50-year long-term lease, with the option for a further 49 years. Melbourne Airport is categorised as a Leased Commonwealth Airport.

Since privatization, further improvements to infrastructure have begun at the airport, including expansion of runways, car parks and terminals. The multi-storey carpark outside the terminal was completed between 1995 and August 1997 at a cost of $49 million, providing 3,100 parking spaces, the majority undercover. This initially four-level structure replaced the previous open air carpark outside the terminal. Work commenced on the six-story 276-room Hilton Hotel (now Parkroyal) above the carpark in January 1999, which was completed in mid-2000 at a cost of $55 million. Expansion of the Qantas domestic terminal was completed in 1999, featuring a second pier and 9 additional aircraft stands.

In December 2000, a fourth passenger terminal opened: the Domestic Express Terminal, located to the south of the main terminal building at a cost of $9 million. It was the first passenger terminal facility to be built at Melbourne Airport since 1971.

Expansion of carparks has also continued with a $40 million project commenced in 2004, doubling the size of the short term carpark with the addition of 2,500 spaces over six levels, along with 1,200 new spaces added to the 5,000 already available in the long term carpark. Revenue from retail operations at Melbourne Airport broke the $100 million mark for the first time in 2004, this being a 100 per cent increase in revenue since the first year of privatization.

In 2005, the airport undertook construction works to prepare the airport for the arrival of the double-decker Airbus A380. The main work was the widening of the main north–south runway by 15 m (49 ft), which was completed over a 29-day period in May 2005. The improvements also included the construction of dual airbridges (Gates 9 and 11) with the ability to board both decks simultaneously to reduce turnaround times, the extension of the international terminal building by 20 m (66 ft) to include new penthouse airline lounges, and the construction of an additional baggage carousel in the arrivals hall. As a result, the airport was the first in Australia to be capable of handling the A380. The A380 made its first test flight into the airport on 14 November 2005. On 15 May 2008, the A380 made its first passenger flight into the airport when a Singapore Airlines Sydney-bound flight was diverted from Sydney Airport because of fog. Beginning services in October 2008, Qantas was the first airline to operate the A380 from the airport, flying nonstop to Los Angeles International Airport twice a week. This was the inaugural route for the Qantas A380.

In March 2006, the airport undertook a 5,000 m^{2} (54,000 sq ft) expansion of Terminal 2, and the construction of an additional level of airline lounges above the terminal. In 2008 a further 25,000 m^{2} (270,000 sq ft) expansion of Terminal 2 commenced, costing $330 million with completion in 2011. The works added five aerobridges on a new passenger concourse, and a new 5,000 m^{2} (54,000 sq ft) outbound passenger security and customs processing zone.

In 2017, Melbourne Airport international passenger movements exceeded 10 million annual travellers. In the Financial Year of 2022/2023, international passenger movements exceeded 8 million travellers, up 330% post-COVID.

The airport set a new monthly record for international passengers in January 2026 with 1.261 million travellers passing through Terminal 2.

== Terminals ==
Melbourne Airport's terminals have 68 gates: 53 domestic and 15 international. There are five dedicated freighter parking positions on the Southern Freighter Apron. The current terminal numbering system was introduced in July 2005; they were previously known as Qantas Domestic, International, and South (formerly Ansett Domestic).

=== Terminal 1 ===
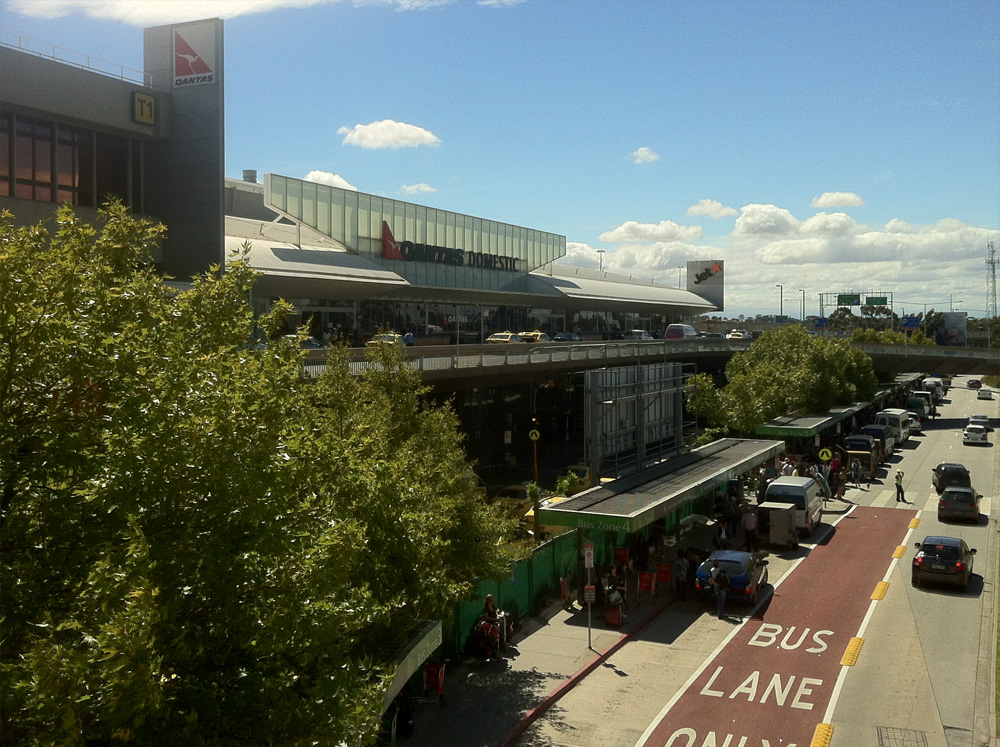
Terminal 1 hosts Qantas and QantasLink domestic flights

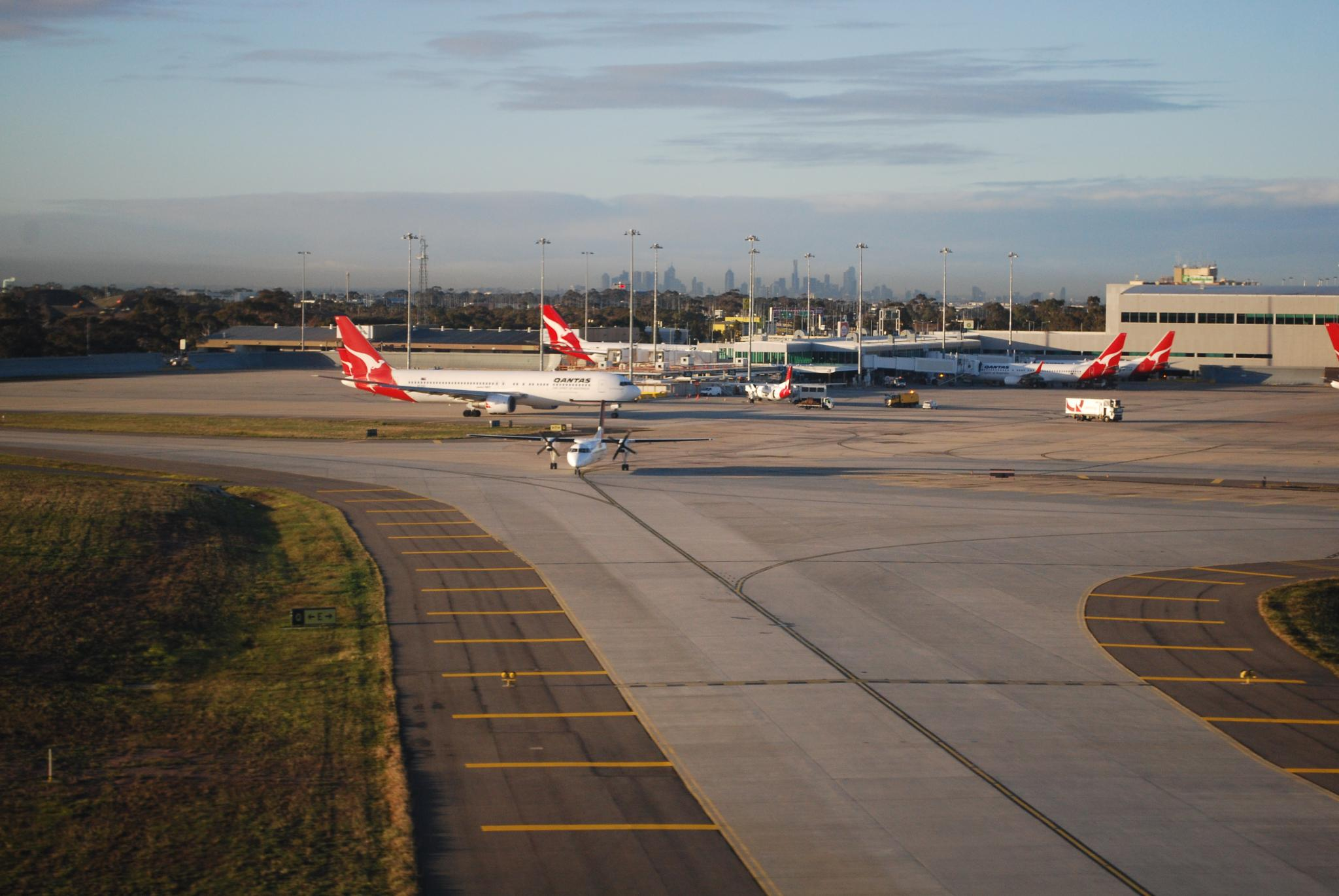
The second pier at Terminal 1 was built in 1999

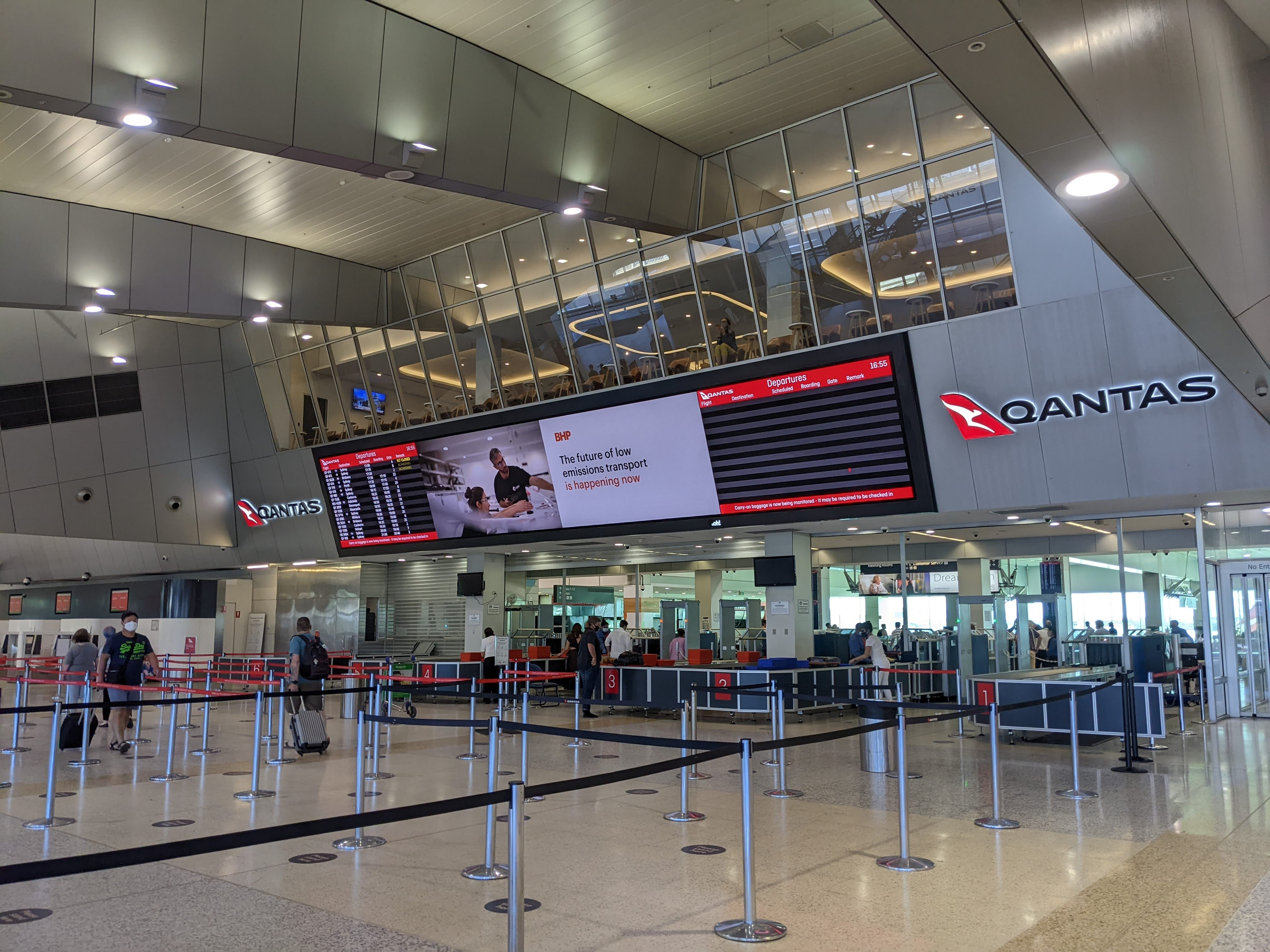
Terminal 1 departures

Terminal 1 hosts domestic and regional services for Qantas Group airlines, Qantas and QantasLink (which is located to the northern end of the building). Check-in, security, a food court and the entrance to the Qantas Lounge Precinct are located on the first floor, while baggage claim is located on the ground floor. The terminal has 16 parking bays served by aerobridges; 12 are served by single aerobridges whilst four are served by double aerobridges. There are another five non-aerobridge gates, which are used by QantasLink.

Opened with Melbourne Airport in 1970 for Trans Australia Airlines, the terminal passed to Qantas in 1992 when it acquired the airline. Work on improving the original terminal commenced in October 1997 and was completed in late 1999 at a cost of $50 million, featuring a second pier, stands for 9 additional aircraft, an extended access roadway and the expansion of the terminal.

Today, a wide range of shops and food outlets are situated at the end of the terminal near the entrance into Terminal 2. Qantas has a Qantas Club, Domestic Business Lounge and a Chairman's Lounge in the terminal.

=== Terminal 2 ===
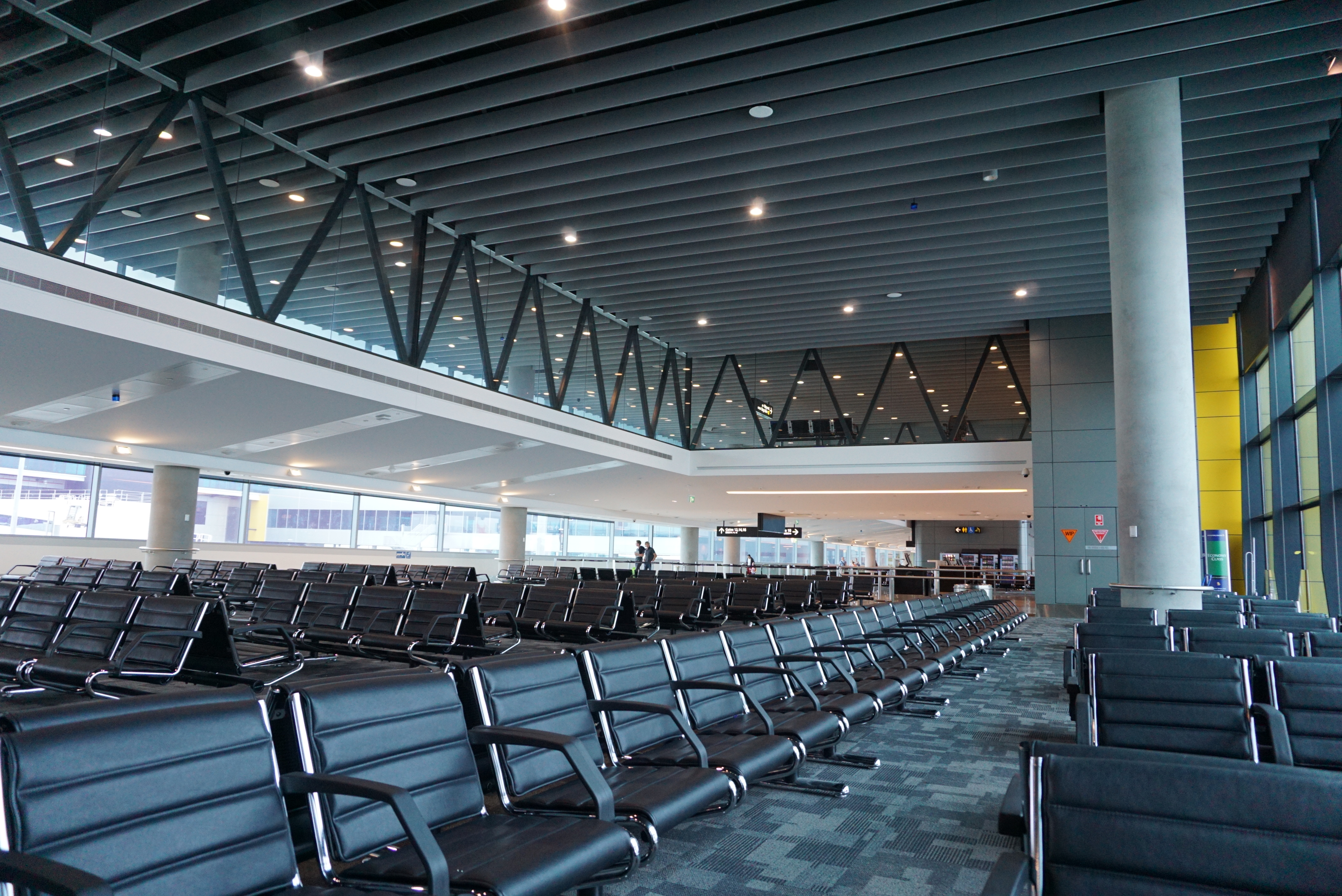
T2 departure gates

Terminal 2 handles all international, and limited domestic flights out of Melbourne Airport, and opened in 1970. The terminal has 20 gates with aerobridges. Cathay Pacific, Qantas (which includes two lounges in Terminal 2, a First lounge, and a Business lounge/Qantas Club), Singapore Airlines, Air New Zealand and Emirates all operate airline lounges in the terminal.

The international terminal contains works by noted Australian Indigenous artists including Daisy Jugadai Napaltjarri and Gloria Petyarre.

A $330 million expansion programme for Terminal 2 was announced in 2007 and completed in 2012. The objectives of this project included new lounges and retail facilities, a new satellite terminal, increased luggage capacity and a redesign of customs and security areas. A new satellite terminal was also constructed as part of the project, featuring floor-to-ceiling windows which offer views of the north–south runway. The new concourse also includes three double-decker aerobridges, each of which can accommodate an A380 or two smaller aircraft and one single aerobridge. The baggage handling capacity was also increased, and two new baggage carousels were built to cater to increased A380 traffic.

Although described as a satellite terminal, the terminal building is connected by an above-ground corridor to Terminal 2. Departures take place on the lower deck (similar to the A380 boarding lounges currently in use at Gates 9 and 11), with arrivals streamed on to the first floor to connect with the current first floor arrivals deck.

In early 2025, the airport stated that there were discussions on "an expanded international satellite terminal" to take pressure off Terminal 2 following a recovery to pre-pandemic levels. This is poised to include a $500m upgrade to the terminal's baggage handling system, as well as "more gates, more aircraft parking stands, more check-in space, and a larger baggage reclaim hall."

In February 2026, Melbourne Airport announced details of a planned $4.5 billion expansion of Terminal 2, with the program to be delivered in stages over several years. The project includes expanded international check-in and baggage reclaim halls, five new aircraft stands, additional waiting areas, lounge facilities, retail space and baggage carousels. Preliminary works on the first stage are expected to begin after the opening of the airport’s new road network and T123 Transport Hub in Spring 2026, which will allow the international terminal to expand into the existing forecourt.

=== Terminal 3 ===
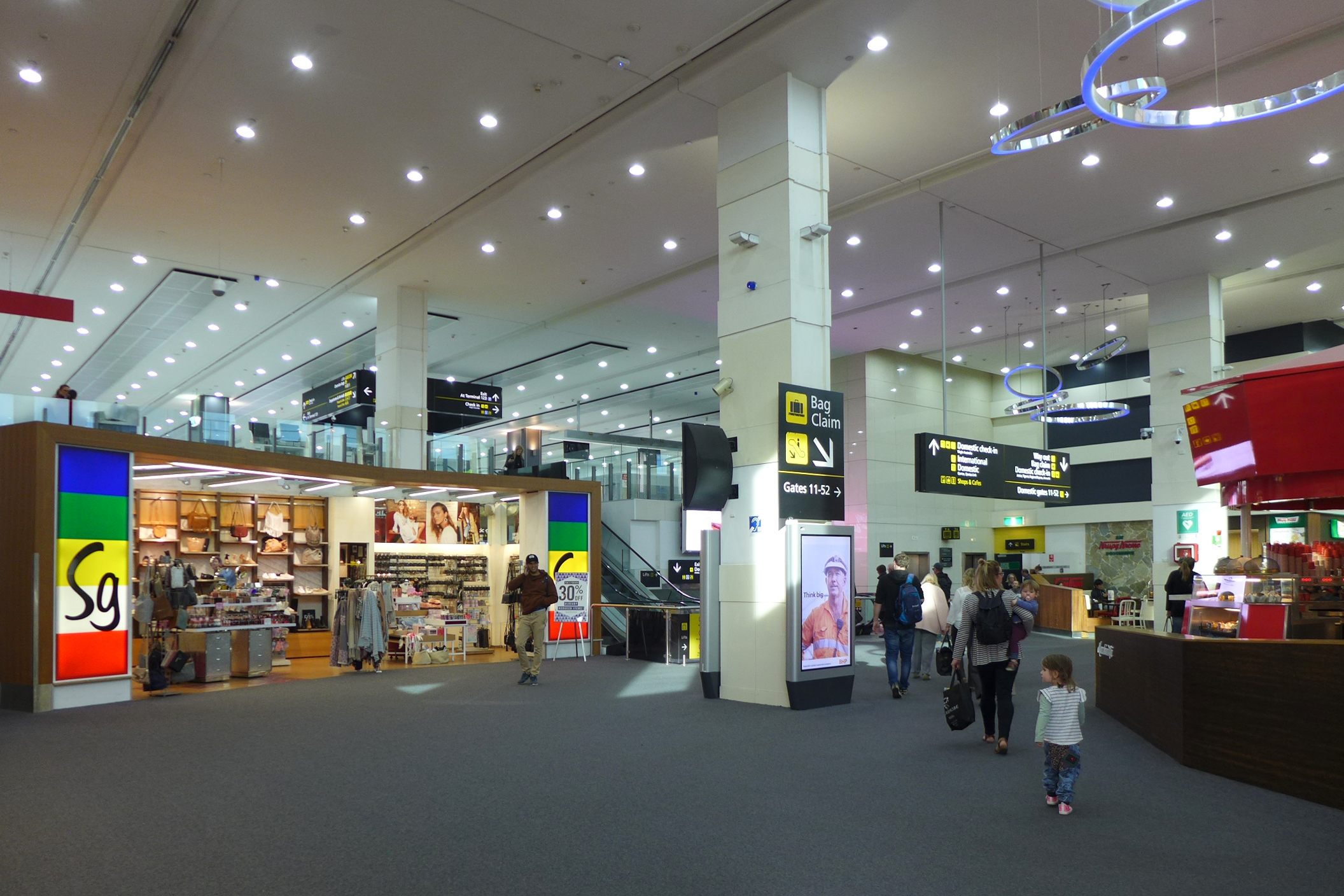
Terminal 3's former interior

Terminal 3 opened with the airport as the Ansett Australia terminal, but is now owned by Melbourne Airport. Terminal 3 is currently home to Virgin Australia. It has eleven parking bays served by single aerobridges and eight parking bays not equipped with aerobridges.

An expansion of the terminal was approved in 1989 and completed in 1991 when a second pier was added by Ansett to the south for use by smaller regional airline Kendell, which Ansett owned. The terminal was used exclusively by the Ansett Group for all its domestic activities until its collapse in 2001. It was intended to be used by the "new Ansett", under ownership of Tesna; however, following the Tesna group's withdrawal of the purchase of Ansett in 2002, the terminal was sold back to Melbourne Airport by Ansett's administrators. As a result, Melbourne Airport undertook a major renovation and facelift of the terminal, following which Virgin Australia (then Virgin Blue) moved in from what was then called Domestic Express (now Terminal 4), and has since begun operating The Lounge in the terminal, using the former Ansett Australia Golden Wing Lounge area. Rex also operates an airline lounge in the terminal.

=== Terminal 4 ===
Pier with gates 41–52, part of Terminal 4

Terminal 4 is dedicated to budget airlines and is the first facility of its kind at a conventional airport in Australia. It was originally constructed for Virgin Blue (Virgin Australia) and Impulse Airlines. Virgin Blue eventually moved into Terminal 3 following the demise of Ansett. A refit began in June 2007 along the lines of the budget terminal model at Singapore Changi Airport and Kuala Lumpur International Airport. The refit cost AU$5 million. Lower landing and airport handling fees are charged to airlines due to the basic facilities, lack of jet bridges, and fewer amenities and retail outlets compared to a conventional terminal. However, the terminal is located next to the main terminal building, unlike in Singapore and Kuala Lumpur. The terminal was rebuilt by Tiger Airways Australia, which had used it as its main hub since it operated its first domestic flight on 23 November 2007.

Jetstar confirmed its involvement in discussions with Melbourne Airport regarding the expansion of terminal facilities to accommodate for the growth of domestic low-cost services. The expansion of Terminal 4 includes infrastructure to accommodate Tigerair Australia and Jetstar flights. The development cost hundreds of millions of dollars. In March 2012, airport officials would break ground that October and they expected completion in July 2014, however, they pushed that date to late August 2015. The facility opened on 18 August 2015 with Jetstar first utilising the terminal. The new T4 terminal is 35,000 m^{2} (380,000 sq ft) and linked "under one roof" with T3. Terminal 4 is currently used by Rex Airlines, Jetstar, and Airnorth. Tigerair Australia and Bonza formerly also used Terminal 4 before going into administration.

The terminal has Rex Airlines and Jetstar check-ins, baggage claim and bag drop on ground floor whilst the food court, shops and lounges are located on the first floor, which lead to the departure/arrival zone.

Some Virgin Australia flights currently use the jet bridge equipped section of Terminal 4 for operations (formerly shared with the now-ceased REX Boeing 737 operations), while Jetstar uses the non-jet bridge equipped section of Terminal 4 for operations. Currently Airnorth does not operate any services to Melbourne, however still retains their check-in/baggage check-in desks.

=== Southern freighter apron ===
The southern freighter apron has five dedicated freighter parking positions which host 21 dedicated freighter operations a week. In August 1997, the fifth freighter parking position and the apron was extended.

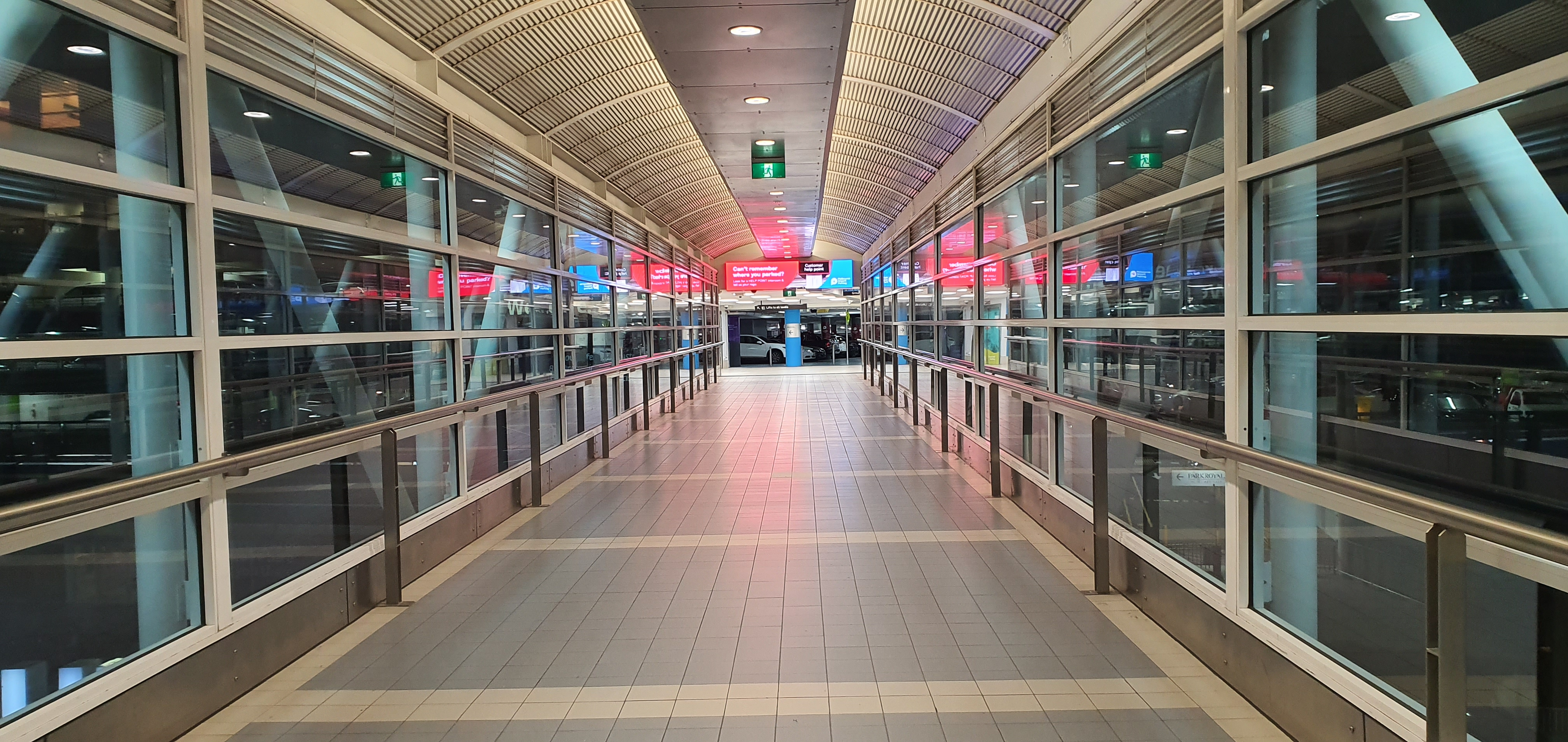
Walkway to car park

=== Other facilities ===
Melbourne Airport is served by six hotels. A Parkroyal Hotel is located 100 m (330 ft) from Terminal 2 atop the multi-level carpark. Work commenced on the six-story 280-room hotel in January 1999 and was completed in mid-2000. The hotel was originally a Hilton but was relaunched as the Parkroyal on 4 April 2011. A Holiday Inn is located 400 m (1,300 ft) from the terminal precinct. Ibis Budget offers budget rooms located 600 m (2,000 ft) from the terminals. Mantra Tullamarine opened in 2009, 2 km (1.2 mi) from the terminal precinct. A combined 4.5-star Novotel and 4-star Ibis Styles hotel located in The Hive precinct opened on 1 July 2024. The Novotel boasts 248 rooms, while the Ibis Styles offers 216 rooms. Both hotels are located a 5-minute walk from Terminals 3 and 4 and a 10-minute walk from Terminals 1 and 2. During late 2023, the Parkroyal underwent a major refurbishment of all guest rooms.

== Operations ==
Airport layout (as of May 2024)

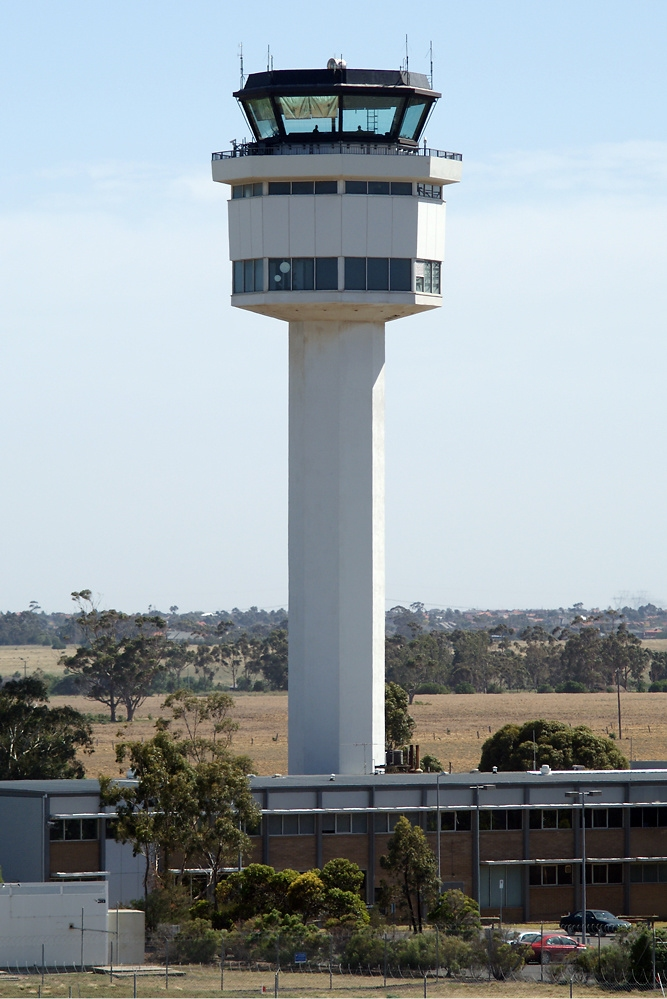
The original control tower, January 2009

=== Overview ===
Melbourne is the second busiest airport in Australia. The airport is curfew-free and operates 24 hours a day, although between 2 am and 4 am, freight aircraft are more prevalent than passenger flights. In 2004, the environmental management systems were accredited ISO 14001, the world's best practice standard, making it the first airport in Australia to receive such accreditation.

=== Runways ===
Melbourne Airport has two intersecting runways: one 3,657 m (11,998 ft) north–south and one 2,286 m (7,500 ft) east–west. Runway extensions are planned in the long-term, including an 843 m (2,766 ft) extension of the north–south runway to lengthen it to 4,500 m (14,764 ft), and a 1,214 m (3,983 ft) extension of the east–west runway to a total of 3,500 m (11,483 ft).

In 2008, Melbourne Airport announced the installation of a Category III landing system, allowing planes to land in low visibility, such as fog. This system, the first of its kind in Australia, was commissioned in March 2010 at a cost of $10 million.

==== Third runway ====
Due to increasing air traffic and limited capacity, proposals for third runway at Melbourne Airport have been under consideration since the 1990s, appearing in successive long-term master-plan documents. Two new runways have been proposed: a 3,000 m runway parallel to the current north–south runway and another 3,000 m runway south of the existing east–west runway.

In 2013, a new parallel east–west runway was proposed, with a then estimated cost of $500–750 million. If sent for approval, construction was expected to begin around 2018 and finish by 2023. However, following a consultation period in 2019, Melbourne Airport dropped these plans in favor of constructing a new parallel north–south runway to the west, citing concerns about aircraft noise in suburbs under the flight path including Gladstone Park, Westmeadows, Attwood, and Jacana, as well as wind direction considerations.

In September 2024, the Federal Government officially approved the construction of the third runway. The project will be wholly funded by the airport, costing $3 billion, and involve construction of a second parallel north–south runway. New taxiways will also be built and the existing east–west runway length will be retained. Construction will commence in 2025 with completion expected by 2031. The new runway is intended to increase capacity and support future growth as Melbourne's population continues to grow. However, the project has faced opposition from nearby residents, local councils and community groups, including the City of Brimbank, over concerns about noise in affected suburbs of Bulla, Keilor, Kealba, St Albans and Sunshine North as well as environmental impacts.

=== Control towers ===
The first control tower opened in 1969 with the construction of the airport, is 47 metres (154 ft) tall. Construction of a taller second control tower began in 2010. It is located just west of the original control tower and is 75 metres (246 ft) tall. It became operational in 2013 and was officially opened on 14 March 2014. The original tower, while no longer in use, was not demolished. Both control towers are located south of the east–west runway and west of the original north–south runway.

=== Melbourne Airspace Control Centre ===
In addition to the onsite control tower, the airport is home to Melbourne Centre, an air traffic control facility that is responsible for the separation of aircraft in Australia's busiest flight information region (FIR), Melbourne FIR. Melbourne FIR monitors airspace over Victoria, Tasmania, southern New South Wales, most of South Australia, the southern half of Western Australia and airspace over the Indian and Southern Ocean. In total, the centre controls 6% of the world's airspace. The airport is also the home of the Canberra, Adelaide and Melbourne approach facilities, which provide control services to aircraft arriving and departing at those airports.

== Airlines and destinations ==
=== Passenger ===
Airlines	Destinations
Air China	Beijing–Capital
Air India	Delhi–Indira Gandhi
Air New Zealand	Auckland, Christchurch, Queenstown, Wellington
AirAsia X	Kuala Lumpur–International
Batik Air Malaysia	Denpasar, Kuala Lumpur–International
Beijing Capital Airlines	Hangzhou, Qingdao
British Airways	Kuala Lumpur–International (begins 11 January 2027), London–Heathrow (resumes 11 January 2027)
Cathay Pacific	Hong Kong
Cebu Pacific	Manila
China Airlines	Taipei–Taoyuan
China Eastern Airlines	Nanjing, Shanghai–Pudong, Xi'an
China Southern Airlines	Guangzhou
Delta Air Lines	Los Angeles
Emirates	Dubai–International
Etihad Airways	Abu Dhabi
Fiji Airways	Nadi
Finnair	Bangkok–Suvarnabhumi, Helsinki
Garuda Indonesia	Denpasar, Jakarta–Soekarno-Hatta
Hainan Airlines	Haikou
Hong Kong Airlines	Hong Kong
Japan Airlines	Tokyo–Narita
Jetstar	Adelaide, Auckland, Ayers Rock, Ballina, Bangkok–Suvarnabhumi, Brisbane, Busselton, Cairns, Canberra, Christchurch, Colombo–Bandaranaike, Darwin, Denpasar, Gold Coast, Hervey Bay, Ho Chi Minh City, Hobart, Launceston, Nadi, Newcastle, Perth, Phuket, Proserpine, Queenstown, Singapore, Sunshine Coast, Sydney–Kingsford Smith, Sydney–Western, Townsville
Juneyao Air	Shanghai–Pudong
Korean Air	Seasonal: Seoul–Incheon (resumes 18 December 2026)
LATAM Chile	Santiago de Chile
Link Airways	Dubbo, Orange
Malaysia Airlines	Kuala Lumpur–International
Maldivian	Seasonal charter: Malé
Philippine Airlines	Manila
Qantas	Adelaide, Auckland, Brisbane, Cairns, Canberra, Christchurch, Dallas/Fort Worth, Darwin, Denpasar, Gold Coast, Hobart, Hong Kong, Jakarta–Soekarno-Hatta, London-Heathrow, Los Angeles, Perth, Queenstown, Singapore, Sunshine Coast, Sydney–Kingsford Smith, Tokyo–Narita, Wellington; Seasonal: Broome, Delhi
QantasLink	Adelaide, Brisbane, Burnie, Canberra, Coffs Harbour, Devonport, Hamilton Island, Hobart, Launceston, Mildura, Newcastle, Sydney–Western (begins 28 March 2027), Townsville
Qatar Airways	Auckland (begins 10 December 2026; ends 25 June 2027), Doha (Note: Some Qatar Airways flights stop at an intermediate domestic stop en route to their destination; however Qatar Airways has no traffic rights to carry passengers solely between Melbourne and the intermediate domestic stop.)
Rex Airlines	Burnie, King Island, Merimbula, Mildura, Mount Gambier, Wagga Wagga
Royal Brunei Airlines	Bandar Seri Begawan
Scoot	Singapore
Shenzhen Airlines	Shenzhen
Sichuan Airlines	Chengdu–Tianfu
Singapore Airlines	Singapore
SriLankan Airlines	Colombo–Bandaranaike
Thai Airways International	Bangkok–Suvarnabhumi
TransNusa	Denpasar
Turkish Airlines	Istanbul, Singapore
United Airlines	Los Angeles, San Francisco
VietJet Air	Ho Chi Minh City
Vietnam Airlines	Hanoi, Ho Chi Minh City
Virgin Australia	Adelaide, Brisbane, Cairns, Canberra, Darwin, Denpasar, Doha, Gold Coast, Hamilton Island, Hobart, Launceston, Nadi, Newcastle, Perth, Queenstown, Sunshine Coast, Sydney–Kingsford Smith
XiamenAir	Xiamen

Qantas also operates dedicated "flightseeing" services over Antarctica from Melbourne. These flights, using a Boeing 787 Dreamliner, depart Melbourne from Terminal 1, and provide a guided aerial tour of Antarctica before returning to Australia. These flights are about thirteen hours in total.

=== Cargo ===
Airlines	Destinations
ASL Airlines Australia	Auckland, Christchurch
Cathay Cargo	Hong Kong, Toowoomba
DHL Aviation	Auckland, Christchurch, Singapore, Sydney–Kingsford Smith
My Indo Airlines	Jakarta–Soekarno-Hatta
Qantas Freight	Adelaide, Auckland, Brisbane, Cairns, Christchurch, Gold Coast, Hobart, Launceston, Perth, Sydney–Kingsford Smith, Sydney–Western
Singapore Airlines Cargo	Auckland, Singapore
Tasman Cargo Airlines	Auckland, Singapore

== Traffic and statistics ==
In 2016–17 Melbourne Airport recorded around 25 million domestic passenger movements and around 10 million international passenger movements. In that year there were 239,466 aircraft movements in total. Melbourne Airport was tipped to record 47 million passengers in the year to 30 June 2020, before the pandemic hit, but instead recorded 27.2 million as state and international borders were closed. Melbourne is the second busiest airport in Australia for passenger movements, behind Sydney and ahead of Brisbane.

=== Total annual passengers ===
Annual passenger statistics for Melbourne Airport
Year	Domestic	International	Total	Change
1986	5,164,516	1,174,440	6,682,718	▲4.5%
1987	5,699,956	1,418,691	7,118,647	▲7.4%
1988	6,176,184	1,539,270	7,715,454	▲8.4%
1989	4,895,075	1,629,282	6,524,357	▼ -15.4%
1990	6,143,657	1,717,191	7,860,848	▲20.5%
1991	7,939,506	1,703,956	9,643,372	▲22.7%
1992	8,172,013	1,737,596	9,909,969	▲2.8%
1993	8,646,398	1,847,877	10,494,273	▲5.9%
1994	9,619,815	1,871,508	11,491,323	▲9.5%
1995	10,481,695	2,011,154	12,492,849	▲8.7%
1996	11,097,264	2,193,309	13,290,573	▲6.4%
1997	11,127,711	2,373,135	13,600,846	▲2.3%
1998	11,429,141	2,489,132	13,918,273	▲1.8%
1999	11,900,956	2,654,807	14,555,763	▲4.1%
2000	12,933,747	3,043,629	15,977,376	▲8.7%
2001	13,265,849	3,315,572	16,581,421	▲2.6%
2002	12,883,149	3,313,751	16,196,900	▼ -2.9%
2003	14,021,489	3,199,534	17,221,023	▲8.8%
2004	15,812,950	3,936,435	19,749,385	▲12.8%
2005	16,505,127	4,224,635	20,729,762	▲4.4%
2006	17,276,578	4,291,290	21,567,868	▲4.7%
2007	18,185,325	4,565,084	22,750,409	▲5.3%
2008	19,835,386	4,732,544	24,567,930	▲9.1%
2009	19,755,218	5,130,352	24,885,570	▼ -0.4%
2010	21,522,253	5,872,511	27,394,764	▲8.9%
2011	21,206,546	6,460,958	27,667,504	▼ -1.5%
2012	22,098,350	6,819,242	28,917,592	▲4.2%
2013	22,908,284	7,312,143	30,220,427	▲3.7%
2014	23,364,327	8,022,466	31,386,793	▲2.0%
2015	23,930,897	8,859,316	32,790,213	▲2.4%
2016	24,732,603	9,642,586	34,375,189	▲3.4%
2017	25,235,738	10,323,782	35,559,520	▲2.0%
2018	25,692,745	11,223,884	36,916,629	▲1.8%
2019	25,815,647	11,318,644	37,134,291	▲0.5%
2020	6,462,941	2,434,451	8,897,392	▼ -75.0%
2021	6,763,686	396,590	7,160,276	▲4.7%
2022	20,309,831	5,381,023	25,690,854	▲200.3%
2023	22,504,461	8,278,905	30,783,366	▲17%
2024	24,091,510	11,036,457	35,127,967	▲14.1%
2025	24,198,353	11,953,262	36,151,615	▲2.9%

=== Domestic ===
Busiest domestic routes – Melbourne Airport (Year ending 31 December 2025)
Rank	Airport	Passengers handled	Change
1	Sydney	8,121,200	▲1.0%
2	Brisbane	3,646,100	▲4.2%
3	Adelaide	2,395,800	▲2.8%
4	Gold Coast	2,146,900	▼ -1.9%
5	Perth	2,109,200	▲3.9%
6	Hobart	1,460,500	▲6.4%
7	Canberra	979,100	▼ -3.0%
8	Launceston	898,100	▲4.9%
9	Cairns	878,100	▲6.5%
10	Sunshine Coast	761,000	▲2.5%
11	Newcastle	470,600	▲2.9%
12	Darwin	292,700	▲1.2%
13	Mildura	152,400	▼ -4.6%
14	Devonport	148,800	▲19.4%
15	Ayers Rock	112,800	▲5.1%

=== International ===
Busiest international routes – Melbourne Airport (year ending 30 June 2026)
Rank	Airport	Passengers	Airlines
1	Singapore	1,739,044	Jetstar, Qantas, Scoot, Singapore Airlines, Turkish Airlines
2	Denpasar	1,146,291	Batik Air Malaysia, Garuda Indonesia, Jetstar, Qantas, Virgin Australia
3	Auckland	1,091,173	Air New Zealand, Jetstar, Qantas
4	Hong Kong	781,290	Cathay Pacific, Hong Kong Airlines, Qantas
5	Kuala Lumpur	697,340	AirAsia X, Batik Air Malaysia, Malaysia Airlines
6	Dubai	555,504	Emirates
7	Bangkok	509,911	Jetstar, Thai Airways International
8	Ho Chi Minh City	488,538	Jetstar, VietJet Air, Vietnam Airlines
9	Shanghai	404,295	China Eastern Airlines, Juneyao Air
10	Guangzhou	393,969	China Southern Airlines
11	Doha	383,051	Qatar Airways
12	Christchurch	381,242	Air New Zealand, Jetstar, Qantas
13	Los Angeles	296,177	Delta Air Lines, Qantas,United Airlines
14	Nadi	285,501	Fiji Airways, Jetstar, Virgin Australia
15	Queenstown	282,311	Air New Zealand, Jetstar, Qantas, Virgin Australia

=== Cargo ===
Busiest international freight routes into and out of Melbourne Airport (year ending 31 December 2021)
Rank	Airport	Freight tonnes handled	% change
1	Singapore	69,873	▲ +57.8%
2	Hong Kong	29,662	▲ +8.4%
3	Doha	28,261	▲ +24.4%
4	Auckland	20,993	▲ +5.5%
5	Kuala Lumpur	11,500	▼ −5.6%
6	Dubai	11,405	▼ −33.9%
7	Guangzhou	8,530	▼ −17.5%
8	Shanghai	7,939	▼ −26.4%
9	Abu Dhabi	7,759	▼ −11.5%
10	Los Angeles	7,594	▲ +81.9%

== Accidents and incidents ==
- On 29 May 2003, Qantas Flight 1737 from Melbourne to Launceston Airport was subjected to an attempted hijacking shortly after takeoff. The hijacker, a passenger named David Robinson, intended to fly the aircraft into the Walls of Jerusalem National Park, located in central Tasmania. The flight attendants and passengers successfully subdued and restrained the hijacker, and the aircraft returned to Melbourne.
- On 20 March 2009, Emirates Flight 407, an Airbus A340-500, was taking off from Melbourne Airport on Runway 16 for a flight to Dubai International Airport and failed to become airborne in the normal distance. When the aircraft was nearing the end of the runway, the crew commanded nose-up sharply, causing its tail to scrape along the runway as it became airborne, during which smoke was observed in the cabin. The crew dumped fuel over Port Phillip Bay and successfully returned to Melbourne. The damage caused to the airport was considered substantial, with a damaged strobe light at the end of the runway as well as an antenna on the localiser, which led to the ILS being out of service for some time causing some disruptions to the airport's operation.

== Awards and accolades ==
Melbourne Airport has received numerous awards. The International Air Transport Association ranked Melbourne among the top five airports in the world in 1997 and 1998. In 2003, Melbourne received the IATA's Eagle Award for service and two National Tourism Awards for tourism services.

The airport has received recognition in other areas. It has won national and state tourism awards, and Singapore Airlines presented the airport with the Service Partner Award and Premier Business Partner Award in 2002 and 2004, respectively. In 2006, the airport won the Australian Construction Achievement Award for the runway widening project, dubbed "the most outstanding example of construction excellence for 2006". In 2012, Parkroyal Melbourne Airport was awarded for the best airport hotel in Australia/the Pacific by Skytrax. According to Skytrax World's Top 100 Airports List, Melbourne Airport improved from being ranked 43rd in 2012 to 27th in 2018.

== Ground transport ==
=== Road ===
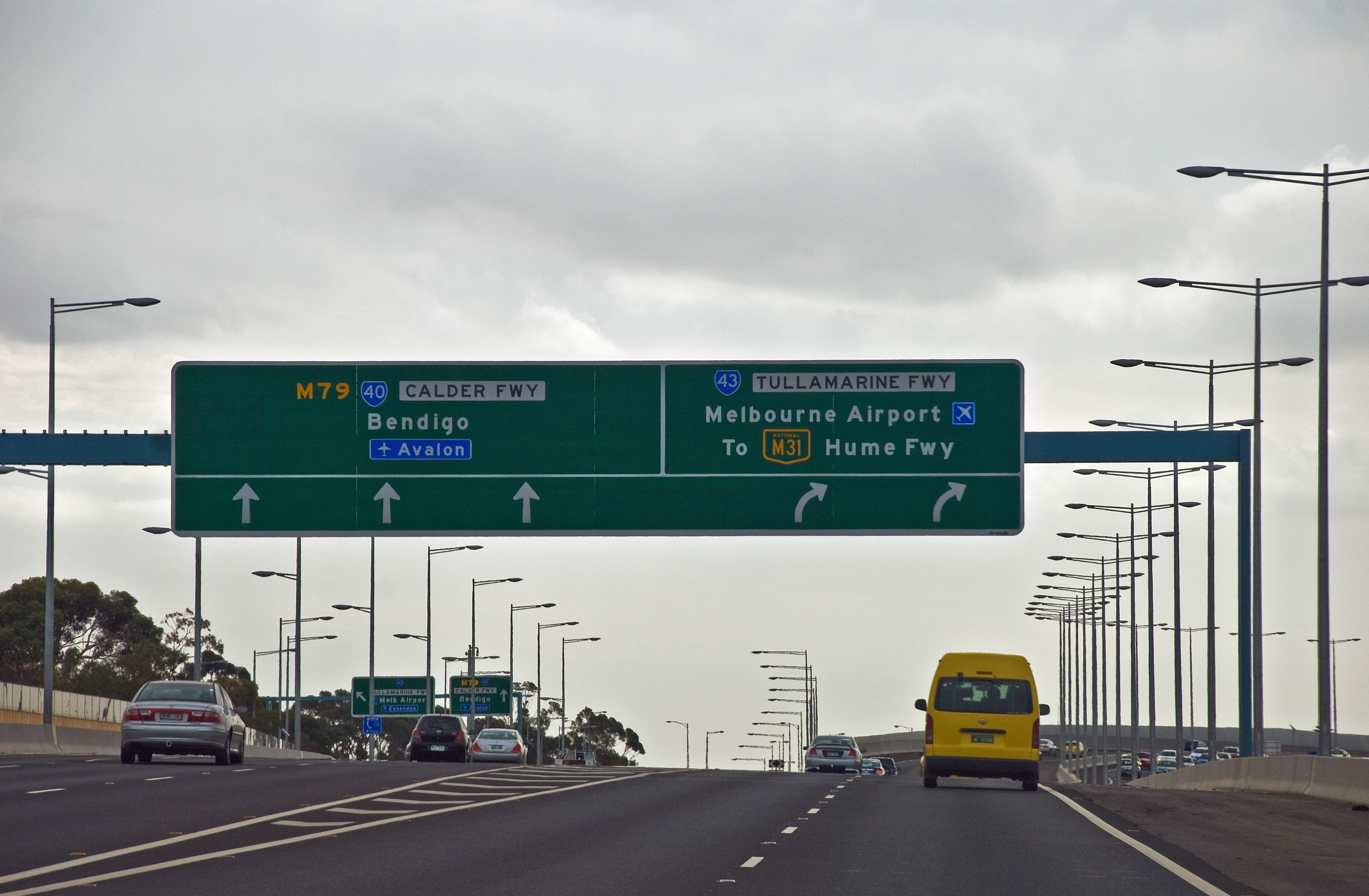
Tullamarine Freeway at the Calder Freeway interchange

Melbourne Airport is 23 km (14 mi) from the city centre and is accessible via the Tullamarine Freeway. One freeway offramp runs directly into the airport grounds, and a second to the south serves freight transport, taxis, buses and airport staff. In June 2015, the Airport Drive extension was completed, creating a second major link to the airport. The link starts at the M80 Ring Road and provides direct access to Melrose Drive 1.5 kilometres from the terminal area. As of late 2018 the Tullamarine Freeway was widened. In mid-2023, a new exit was constructed specifically for Terminal 4, omitting the other exits in favour of an elevated off-ramp.

Melbourne Airport has five car parks, all of which operate 24 hours a day, 7 days a week. The short-term, multi-level long-term, business and express carparks are covered, while the long-term parking is not. The main multi-level carpark in front of the terminal was built in the late 1990s, replacing the pre-existing ground-level car parking, progressively expanded ever since.

Melbourne Airport recorded more than 2.2 million taxi movements in the year to 30 June 2017.

=== Public transport ===
==== Bus and shuttle services ====
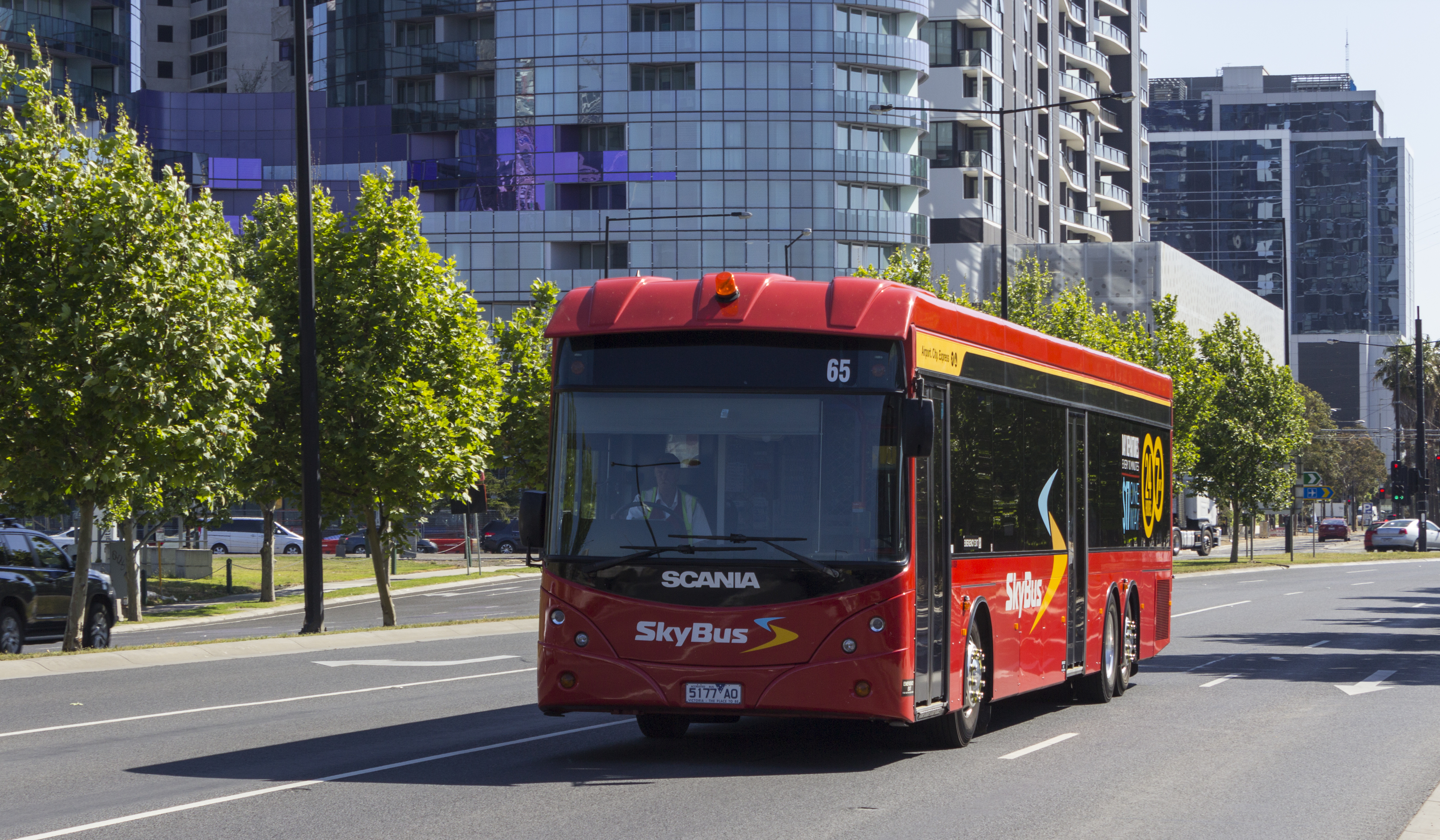
A SkyBus travelling to Melbourne Airport

The SkyBus operates express bus services from the airport to Southern Cross railway station (on the western boundary of the Melbourne central business district) and St Kilda. Shuttle services also operate between the airport and the Mornington Peninsula, making stops in St Kilda, Elsternwick, Brighton and Frankston. SkyBus current transports around 3.4 million passengers between the airport and Melbourne's CBD.

Metropolitan and regional public buses also operate to or via the airport. Routes 478, 479 and 482 operate to Airport West, via the route 59 tram terminus. Route 479 also operates to Sunbury railway station, connecting with Sunbury and Bendigo line trains. Route 901 was introduced in September 2010 as a frequent bus service. Route 901 connects to trains at Broadmeadows (Craigieburn, Seymour, Shepparton and Albury lines), Epping (Mernda line), Greensborough (Hurstbridge line) and Blackburn (Belgrave and Lilydale lines). V/Line operates timetabled regional coach services to Barham and Deniliquin which stop at the airport.

There are nine other bus companies serving the airport, with services to Ballarat, Bendigo, Dandenong, Frankston, Mornington Peninsula, Geelong, Melbourne's suburbs, Shepparton and the Riverina, which provide alternatives to transfer onto other V/Line services.

==== Future rail connection ====
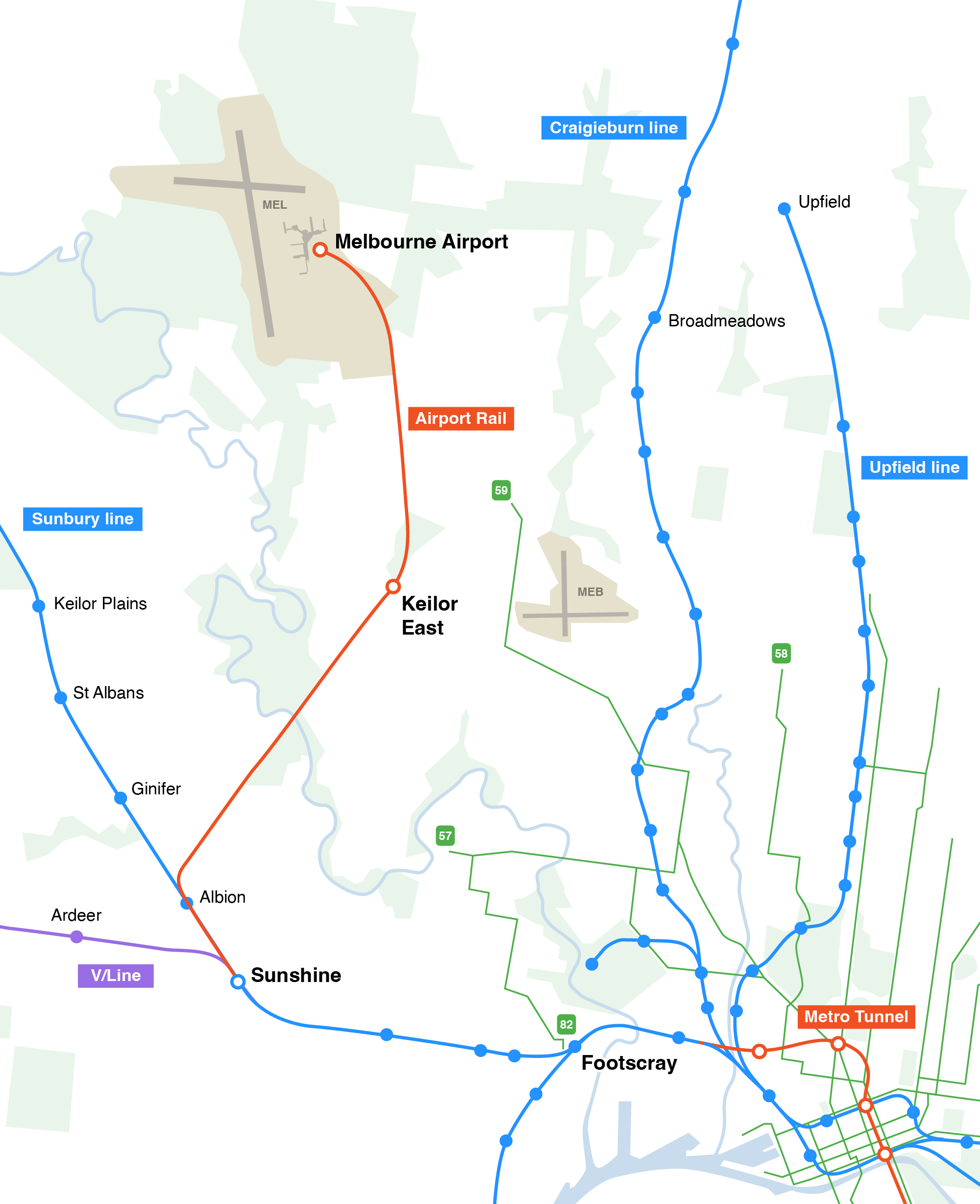
Map of the planned Melbourne Airport Rail route, which commenced early construction in 2022 and is set to open from 2033. The link will run through the Melbourne CBD via the Metro Tunnel.

Melbourne Airport does not have a passenger rail connection to and from the city. Constructing a rail link has been discussed in Victorian politics before and since Melbourne Airport opened in 1970.

In 2022, the Andrews state government commenced early construction on Melbourne Airport Rail (SRL Airport), which was first expected to be complete by 2029. However, in 2023–24, due to a lack of agreement in negotiations between the state government and the airport operator over the design of the Airport station, major construction has been delayed, with completion now expected by 2033. The 27 km link will run via Sunshine station in Melbourne's west into the central city via the under-construction Metro Tunnel. The link will connect to western regional rail services at Sunshine and to other services on the Metropolitan rail network at Sunshine, Footscray, State Library and Town Hall in the CBD, and Caulfield. The link will be the first direct rail connection to the Airport.

The business case was released in 2022 and was revealed that the Airport station would be elevated at a height of around 6 storeys, minimising construction costs and time. The airport operator, Australia Pacific Airports Corporation (APAC), has initially objected to the elevated station, arguing for it to be built underground in order to safeguard future terminal expansion and improve connectivity to the proposed Suburban Rail Loop. In July 2024, Melbourne Airport agreed to the state government's preference for an elevated airport station, allowing detailed planning works to resume.

== See also ==
- City of Keilor – the former local government area of which Melbourne Airport was a part
- List of airports in Victoria
- Transport in Australia
