= Reginald G. Hall =

Tasmanian bushwalker, barrister and outdoor-equipment designer

Reg Hall
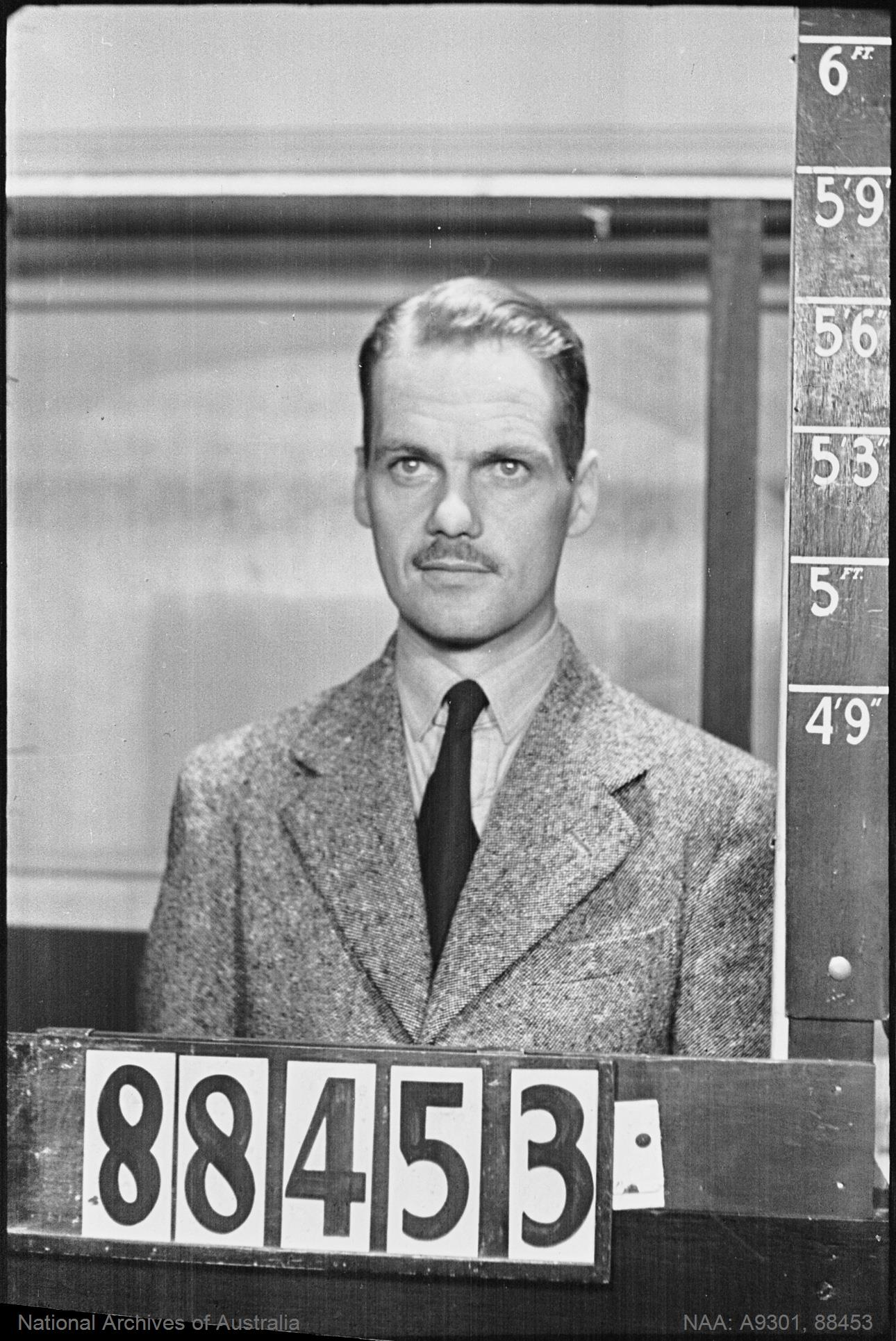
- Hall in his Royal Australian Air Force identity photograph, c. 1939–1948
- Born: Reginald George Hall; 30 December 1907; Launceston, Tasmania, Australia
- Spouse: Elizabeth Hall

Reginald G. Hall (1907–1981), referred to as Reg Hall, was a Tasmanian barrister, bushwalker, skier and designer of outdoor equipment and huts. He is closely associated with exploratory bushwalking on Tasmania's Central Plateau, particularly the Walls of Jerusalem area, where many of the biblical place names later adopted on official maps derived from names he used during the 1930s. He also designed lightweight bushwalking equipment and built a hut on Halls Island in Lake Malbena.

== Early life and legal career ==
Hall was born in 1907 and grew up in Launceston, Tasmania. According to Simon Cubit, time spent on the Tamar River encouraged his interest in boats, while scouting fostered his interest in the outdoors. Hall left Launceston High School in 1925 and became articled to a Launceston law firm. He was admitted to the bar in 1933.

During the Second World War, Hall served in the Royal Australian Air Force. He joined the RAAF in March 1943, spent time at Shepparton in Victoria, and in 1944 was posted to the RAAF's overseas headquarters in London. He was discharged in early 1947 after three years and ten months of service, nearly three years of which were spent overseas.

After returning to Tasmania, Hall worked for the Launceston legal firm Archer, Hall and Campbell. From 1953 he practised as a barrister on his own account, continuing until his retirement in 1979.

== Bushwalking and the Walls of Jerusalem ==
From 1928 Hall undertook a series of long exploratory bushwalks on Tasmania's Central Plateau. In 1928 he, Jack Branagan, Bill Evans, Hugh Merry and a dog named Bob walked from Western Creek, at the foot of the Great Western Tiers, to the West Coast Road near Lake St Clair. In the early 1930s Hall began walking into the Walls of Jerusalem from the Great Lake and from Western Creek. In 1935 he led a group on a long overland walk from Western Creek to Cradle Mountain via the Walls of Jerusalem and Pelion Plains.

The Walls of Jerusalem became Hall's best-known area of bushwalking activity. Cubit records that Hall made about twenty trips into the area between 1928 and 1938. At the time, only a limited number of local features had names on official surveys. Hall adopted and circulated names for features in the area, many of them continuing the biblical theme suggested by the name "Walls of Jerusalem".

In 1939 Hall travelled with Fred Smithies on a trip that ended with a walk south to Lake St Clair. At Smithies' prompting, Hall drew a rough map of the Walls of Jerusalem in the visitor book at Nichols Hut, near Lake St Clair. Smithies later wrote to the Nomenclature Board suggesting that Hall's names be adopted. Hall was then asked to prepare a map for the board, and when the first edition of the Du Cane map sheet was produced in 1956, most of the names he proposed had been accepted.

The Tasmania Parks and Wildlife Service states that from the 1930s to the 1960s Hall, described as a Launceston barrister, made numerous visits to the area and named more than a dozen features, continuing the biblical naming theme begun by surveyor James Scott. Features attributed by Cubit to Hall's naming include East Wall, West Wall, Wailing Wall, The Temple, Mt Ophel, Zion Hill, Zion Gate, Jaffa Gate, Damascus Gate, Herods Gate, Ephrams Gate, Gate of the Chain, Zion Vale, Jaffa Vale, Damascus Vale, Lake Tyre, Lake Salome, Lake Thor, Pool of Siloam and Pool of Bethesda.

== Equipment design and skiing ==
Hall designed and made much of his own bushwalking and skiing equipment. Cubit states that he made lightweight tents using materials such as parachute silk, developed a lightweight parka with a hood, pockets and a waist drawstring, and experimented with rucksacks using cane and tubular metal frames. He also incorporated zips into ski jackets, tents, trousers and small bags before they became common in outdoor equipment.

Hall was also associated with skiing and hut design. Through his connection with the Northern Tasmanian Alpine Club, he designed several private ski lodges on Ben Lomond, including Himminborg in 1933, Summit Hut in 1937, High Dudgeon in 1953, Ben Bullen in 1955 and Ben Bothie in 1961. He was a foundation member of the Launceston Bushwalking Club, formed in 1946, and became its patron in 1960. He was also a member of the board of the Cradle Mountain-Lake St Clair National Park from 1947 to 1970 and chairman of the Northern Scenery Board from 1966 to 1970.

== Lake Malbena and Halls Island ==
In the early 1950s Hall found an island in Lake Malbena, later known as Halls Island. After obtaining a lease from the Lands Department, he built a hut there over two summers with assistance from Dick Reed and Jim Berry. Materials were packed in on horseback from Gowan Brae, with some use of airdrops. Hall also designed and built a collapsible canvas canoe capable of carrying two people, which he and companions used in the lakes and mountains of the Central Plateau.

The Parks and Wildlife Service notes that Halls Island on Lake Malbena is named for Hall. Cubit records that after Hall's death, his Lake Malbena hut, papers, photographic collection and outdoor-equipment prototypes became part of later heritage discussions concerning the future of the island and hut.

== Later life and death ==
Hall suffered a heart attack in 1959, which limited his mobility and curtailed many of his outdoor activities. He continued to visit Lake Malbena for some years with assistance from Dick Reed and his horses, and also made several trips to the lake by amphibious aircraft owned by Stan Tilley. Cubit states that Hall's visits to the lake ceased after 1972 because of emphysema, and that the loss of the aircraft in a crash at Lake Naomi in 1975 ended later aerial access.

Hall died in 1981. Obituaries appeared in The Mercury in Hobart and The Examiner in Launceston in April 1981.

== Legacy ==
Hall's most visible legacy is the biblical naming pattern of many features in the Walls of Jerusalem area. Parks and Wildlife Service Tasmania describes him in bushwalking circles as "The Weindorfer of the Walls" and credits him with naming more than a dozen features in the park. His association with Lake Malbena is also reflected in the naming of Halls Island.

Cubit also identifies Hall as an important figure in Tasmanian bushwalking, skiing, hut-building and outdoor-equipment design. His surviving hut at Lake Malbena, together with his papers, photographs and equipment prototypes, has been treated as part of the cultural history of Tasmania's high country.
