= Lemonthyme Power Station =

Parangana Dam
- Location of the Parangana Dam in Tasmania
- Country: Australia
- Location: North-western Tasmania
- Coordinates: 41°37′48″S 146°13′12″E
- Purpose: Power
- Status: Operational
- Opening date: 1968
- Owner: Hydro Tasmania

Dam and spillways
- Type of dam: Embankment dam
- Impounds: Mersey River
- Height: 53 metres (174 ft)
- Length: 189 metres (620 ft)
- Dam volume: 382 thousand cubic metres (13.5×10^{6} cu ft)
- Spillways: 1
- Spillway type: Uncontrolled
- Spillway capacity: 2,093 cubic metres per second (73,900 cu ft/s)

Reservoir
- Creates: Lake Parangana
- Total capacity: 14,820 megalitres (523×10^{6} cu ft)
- Catchment area: 715 square kilometres (276 sq mi)
- Surface area: 11.4 hectares (28 acres)

Lemonthyme Power Station
- Coordinates: 41°36′14″S 146°08′19″E
- Operator: Hydro Tasmania
- Commission date: 1969
- Type: Run-of-the-river
- Hydraulic head: 139 metres (456 ft)
- Turbines: 1 x 54 MW (72,000 hp); Fuji Francis turbine
- Installed capacity: 54 megawatts (72,000 hp)
- Annual generation: 313 gigawatt-hours (1,130 TJ)
- Website hydro.com.au/energy/our-power-stations/mersey-forth

The Lemonthyme Power Station is a run-of-the-river hydroelectric power station located in north-western Tasmania, Australia. It is the fourth station in the Mersey–Forth run-of-river scheme that comprises seven hydroelectric power stations and one mini-hydro station.

== Technical details ==
The Parangana Dam forms Lake Parangana by damming the Mersey River. Water from the lake is diverted west to Lemonthyme Power Station via a 6.5-kilometre (4.0 mi)-long tunnel, followed by a 1.6-kilometre (0.99 mi) single surface penstock. The water then runs through the power station, and is discharged into the River Forth, then down to Lake Cethana.

The power station was commissioned in 1969 by the Hydro Electric Corporation (TAS). It has one Fuji Francis turbine, with a generating capacity of 54 megawatts (72,000 hp) of electricity. The station output, estimated to be 313 gigawatt-hours (1,130 TJ) annually, is fed to TasNetworks' transmission grid via two 3-phase 11 kV/220 kV Siemens generator transformers to the outdoor switchyard.

Although much of the water from Lake Parangana travels the approximately 8 km to the Lemonthyme Power Station (which discharges into the River Forth), some water is allowed to continue down the Mersey River for environmental reasons, after running through the Parangana mini hydro station.

== See also ==
- List of power stations in Tasmania
- List of run-of-the-river hydroelectric power stations
