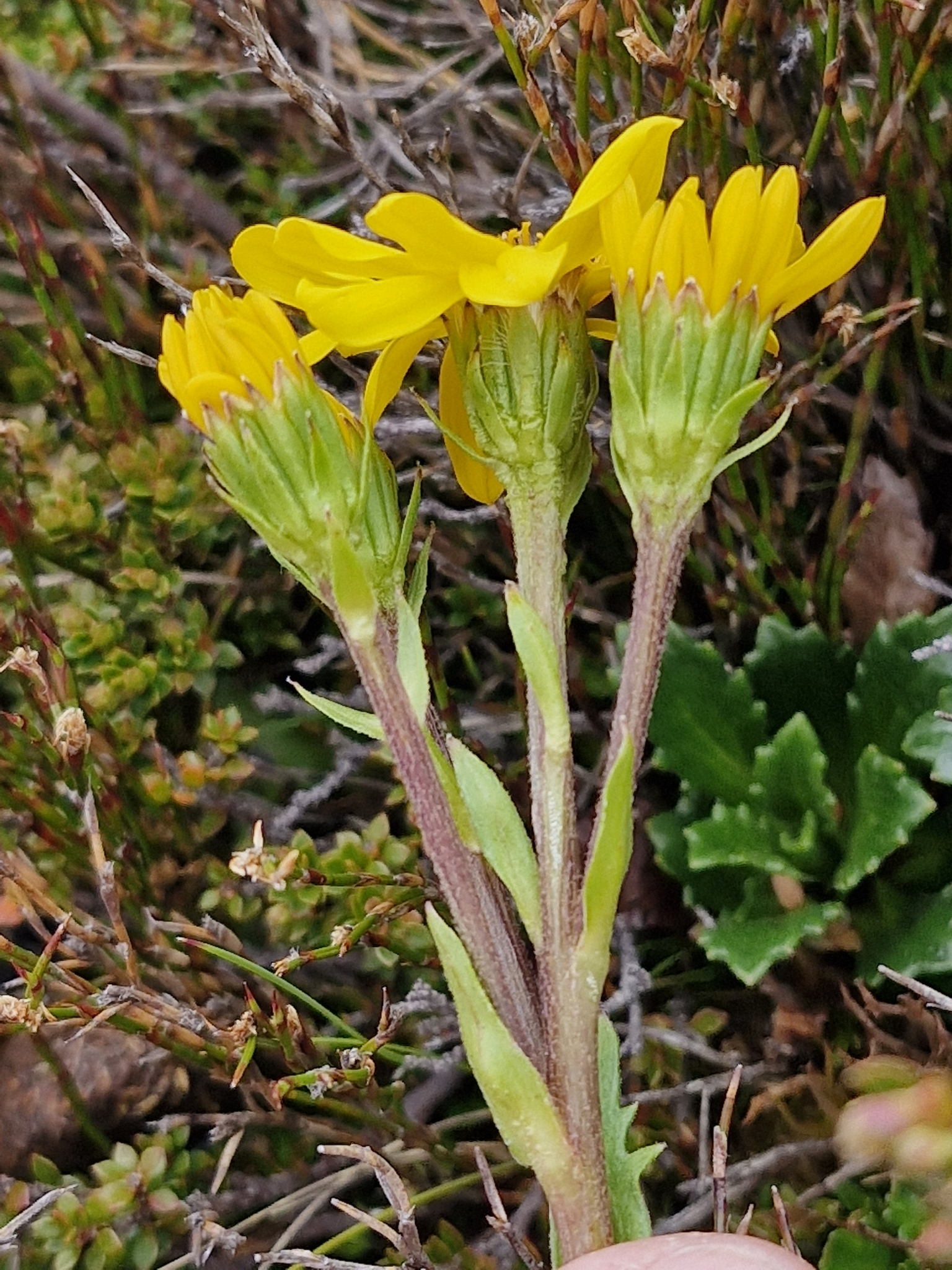
- Scapisenecio leptocarpus

Scientific classification
- Kingdom: Plantae
- Clade: Tracheophytes
- Clade: Angiosperms
- Clade: Eudicots
- Clade: Asterids
- Order: Asterales
- Family: Asteraceae
- Subfamily: Asteroideae
- Tribe: Senecioneae
- Genus: Scapisenecio; Schmidt-Leb.

Species
- See text.

= Scapisenecio =

Genus of plants

Scapisenecio is a genus of flowering plants in the family Asteraceae, native to south-eastern Australia, particularly Tasmania. The genus was established in 2020.

== Description ==
Species of the genus Scapisenecio are rhizomatous or stoloniferous herbaceous plants. Their fully developed leaves are located close to the base of the plant, often in a rosette. The flowering heads are borne on stems with smaller leaves, usually one flower head per stem. The ray florets are yellow or more rarely white.

== Taxonomy ==
The genus Scapisenecio was erected in 2020. A molecular phylogenetic study of Australian species placed in the tribe Senecioneae found that five species then placed in Senecio formed a clade that was clearly distinct from other Senecio species, genetically, morphologically, and in their distribution and ecology. Accordingly, a new genus was erected to include these five Australian species. The genus name refers to the growth habit in which the flower heads are borne on stems with reduced leaves (scapes).

=== Species ===
As of January 2023, Plants of the World Online accepted the following species:

- Scapisenecio albogilvus (I.Thomps.) Schmidt-Leb.
- Scapisenecio leptocarpus (DC.) Schmidt-Leb.
- Scapisenecio papillosus (F.Muell.) Schmidt-Leb.
- Scapisenecio pectinatus (DC.) Schmidt-Leb.
- Scapisenecio primulifolius (F.Muell.) Schmidt-Leb.

== Distribution and habitat ==
All the species of Scapisenecio are native to Tasmania. S. pectinatus is also found on the Australian mainland in New South Wales and Victoria; the other species are endemic to Tasmania. They are all found in subalpine to alpine habitats.
