= Rowallan Dam =

Dam and power station in north-western Tasmania

- Location of the dam in Tasmania
- Interactive map of Rowallan Dam
- Country: Australia
- Location: Northern Tasmania
- Coordinates: 41°43′51″S 146°12′55″E
- Purpose: Power
- Status: Operational
- Construction began: 1963
- Opening date: 1967
- Owner: Hydro Tasmania

Dam and spillways
- Type of dam: Rock-fill dam
- Impounds: Mersey River
- Height: 43 m (141 ft)
- Length: 579 m (1,900 ft)
- Dam volume: 497×10^{3} m^{3} (17.6×10^{6} cu ft)
- Spillways: 1
- Spillway type: Uncontrolled
- Spillway capacity: 665 m^{3}/s (23,500 cu ft/s)

Reservoir
- Creates: Lake Rowallan
- Total capacity: 130.49 GL (105,790 acre⋅ft)
- Active capacity: 121 GL (98,000 acre⋅ft)
- Catchment area: 345 km^{2} (133 sq mi)
- Surface area: 886 ha (2,190 acres)
- Normal elevation: 480 m (1,570 ft) AHD

Rowallan Power Station
- Operator: Hydro Tasmania
- Commission date: 1968
- Type: Run-of-the-river
- Hydraulic head: 49 m (161 ft)
- Turbines: 1 x 10.5 MW (14,100 hp) (Maier Francis-type)
- Installed capacity: 10.5 MW (14,100 hp)
- Capacity factor: 0.95
- Annual generation: 45 GWh (160 TJ)
- Website hydro.com.au

The Rowallan Dam is an earthen-faced rockfill embankment dam across the Mersey River, 25 kilometres (16 mi) south of Liena, in the northern region of Tasmania, Australia. Completed in 1967, the resultant reservoir, Lake Rowallan, was established for the purpose of generating hydro-electric power via the Rowallan Power Station, a run-of-the-river hydroelectric power station.

The dam, its reservoir, and the power station are owned and operated by Hydro Tasmania.

== Dam and reservoir overview ==
The Rowallan Dam comprises two earth and rockfill embankments either side of a free overflow reinforced concrete spillway. The dam wall is 43 metres (141 ft) high and 579 metres (1,900 ft) long. When full, Lake Rowallan has capacity of 130.49 gigalitres (105,790 acre⋅ft) and covers 886 hectares (2,190 acres), drawn from a catchment area of 345 square kilometres (133 sq mi). The single uncontrolled spillway is capable of discharging 665 cubic metres per second (23,500 cu ft/s).

In 2010, it was reported that the embankment was leaking; and in 2013, that the dam wall was moving. Repairs to stabilise the spillway were completed during 2012 and 2013; and rebuilding of the top seven metres (twenty-three feet) of the embankment occurred during 2015.

=== Reservoir ===
The associated Lake Rowallan is 11 kilometres (6.8 mi) long with a surface area of 9 square kilometres (3.5 sq mi), is 488 metres (1,601 ft) AHD and is bordered by Clumner Bluff and Howells Bluff. The reservoir is managed by the Tasmanian Inland Fisheries Service as a trout fishery; and is stocked with both brown and rainbow trout; there are also native climbing galaxias, spotted galaxias and river blackfish. Lake Rowallan is also the starting point for walks into nearby highland areas including the Walls of Jerusalem National Park.

== Hydroelectric power station ==
The Rowallan Power Station is part of the Mersey–Forth scheme that comprises seven run-of-the-river hydroelectric power stations and one mini-hydro power station. The first station in the scheme, the Rowallan Power Station is located in the river's upper reaches, approximately 200 metres (660 ft) downstream of Rowallan Dam, which forms Lake Rowallan. The dam is one of the two main headwater storages in the Mersey—Forth scheme and assists in regulating the water supply to four downstream power stations.

The power station was commissioned in 1971 by the Hydro Electric Corporation (TAS) and the station has one Maier Francis-type turbine, with a generating capacity of 10.5 megawatts (14,100 hp). The station output, estimated to be 45 gigawatt-hours (160 TJ) annually, is fed to TasNetworks' transmission grid via a 22 kV/110 kV transmission line to the switchyard transformer. Following use in the power station, water is returned to Lake Parangana.

An upgrade of the power station occurred during 2023 and 2024. Between 2021 and 2024, Hydro Tasmania was granted an exploration licence to assess the possibility of installing a pumped-storage plant near the existing conventional power station. The pumped-storage project did not proceed.

== Etymology ==
The dam, power station, and lake are named in honour of Thomas Corbett, 2nd Baron Rowallan, the former Governor of Tasmania.

== See also ==
- List of power stations in Tasmania
- List of reservoirs and dams in Australia § Tasmania
- List of lakes of Australia § Tasmania
