= Melbourne Airport (suburb) =

Suburb of Melbourne, Victoria, Australia

- Suburb
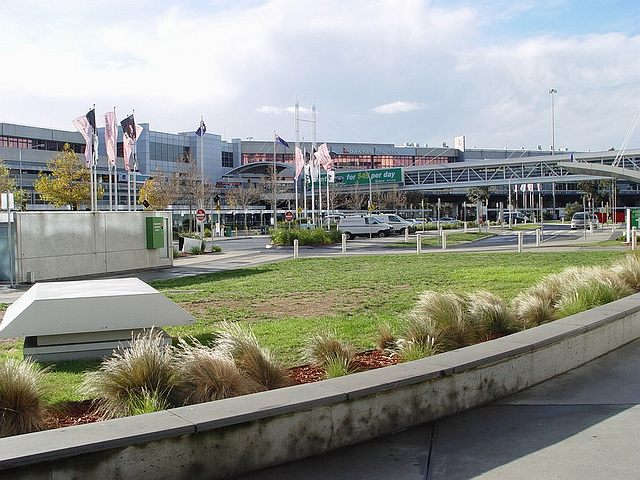

- Interactive map of Melbourne Airport
- Coordinates: 37°41′15″S 144°50′26″E
- Country: Australia
- State: Victoria
- City: Melbourne
- LGA: City of Hume
- Location: 19 km (12 mi) NW of Melbourne

Government
  - State electorate: Sunbury
  - Federal division: Maribyrnong

Population
  - Total: 126 (2021 census)
- Postcode: 3045

Melbourne Airport is a suburb in Melbourne, Victoria, Australia, 18 km (11 mi) north-west of Melbourne's Central Business District, located within the City of Hume local government area. Melbourne Airport recorded a population of 126 at the 2021 census.

The suburb is the location of Melbourne Airport and the Tullamarine Country Club. Since 2013, it has been home to The Hangar (previously the True Value Solar Centre), which is the training and administrative base for the Essendon Football Club and the Victorian arm of the Australian Paralympic Committee.

== Transport ==
=== Bus ===
Six bus routes service the Melbourne Airport suburb:

- 478 : Westfield Airport West – Melbourne Airport via Melrose Drive. Operated by CDC Melbourne.
- 479 : Westfield Airport West – Sunbury station via Melbourne Airport. Operated by CDC Melbourne.
- 482 : Westfield Airport West – Melbourne Airport via South Centre Road (peak hour only). Operated by CDC Melbourne.
- SmartBus 901 : Frankston station – Melbourne Airport. Operated by Kinetic Melbourne.
- A long term car park bus runs from the international terminal.
- A SkyBus hub is located at Melbourne Airport.

=== Train ===
If completed, the Melbourne Airport rail link is expected to provide rail services to the suburb and airport.

== See also ==
- City of Keilor – Parts of Melbourne Airport were previously within this former local government area.
- Shire of Bulla – Parts of Melbourne Airport were previously within this former local government area.
