= Walls of Jerusalem National Park =

National park in Tasmania, Australia

- IUCN category II (national park)
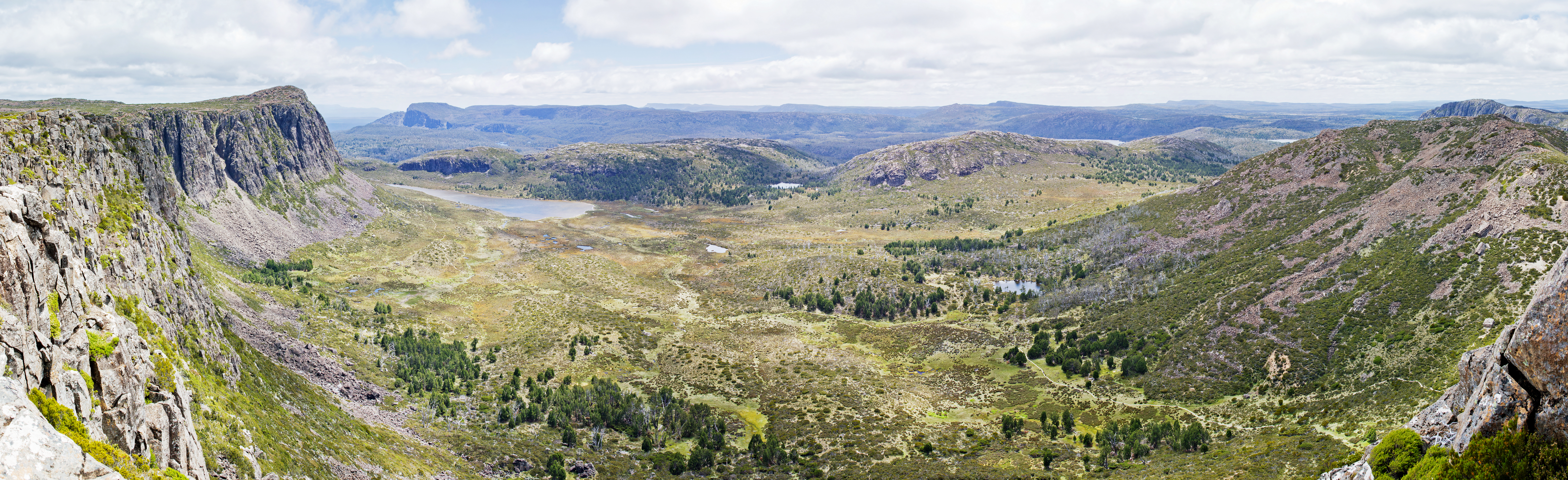
- Looking north west from Solomon's Throne. The prominent peak on the left is King Davids Peak. The Temple is on the right with Mount Jerusalem behind.

- Location within Tasmania
- Interactive map of Walls of Jerusalem National Park
- Location: Tasmania
- Nearest city: Mole Creek
- Coordinates: 41°52′08″S 146°15′31″E
- Area: 518 km^{2} (200 sq mi)
- Established: 13 December 1978
- Governing body: Tasmania Parks and Wildlife Service
- Website: Official website

UNESCO World Heritage Site
- Criteria: Cultural: iii, iv, vi, vii; natural: viii, ix, x
- Reference: 181
- Inscription: 1982 (6th Session)

The Walls of Jerusalem National Park is a national park located in the Central Highlands region of Tasmania, Australia. The park is located approximately 144 km (89 mi) northwest of Hobart, east of the Cradle Mountain-Lake St Clair National Park, and west of the Central Plateau Conservation Area. It is south of Mole Creek, Tasmania, and Rowallan Lake. The national park forms part of the Tasmanian Wilderness World Heritage Area.

The locality of Walls of Jerusalem is in the local government areas of Central Highlands (36%) and Meander Valley (64%) in Tasmania. The locality is about 244 kilometres (152 mi) north-west of the town of Hamilton.

== Etymology and History ==
The park was named by Reginald G. Hall and its name from the geological features of the park which are thought to resemble the walls of the city of Jerusalem. As a result, many places and features within the park also have Biblical references for names, such as Herods Gate, Lake Salome, Solomons Jewels, Damascus Gate, the Pool of Bethesda.

== Features ==
The most prominent feature of the park is King Davids Peak with an elevation of 1,509 metres (4,951 ft) above sea level.

Much of the walking track consists of raised boards, from Wild Dog Creek through to Dixon's Kingdom, with the purpose of protecting the fragile alpine vegetation. Walking tracks elsewhere in the park consist of rock, rocky earth, grassland and marsh.

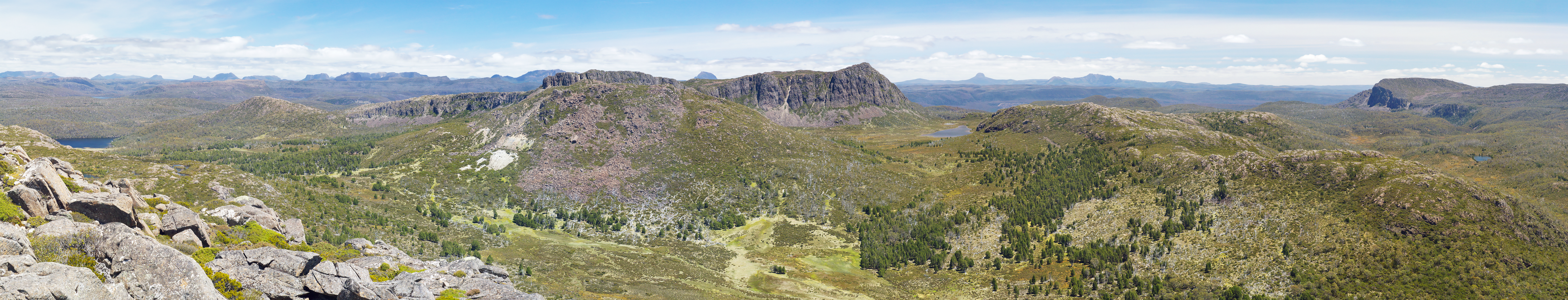
Looking west from Mt Jerusalem. King Davids Peak is centre right. The Temple is in the foreground centre left with Solomon's Throne behind. The peaks behind in the distance are in the Cradle Mountain-Lake St Clair National Park.

== In film ==
Some scenes for the second episode of the BBC documentary series Walking with Dinosaurs were filmed here.

== Geography ==
The locality has an area of 517.7 square kilometres (199.9 sq mi), all of which is occupied by the national park.

== Road infrastructure ==
The C171 route (Mersey Forest Road) runs south just outside the north-western boundary (in the locality of Mersey Forest) to the Walls of Jerusalem car park, where it ends.

== See also ==
- Protected areas of Tasmania
- Savage River National Park
- Qantas Flight 1737
