= Frankford, Tasmania =

Frankford Tasmania
- Coordinates: 41°19′56″S 146°45′55″E
- Population: 176 (2016 census)
- Postcode(s): 7275
- Location: 46 km (29 mi) NW of Launceston
- LGA(s): Latrobe, West Tamar, Meander Valley
- Region: North West
- State electorate(s): Braddon, Bass, Lyons
- Federal division(s): Braddon, Bass, Lyons
Localities around Frankford:
Harford	Bakers Beach	Beaconsfield
Sassafras	Frankford	Holwell, Winkleigh, Glengarry
Parkham	Reedy Marsh	Birralee

Frankford is a locality and small rural community in the local government areas of Latrobe (in the north), West Tamar (in the east), and Meander Valley (in the west), in the North West region of Tasmania. It is located about 46 kilometres (29 mi) north-west of the town of Launceston. The 2016 census determined a population of 176 for the state suburb of Frankford.

== History ==
The name first appeared on a map in 1883. The locality was gazetted in 1966.

== Geography ==
The locality consists of a valley with higher ground on either side, but does not contain a major stream. Most of it is drained by the Franklin Rivulet, which runs to the north-west and discharges into the Rubicon Estuary. The southern tip has creeks that run south to the Meander River, while part of the south-east drains east to the Supply River, which discharges into the Tamar River.

== Road infrastructure ==
The B71 route (Frankford Road) runs through the locality from south-east to north-west. Route C715 (Holwell Road) starts at an intersection with B71 and runs north before exiting. Route B72 (Birralee Road) starts at an intersection with B71 on the south-east boundary and runs away to the south.
