= Garden Island =

Garden Island may refer to:

== Australia ==
- Garden Island (New South Wales), location of major naval and dockyard facilities on Sydney Harbour
  - Garden Island Naval Chapel
- Garden Island (Huon River), an island in south-eastern Tasmania
- Garden Island (Tamar River), an island in northern Tasmania
- Garden Island (Western Australia), near Perth, location of HMAS Stirling naval base
- Garden Island (South Australia), an island in South Australia
  - Garden Island, South Australia, a locality associated with the island of the same name
- Garden Island, a historical name for Smooth Island (Tasmania)
- Grindal Island, South Australia, also known as Garden Island

== Canada ==
- Garden Island (Lake Huron), an island of Ontario
- Garden Island (Lake Nipissing), an island of Ontario
- Garden Island (Ontario), Lake Ontario

== United States ==
- Garden Island (Michigan)
- Garden Island State Recreation Area, Minnesota
- A nickname for the Hawaiian island of Kauai
- The Garden Island, the daily newspaper serving the island of Kauai

== See also ==
- Garden Isle, a 1973 short film
- Gardiner Island (disambiguation)
- Gardner Island, Antarctica
