= Harford, Tasmania =

Harford
- Town
- Coordinates: 41°14′18″S 146°33′24″E
- Country: Australia
- State: Tasmania
- Region: North West Tasmania
- LGA: Latrobe
- Location: 25 km (16 mi) E of Devonport

Government
  - State electorate: Braddon
  - Federal division: Braddon

Population
  - Total: 74 (2016 census)
- Postcode: 7307
Localities around Harford
Thirlstane	Bakers Beach	Bakers Beach
Moriarty	Harford	Frankford
Sassafras	Sassafras	Frankford

Harford is a locality and small rural community in the local government area of Latrobe, in the North West region of Tasmania. It is located about 25 kilometres (16 mi) east of the town of Devonport. The shores of Port Sorell (the bay, not the town) form part of the northern boundary, while Branch Creek is also a part. The Rubicon River forms part of the western boundary. The 2016 census determined a population of 74 for the state suburb of Harford.

== History ==
The locality was previously called “Heidelberg”. It was renamed “Harford” for the Parish in which it was located. The name may have been derived from Harford in England.

== Road infrastructure ==
The C704 (Oppenheims Road), C706 (East Sassafras Road), and C713 (Chapel Road) routes all run from the Bass Highway to the locality, where they provide access via the B71 route (Frankford Road) to many localities in northern Tasmania.
