= Bakers Beach, Tasmania =

Bakers Beach
- Town
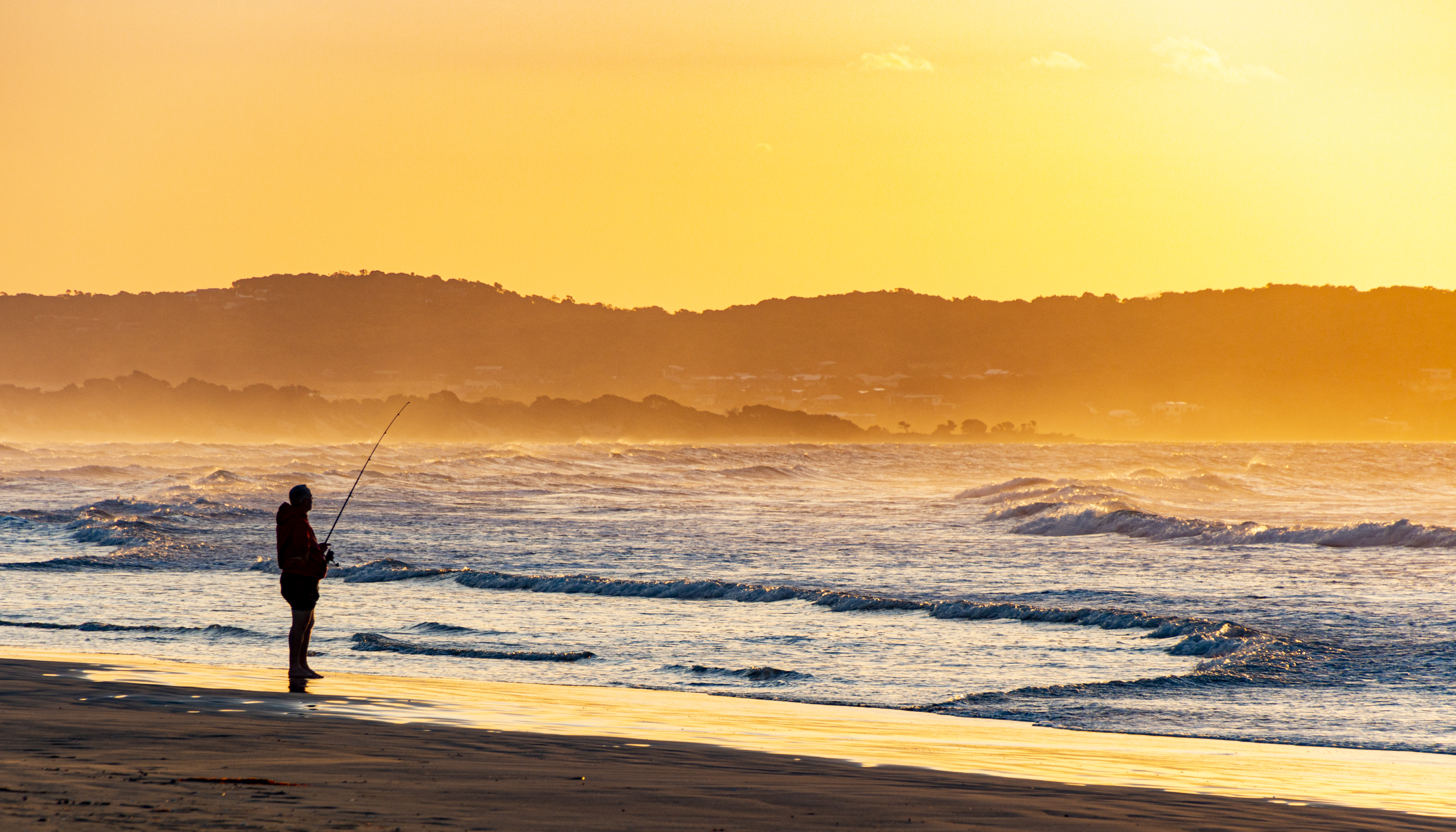

- Coordinates: 41°09′44″S 146°36′16″E
- Country: Australia
- State: Tasmania
- Region: North West
- LGA: Latrobe
- Location: 76 km (47 mi) NW of Launceston

Government
  - State electorate: Braddon
  - Federal division: Braddon

Population
  - Total: 60 (2016 census)
- Postcode: 7307
Localities around Bakers Beach
| Bass Strait | Bass Strait | Badger Head |
| Port Sorell, Squeaking Point | Bakers Beach | York Town |
| Thirlstane | Harford | Beaconsfield |

Bakers Beach is a locality and small rural community in the local government area of Latrobe in the North West region of Tasmania. It is located about 76 kilometres (47 mi) north-west of the town of Launceston. The 2016 census determined a population of 60 for the state suburb of Bakers Beach.

== History ==
The area was first settled in 1833 by George Hall, and remained a farm until 1974. The beach was named for the second owner, Edwin Baker.

== Geography ==
The shore of Bass Strait forms the northern boundary and the waters of the Rubicon Estuary abut the western boundary.

== Road infrastructure ==
The C740 route (Bakers Beach Road) runs through the locality from south to north, terminating at the Narawntapu National Park. Route C741 (Browns Creek Road) starts at an intersection with C740 and runs through from west to east, where it follows the eastern boundary for a short distance before continuing into York Town.
