= Moriarty, Tasmania =

Moriarty
- Town
- Coordinates: 41°13′02″S 146°29′01″E
- Country: Australia
- State: Tasmania
- Region: North West Tasmania
- LGA: Latrobe
- Location: 14 km (8.7 mi) E of Devonport

Government
  - State electorate: Braddon
  - Federal division: Braddon

Population
  - Total: 223 (2016 census)
- Postcode: 7307
Localities around Moriarty
Wesley Vale	Northdown	Thirlstane
Wesley Vale	Moriarty	Thirlstane
Latrobe	Sassafras	Sassafras

Moriarty is a locality and small rural community in the local government area of Latrobe, in the North West region of Tasmania. It is located about 14 kilometres (8.7 mi) east of the town of Devonport. The 2016 census determined a population of 223 for the state suburb of Moriarty.

== History ==
The locality is believed to have been named for Lucinda Moriarty, a prominent early settler.

== Road infrastructure ==
The C702 (Moriarty Road) and C704 (Oppenheims Road) routes run from the Bass Highway through the locality, from where they provide access to many other localities in northern Tasmania. The B71 route (Frankford Road), which runs from the B74 route (Bass Highway to Port Sorell) in East Devonport to Exeter on the West Tamar Highway, passes through the locality.
