= Results of the 1939 Tasmanian local elections =

- 27 April 1939

This is a list of local government area results for the 1939 Tasmanian local elections.

== Burnie ==
1939 Burnie Municipal Council election
- 27 April 1939

4 seats on Burnie Municipal Council
	First party
	IND
Party	Independent
Seats won	4
Seat change	Steady
Primary vote	1,397
Percentage	100.0%

Elections were held in three of the four wards of the four wards on Burnie Municipal Council. In Hampshire Ward, incumbent councillor Charles Lacey was re-elected unopposed.

In North Ward, longtime councillor T. L. Mace did not seek re-election. The seat was contested by George Sorell, the manager of the Burnie branch of the Bank of Australasia, and well-known local businessman Stanley Alford.

In South Ward, incumbent councillor Samuel Bird was challenged by company manager James Jakins. In Stowport Ward, councillor Leonard Ling was challenged by farmer Leopold Clark.

=== Hampshire ===
1939 Tasmanian local elections: Burnie (Hampshire Ward)
Party	Candidate	Votes	%	±%
Independent	Charles Leslie Lacey	unopposed		
Registered electors				
Independent hold				

=== North ===
1939 Tasmanian local elections: Burnie (North Ward)
Party	Candidate	Votes	%	±%
Independent	Stanley James Alford	246	54.79	
Independent	George Sorell	203	45.21	
Total formal votes		449	99.56	
Informal votes		2	0.44	
Turnout		451		
Independent gain from Independent				

=== South ===
1939 Tasmanian local elections: Burnie (South Ward)
Party	Candidate	Votes	%	±%
Independent	Samuel Bird	477	69.64	
Independent	James Alfred Jakins	208	30.36	
Total formal votes		685	99.14	
Informal votes		6	0.86	
Turnout		691		
Independent hold				

=== Stowport ===
1939 Tasmanian local elections: Burnie (Stowport Ward)
Party	Candidate	Votes	%	±%
Independent	Leonard Ling	164	62.36	
Independent	Leopold Francis Clark	99	37.64	
Total formal votes		263	97.77	
Informal votes		6	2.23	
Turnout		269		
Independent hold				

== Deloraine ==
1939 Deloraine Municipal Council election
- 27 April 1939

5 seats on Deloraine Municipal Council

Central Ward was the only ward in Deloraine to feature a contested race as two newcomers competed to replace Cr. R. P. Furmage who did not seek re-election. Newcomer Athol Symmons was re-elected unopposed to replace the previous Warden who had moved to Leith. The incumbent councillors of the remaining wards were likewise returned to their posts unopposed.

=== Central ===
1939 Tasmanian local elections: Central Ward
Party	Candidate	Votes	%	±%
Independent	John Daniel Best			
Independent	Thomas Sullivan			
Total formal votes				
Informal votes				
Turnout				
gain from R. P. Furmage				

=== High Plains ===
1939 Tasmanian local elections: High Plains Ward
Party	Candidate	Votes	%	±%
Independent	Athol Symmons	unopposed		
Total formal votes				
Informal votes				
Turnout				
Athol Symmons gain from D. K. Cameron				

=== Meander ===
1939 Tasmanian local elections: Meander Ward
Party	Candidate	Votes	%	±%
Independent	Charles W. Chilcott	unopposed		
Total formal votes				
Informal votes				
Turnout				
Charles W. Chilcott hold				

=== Midhurst ===
1939 Tasmanian local elections: Midhurst Ward
Party	Candidate	Votes	%	±%
Independent	James N. Griffin	unopposed		
Total formal votes				
Informal votes				
Turnout				
James N. Griffin hold				

=== Chudleigh ===
1939 Tasmanian local elections: Chudleigh Ward
Party	Candidate	Votes	%	±%
Independent	Walter A. Oliver	unopposed		
Total formal votes				
Informal votes				
Turnout				
Walter A. Oliver hold				

== Devonport ==
1939 Devonport Municipal Council election
- 27 April 1939

3 seats on Devonport Municipal Council

No elections were held as each ward only received a single nomination. The incumbent councillors of South Ward and Don Ward were both returned to their posts and Mr. M'Intyre, a solicitor, will assume Cr. A. W. Luck's seat as he did not seek re-election.

=== North ===
1939 Tasmanian local elections: North Ward
Party	Candidate	Votes	%	±%
Independent	John Allen Keverall Lewis M'Intyre	unopposed		
Total formal votes				
Informal votes				
Turnout				
M'Intyre gain from Luck				

=== South ===
1939 Tasmanian local elections: South Ward
Party	Candidate	Votes	%	±%
Independent	Edward Ingledew	unopposed		
Total formal votes				
Informal votes				
Turnout				
Edward Ingledew hold				

=== North ===
1939 Tasmanian local elections: Don Ward
Party	Candidate	Votes	%	±%
Independent	Herbert Augustus Vertigan	unopposed		
Total formal votes				
Informal votes				
Turnout				
Herbert Vertigan hold				

== Kentish ==
1939 Kentish Municipal Council election
- 27 April 1939

5 seats on Kentish Municipal Council

The then Warden, Councillor Lillico as well as Cr. Lowry were returned to their seats on council unopposed.

The incumbent councillors Morris and Frankcombe faced challengers in wards Sheffield and Railton respectively. Morris faced William Kirkland, a farmer who was well known in the community and had taken a recent but keen interest in public affairs. Frankcombe faced Thomas Doyle who had previously served on council for some time before retiring.

Councillor J. F. Cox did not seek re-election and Roland ward was contested by newcomer William Sherriff and Algernon Wooton who contested the ward at its vacancy the previous year.

=== Sheffield ===
1939 Tasmanian local elections: Sheffield Ward
Party	Candidate	Votes	%	±%
Independent	Cecil Reginald Morris			
Independent	William Robert Kirkland			
Total formal votes				
Informal votes				
Turnout				

=== Railton ===
1939 Tasmanian local elections: Railton Ward
Party	Candidate	Votes	%	±%
Independent	Kit Arnold Frankcombe			
Independent	Thomas Joseph Doyle			
Total formal votes				
Informal votes				
Turnout				

=== Roland ===
1939 Tasmanian local elections: Roland Ward
Party	Candidate	Votes	%	±%
Independent	William Thomas Sherriff			
Independent	Algernon Sydney Wooton			
Total formal votes				
Informal votes				
Turnout				

=== Wilmotg ===
1939 Tasmanian local elections: Wilmot Ward
Party	Candidate	Votes	%	±%
Independent	Alexander Elliot Davidson Lillico	unopposed		
Total formal votes				
Informal votes				
Turnout				
Alexander Lillico hold				

=== Barrington ===
1939 Tasmanian local elections: Barrington Ward
Party	Candidate	Votes	%	±%
Independent	Joseph Lowry	unopposed		
Total formal votes				
Informal votes				
Turnout				
Joseph Lowry hold				

== Latrobe ==
1939 Latrobe Municipal Council election
- 27 April 1939

3 seats on Latrobe Municipal Council

All wards held contests with the exception of Sassafras where the retiring Cr. Beveridge did not seek re-election, leaving farmer William Craigie to pick up the seat unopposed. In Sherwood Ward, Cr. Perkins faced a challenge from former Deputy Warden and Treasurer, Joseph d'Oliveyra who did no seek election 3 years ago. In Harford Ward, Cr. Cutts faced a challenge from Wesley Vale farmer Leslie Brown.

=== Harford ===
1939 Tasmanian local elections: Harford Ward
Party	Candidate	Votes	%	±%
Independent	Arthur Thomas Cutts			
Independent	Leslie Ely Brown			
Total formal votes				
Informal votes				
Turnout				

=== Sassafras ===
1939 Tasmanian local elections: Sassafras Ward
Party	Candidate	Votes	%	±%
Independent	William Clive Craigie	unopposed		
Total formal votes				
Informal votes				
Turnout				
Craigie gain from Beveridge				

=== Sherwood ===
1939 Tasmanian local elections: Sherwood Ward
Party	Candidate	Votes	%	±%
Independent	Valentine Perkins			
Independent	Joseph Theodore d'Oliveyra			
Total formal votes				
Informal votes				
Turnout				

== Leven ==
1939 Leven Municipal Council election
- 27 April 1939

4 seats on Leven Municipal Council

Councillors Beswick and Lakin of wards Castra and Ulverstone respectively were both returned to their posts unopposed.

In Abbotsham Ward Cr. Hamilton was challenged by Herbert Wright, a farmer and the son of the late Mr. T. Wright who was a long time member of council.

In Motton Ward Cr. Denham was challenged by Stanley Wing, a farmer from Preston.

=== Abbotsham ===
1939 Tasmanian local elections: Abbotsham Ward
Party	Candidate	Votes	%	±%
Independent	Walter Vanderleur Hamilton			
Independent	Herbert Wright			
Total formal votes				
Informal votes				
Turnout				

=== Castra ===
1939 Tasmanian local elections: Castra Ward
Party	Candidate	Votes	%	±%
Independent	Arthur Beswick	unopposed		
Total formal votes				
Informal votes				
Turnout				
Arthur Beswick hold				

=== Ulverstone ===
1939 Tasmanian local elections: Ulverstone Ward
Party	Candidate	Votes	%	±%
Independent	Maurice Oswald Lakin	unopposed		
Total formal votes				
Informal votes				
Turnout				
Maurice Lakin hold				

=== Motton ===
1939 Tasmanian local elections: Motton Ward
Party	Candidate	Votes	%	±%
Independent	John Dunham			
Independent	Stanley Edward Joseph Wing			
Total formal votes				
Informal votes				
Turnout				

== Penguin ==
1939 Penguin Municipal Council election
- 27 April 1939

3 seats on Penguin Municipal Council

No elections were held as each ward only received a single nomination. Wards Dial and Riana's incumbent councillors were returned to their posts and the incumbent councillor Harold Pyke of Heybridge Ward did not seek re-election and was replaced by Henry Elphinstone, a farmer form Cuprona.

=== Dial ===
1939 Tasmanian local elections: Dial Ward
Party	Candidate	Votes	%	±%
Independent	John Merelie Smith	unopposed		
Total formal votes				
Informal votes				
Turnout				

=== Riana ===
1939 Tasmanian local elections: Riana Ward
Party	Candidate	Votes	%	±%
Independent	Alphonsus Joseph Counsel	unopposed		
Total formal votes				
Informal votes				
Turnout				

=== Heybridge ===
1939 Tasmanian local elections: Heybridge Ward
Party	Candidate	Votes	%	±%
Independent	Henry William Elphinstone	unopposed		
Total formal votes				
Informal votes				
Turnout				

== Table Cape ==
1939 Table Cape Municipal Election
- 1939

4 seats on Table Cape Municipal Council

All wards held contests and all incumbent councillors sought reëlection. In Flowerdale Ward, Cr. Bauld was challenged by farmer William Scott from Lapoinya. In Calder Ward, Cr. Napier was challenged by Doctor's Rocks grazier Charles Busby who had been involved in a number of local organisations, most notably the Tourist Association. In Cam Ward, Cr. Mackenzie was challenged by Robert French, a store keeper and the postmaster at Somerset. In Wynyard Ward, Cr. Johnston was challenged by former councillor Charles Cunnings, a builder and contractor who lost his seat on the council at the election two years prior.

=== Flowerdale Ward ===
1939 Tasmanian local elections: Flowerdale Ward
Party	Candidate	Votes	%	±%
Independent	Llewellyn Gordon Stewart Bauld			
Independent	William Paterson Scott			
Total formal votes				
Informal votes				
Turnout				

=== Calder Ward ===
1939 Tasmanian local elections: Calder Ward
Party	Candidate	Votes	%	±%
Independent	Stewart L'Oste Napier			
Independent	Charles Culzean Busby			
Total formal votes				
Informal votes				
Turnout				

=== Cam Ward ===
1939 Tasmanian local elections: Cam Ward
Party	Candidate	Votes	%	±%
Independent	Charles Colin Mackenzie			
Independent	Robert Walton French			
Total formal votes				
Informal votes				
Turnout				

=== Wynyard Ward ===
1939 Tasmanian local elections: Wynyard Ward
Party	Candidate	Votes	%	±%
Independent	George Arthur Johnston			
Independent	Charles Ernest Cunnings			
Total formal votes				
Informal votes				
Turnout				

== Circular Head ==
1939 Circular Head municipal election
- 1939

5 seats on Circular Head Municipal Council

Three of the five wards held contests. The incumbent Cr. Dallas of Emmet Ward did not seek reëlection and no other nominations were received meaning the seat was left vacant and an extraordinary election was needed. In Horton Ward, Cr. Benny Young was returned to his post unopposed.

In Stanley Ward, Cr. Waters was challenged by Mr. Vincent Medwin, a farmer from Forest and son of the late Mr. Fergus Medwin. In Marrawah Ward, Cr. Wainwright was challenged by Mr. Horace Hardy, a Marrawah farmer.

In Mowbry Ward, the Warden, Cr. Sampson, faced a challenge from Mr. Donald Chisholm, who was an officer for the Forestry Department.

=== Stanley Ward ===
1939 Tasmanian local elections: Stanley Ward
Party	Candidate	Votes	%	±%
Independent	William Jarvis Waters			
Independent	Vincent Aubrey Medwin			
Total formal votes				
Informal votes				
Turnout				

=== Emmet Ward ===
1939 Tasmanian local elections: Emmet Ward
Party	Candidate	Votes	%	±%
No nominations received Extraordinary election needed
Total formal votes				
Informal votes				
Turnout				

=== Mowbray Ward ===
1939 Tasmanian local elections: Mowbray Ward
Party	Candidate	Votes	%	±%
Independent	Maurice Sampson			
Independent	Donald Wallace Chisholm			
Total formal votes				
Informal votes				
Turnout				

=== Horton Ward ===
1939 Tasmanian local elections: Horton Ward
Party	Candidate	Votes	%	±%
Independent	Benny Young (elected unopposed)			
Total formal votes				
Informal votes				
Turnout				
Benny Young hold				

=== Marrawah Ward ===
1939 Tasmanian local elections: Marrawah Ward
Party	Candidate	Votes	%	±%
Independent	George William Wainwright			
Independent	Horace Floyd Hardy			
Total formal votes				
Informal votes				
Turnout				
