= Northdown, Tasmania =

Northdown
- Town
- Coordinates: 41°10′41″S 146°29′40″E
- Country: Australia
- State: Tasmania
- Region: North West
- LGA: Latrobe
- Location: 82 km (51 mi) NW of Launceston

Government
  - State electorate: Braddon
  - Federal division: Braddon

Population
  - Total: 221 (2016 census)
- Postcode: 7307
Localities around Northdown
| Bass Strait | Bass Strait | Hawley Beach |
| Wesley Vale | Northdown | Port Sorell, Shearwater |
| Wesley Vale | Moriarty | Thirlstane |

Northdown is a locality and small rural community in the local government area of Latrobe in the North West region of Tasmania. It is located about 82 kilometres (51 mi) north-west of the town of Launceston. The 2016 census determined a population of 221 for the state suburb of Northdown.

== History ==
The name "Northdown" was given to a large house built in the area for Mr. Edward Curr in 1827. The locality was gazetted in 1962.

== Geography ==
Bass Strait forms the northern boundary.

== Road infrastructure ==
The B74 route (Port Sorell Road) runs through the locality from west to east. Route C703 (Wrights Lane) starts at an intersection with B74 and runs south before exiting. Route C707 (Appleby Road) starts at an intersection with B74 and runs south-east before exiting.
