= Squeaking Point =

- Town
- Coordinates: 41°11′28″S 146°33′22″E
- Country: Australia
- State: Tasmania
- Region: North West
- LGA: Latrobe
- Location: 76 km (47 mi) NW of Launceston

Government
  - State electorate: Braddon
  - Federal division: Braddon

Population
  - Total: 223 (2016 census)
- Postcode: 7307
Localities around Squeaking Point
Port Sorell	Port Sorell	Bakers Beach
Port Sorell	Squeaking Point	Bakers Beach
Thirlstane	Thirlstane	Bakers Beach

Squeaking Point is a locality and small rural community in the local government area of Latrobe in the North West region of Tasmania. It is located about 76 kilometres (47 mi) north-west of the town of Launceston. The 2016 census determined a population of 223 for the state suburb of Squeaking Point.

== History ==
The name dates from the early days of settlement. It was given to the area because of the noise made by some pigs that escaped from a ship. The official name was changed from “Moriarty” to Squeaking Point in 1948, and the locality was gazetted in 1967.

== Geography ==
The waters of the Rubicon Estuary form the eastern boundary.

== Road infrastructure ==
The C708 route (Woodbury Lane / Parkers Ford Road) runs through the locality from south to west. Route C709 (two separate roads) starts at two intersections with C708. Squeaking Point Road runs south-west before exiting, and Charles Street runs east to the shore of Rubicon Estuary.
