= Deviot =

Deviot may refer to:

- Deviot, Tasmania, a village in the West Tamar Council
- Deviot Sailing Club, Tasmania
- A character in Power Rangers
