= Thirlstane, Tasmania =

Thirlstane
- Town
- Coordinates: 41°11′51″S 146°32′03″E
- Country: Australia
- State: Tasmania
- Region: North West
- LGA: Latrobe
- Location: 76 km (47 mi) NW of Launceston

Government
  - State electorate: Braddon
  - Federal division: Braddon

Population
  - Total: 94 (2016 census)
- Postcode: 7307
Localities around Thirlstane
Northdown	Port Sorell	Squeaking Point
Moriarty	Thirlstane	Bakers Beach
Moriarty	Sassafras	Harford

Thirlstane is a locality and small rural community in the local government area of Latrobe in the North West region of Tasmania. It is located about 76 kilometres (47 mi) north-west of the town of Launceston. The 2016 census determined a population of 94 for the state suburb of Thirlstane.

== History ==
The name comes from a former estate in the area. The locality was gazetted in 1967.

== Geography ==
The waters of the Rubicon Estuary form part of the eastern boundary.

== Road infrastructure ==
The B71 route (Frankford Road) runs through the locality from east to west. Route C708 (Woodbury Lane) starts at an intersection with B71 on the south-eastern boundary and runs through from south-east to north-east. Route C709 (Squeaking Point Road) starts at an intersection with B71 and runs through from south-west to north-east. Route C707 (Appleby Road) starts at an intersection with C709 and runs north-west before exiting.
