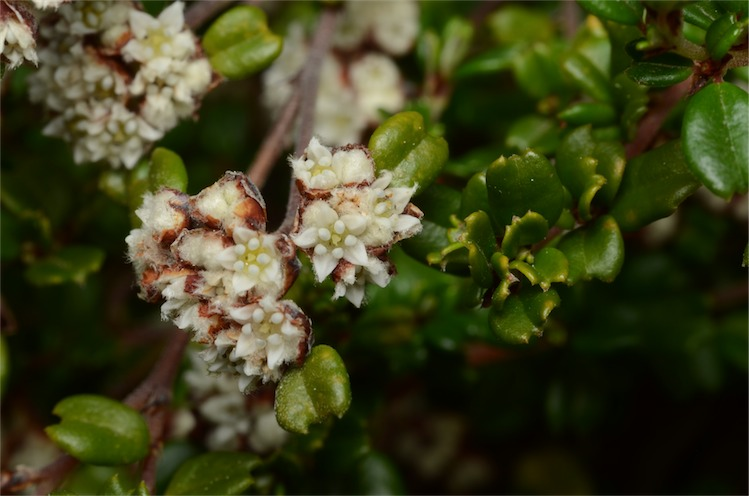
- In the Australian National Botanic Gardens

Conservation status
- Vulnerable (EPBC Act)

Scientific classification
- Kingdom: Plantae
- Clade: Tracheophytes
- Clade: Angiosperms
- Clade: Eudicots
- Clade: Rosids
- Order: Rosales
- Family: Rhamnaceae
- Genus: Spyridium
- Species: S. obcordatum

Binomial name
- Spyridium obcordatum (Hook.f.) W.M.Curtis

Synonyms
- Cryptandra obcordata Hook.f.; Spyridium serpillaceum F.Muell. orth. var.; Spyridium serpyllaceum (Reissek & F.Muell.) F.Muell. nom. illeg., nom. superfl.; Trymalium serpyllaceum Reissek & F.Muell.

= Spyridium obcordatum =

Species of shrub

Spyridium obcordatum, commonly known as creeping spyridium or creeping dustymiller, is a species of flowering plant in the family Rhamnaceae and is endemic to Tasmania. It is a prostrate shrub with heart-shaped leaves, the narrower end towards the base, and clusters of hairy, white flowers.

== Description ==
Spyridium obcordatum is a prostrate shrub that has many twiggy, wiry branches up to 40 cm (16 in) long. The leaves are egg-shaped to heart-shaped with the narrower end towards the base, mostly 4–10 mm (0.16–0.39 in) long with the edges curved downwards. The upper surface of the leaves is more or less glabrous and the lower surface is covered with greyish or white hairs. Heads of flowers are arranged on the ends of branchlets, surrounded by brown bracts and petal-like leaves, the individual flowers white and about 3 mm (0.12 in) wide. Flowering occurs from mid-September to October.

== Taxonomy ==
This species was first formally described in 1855 by Joseph Dalton Hooker who gave it the name Cryptandra obcordata in The botany of the Antarctic voyage of H.M. Discovery ships Erebus and Terror from specimens collected by Ronald Campbell Gunn. In 1970, Winifred Curtis changed the name to Spyridium obcordatum in The Victorian Naturalist. The specific epithet (obcordatum) means "heart-shaped, attached at the pointed end".

== Distribution and habitat ==
Spyridium obcordatum grows in open forest or woodland, mainly among serpentinite outcrops, near Beaconsfield and in near-coastal areas between Greens Beach and Hawley Beach in Tasmania.

== Conservation status ==
This species of spyridium is listed as "vulnerable" under the Australian Government Environment Protection and Biodiversity Conservation Act 1999 and the Tasmanian Government Threatened Species Protection Act 1995. The main threats to the species include habitat disturbance, browsing and grazing, and residential activity.
