= Loira (disambiguation) =

Loira or Lòira is an alternative spelling of Loire, a river in France.

Loira may also refer to:

- Loira, Galiza, one of the Rivers of Galicia in Spain
- Loira, Tasmania, a locality in Tasmania, Australia
- Loira, Valdoviño, a parroquia in Valdoviño, Spain
