= Wesley Vale =

Wesley Vale Tasmania
- Coordinates: 41°11′06″S 146°26′37″E
- Population: 483 (SAL 2021)
- Postcode(s): 7307
- Location: 10 km (6 mi) E of Devonport
- LGA(s): Latrobe Council
- State electorate(s): Braddon
- Federal division(s): Braddon
Localities around Wesley Vale:
Bass Strait	Bass Strait	Northdown
East Devonport	Wesley Vale	Moriarty
Latrobe	Latrobe	Moriarty

Wesley Vale is a locality and town in the local government area of Latrobe on the north west coast of Tasmania, Australia. It is located approximately 10 km (6.2 mi) east of Devonport, and 10 km (6.2 mi) west of Port Sorell.

Wesley Vale has a primary school, Andrews Creek Primary School, which stands on the site of the former Wesley Vale Primary School, established in 1899.

== History ==
In the post-war period, the Tasmanian Housing Department undertook large-scale residential development to address housing shortages. Pardoe Downs, within the boundaries of Wesley Vale, was one of the major subdivisions built in Devonport during the 1950s and 1960s, alongside similar estates in Hobart, Launceston, George Town and Burnie. The locality was gazetted in 1962.

The 2016 census determined a population of 443 for the state suburb of Wesley Vale. At the 2021 census, the population had increased to 483.

== Geography ==
The waters of Bass Strait form the northern boundary. The locality contains a mix of farmland, residential areas, and aviation infrastructure.

== Aviation ==
The northern section of Wesley Vale contains Devonport Airport, originally known as the Pardoe Downs Aerodrome. It was officially opened in November 1950 by the Minister for Air, Arthur Drakeford, in a ceremony attended by Dame Enid Lyons. More than 10,000 people attended the opening, where it was announced that £140,000 had been spent on the facility, with further works planned to make it one of the most modern airports in Australia.

Devonport Airport continues to serve north-west Tasmania, providing regular commercial passenger services across Bass Strait and supporting general aviation.

== Road infrastructure ==
The B74 route (Port Sorell Road) forms part of the western boundary before turning east and crossing the locality. Route B71 (Frankford Road) starts at an intersection with B74 on the south-western boundary and runs through from south-west to south-east. Route C701 (Pardoe Road / Mill Road) starts at an intersection with B74 on the western boundary, running north-east, east, and south before returning to B74 in the eastern part of the locality. A second section of C701 (Wesley Vale Road) starts from near the end of the first section and runs south, crossing B71 and ending at C702 just inside the southern boundary.
