= Merseylea, Tasmania =

Merseylea Tasmania
- Coordinates: 41°22′10″S 146°28′22″E
- Population: 56 (2016 census)
- Postcode(s): 7305
- Location: 29 km (18 mi) SE of Devonport
- LGA(s): Kentish, Latrobe
- Region: North West
- State electorate(s): Lyons, Braddon
- Federal division(s): Lyons, Braddon
Localities around Merseylea:
Railton	Railton	Sassafras
Sunnyside	Merseylea	Sassafras
Sunnyside	Kimberley	Elizabeth Town

Merseylea is a locality and small rural community in the local government areas of Kentish and Latrobe in the North West region of Tasmania. It is located about 29 kilometres (18 mi) south-east of the town of Devonport. The 2016 census determined a population of 56 for the state suburb of Merseylea.

== History ==
Merseylea was gazetted as a locality in 1965.

== Geography ==
The Mersey River forms the south-eastern boundary before flowing through to the north-west where it forms part of the north-western boundary. The Western Rail Line runs through from south to north-west.

== Road infrastructure ==
The B13 route (Railton Road) passes along the south-west boundary and through the southern end of the locality. Route C154 (Merseylea Road) starts at an intersection with B13 and runs through from south-west to north. Route C156 (Bridle Track Road) starts at an intersection with B13 and immediately exits to the south-west.
