= Gardiner Island =

Gardiner Island may refer to:

- Gardiner Island (Nunavut), Canada
- Gardiners Island, New York, USA

== See also ==
- Garden Island (disambiguation)
- Gardner Island
