= Batman Highway =

Highway in Tasmania, Australia

Batman Highway Tasmania

General information
- Type: Highway
- Length: 11.1 km (6.9 mi)
- Opened: 1968
- Route number(s): B73; Sidmouth — Hillwood

Major junctions
- West end: West Tamar Highway; Sidmouth, Tasmania
- East end: East Tamar Highway; Hillwood, Tasmania

Highway system
- Highways in Australia; National Highway • Freeways in Australia; Highways in Tasmania

Batman Highway is a two-lane rural highway in northern Tasmania. The highway links the East Tamar and West Tamar Highways via the Batman Bridge and provides the only crossing of the Tamar River north of the city of Launceston. The highway also serves traffic from the West Tamar area to the port of Bell Bay.

== See also ==
- Highways in Australia
- List of highways in Tasmania
