= Robigana, Tasmania =

Robigana Tasmania
- Coordinates: 41°15′49″S 146°56′27″E
- Population: 111 (2016 census)
- Postcode(s): 7275
- Location: 20 km (12 mi) SE of Beaconsfield
- LGA(s): West Tamar
- Region: Launceston
- State electorate(s): Bass
- Federal division(s): Bass
Localities around Robigana:
Deviot	Tamar River, Deviot	Swan Point
Loira	Robigana	Swan Point
Loira	Loira, Exeter	Gravelly Beach

Robigana is a rural locality in the local government area (LGA) of West Tamar in the Launceston LGA region of Tasmania. The locality is about 20 kilometres (12 mi) south-east of the town of Beaconsfield. The 2016 census recorded a population of 111 for the state suburb of Robigana.

== History ==
Robigana was gazetted as a locality in 1966. The name was in use by 1914. It is believed to be an Aboriginal word for “swan”.

== Geography ==
The waters of the Tamar River Estuary form part of the northern boundary.

== Road infrastructure ==
Route C728 (Deviot Road) passes through from south-east to north.
