= Winkleigh, Tasmania =

Winkleigh Tasmania
- Coordinates: 41°17′29″S 146°50′32″E
- Population: 203 (2016 census)
- Postcode(s): 7275
- Location: 43 km (27 mi) NW of Launceston
- LGA(s): West Tamar
- Region: Launceston
- State electorate(s): Bass
- Federal division(s): Bass
Localities around Winkleigh:
Holwell	Flowery Gully	Sidmouth, Loira
Holwell	Winkleigh	Exeter
Frankford	Glengarry	Exeter

Winkleigh is a rural locality in the local government area of West Tamar in the Launceston region of Tasmania. It is located about 43 kilometres (27 mi) north-west of the town of Launceston. The 2016 census determined a population of 203 for the state suburb of Winkleigh.

== History ==
The name has been in use for the area since 1870. Winkleigh was gazetted as a locality in 1966.

== Geography ==
The Supply River forms part of the southern boundary, and then flows through to form a small section of the eastern boundary.

== Road infrastructure ==
The C717 route (Winkleigh Road / Flowery Gully Road) enters from the south-east and runs through to the north-west where it exits. Route C718 (Glengarry Road) starts from an intersection with C717 and runs south-west before exiting. Route C716 (Nettlefolds Road) passes through the south-west corner from south to north-west.
