= Carbuncle =

Carbuncle may refer to:

- Carbuncle (gemstone), a deep-red cabochon cut gemstone usually garnet, specifically almandine
- Carbuncle (heraldry), a charge or bearing, consisting of eight radii, or spokes; four of which make a common cross, and the other four a saltire
- Carbuncle (legendary creature), in South American folklore, associated with gemstones
- Carbuncle (pathology), an abscess larger than a boil, usually with one or more openings draining pus onto the skin
- The Carbuncle, a small island off Port Sorell, Tasmania, Australia

== See also ==
- Carbuncle Hill Archaeological District, RI-1072-1079, a historic district in Coventry, Rhode Island
- "The Adventure of the Blue Carbuncle", a Sherlock Holmes short story by Sir Arthur Conan Doyle
- The Carbuncle Awards, presented to buildings and areas in Scotland intermittently since 2000
- Carbuncle Cup, an annual architectural award for the ugliest new building in the UK
- "The Great Carbuncle", a short story by Nathaniel Hawthorne
- Monstrous carbuncle, a pejorative term coined by Charles III for ugly architecture
