= York Town, Tasmania =

York Town
- Coordinates: 41°9′S 146°46′E
- Country: Australia
- State: Tasmania
- Region: Launceston, North-west and west
- LGA: West Tamar, Latrobe
- Location: 7 km (4.3 mi) NW of Beaconsfield

Government
  - State electorate: Bass, Braddon
  - Federal division: Bass, Braddon

Population
  - Total: 78 (SAL 2021)
Localities around York Town
Bakers Beach	Badger Head	Clarence Point
Bakers Beach	York Town	Tamar River, Beauty Point
Beaconsfield	Beaconsfield	Beaconsfield

York Town is a rural locality in the local government areas (LGA) of West Tamar and Latrobe in the Launceston and North-west and west LGA regions of Tasmania. The locality is about 7 kilometres (4.3 mi) north-west of the town of Beaconsfield. It was the first attempt to establish a British presence in northern Tasmania, in 1804. It was a "bustling village" until 1808.

== History ==
York Town was gazetted as a locality in 1967.

All the original buildings have now gone, but the landscape and natural setting remain largely unchanged. The site is preserved as the York Town Historic Site and provided with interpretive signage.

Extensive deposits of rich iron ore were discovered in the nearby hills by the settlers during the time of the York Town settlement. Later - in the 1870s - these iron deposits led to the establishment of a short-lived iron mining and smelting industry on the western side of the Tamar estuary at Redbill Point and at Ilfracombe (now known as Beauty Point).

The 2016 census had a population of 72 for the state suburb of York Town. At the 2021 census, the population had increased to 78.

== Geography ==
The waters of the west arm of the Tamar River estuary form most of the eastern boundary.

== Road infrastructure ==
Greens Beach Road (Route A7) passes through from south-east to north-east. Route C741 (Bowens Road) starts at an intersection with A7 and runs south-west until it exits.
