= Garden Island (Huon River) =

Island in Tasmania, Australia

Coordinates: 43°15′S 147°07′E

Garden Island is a small stony island that is part of the Partridge Island Group, lying close to the south-eastern coast of Tasmania, Australia, in the D'Entrecasteaux Channel between Bruny Island and the mainland. The D'Entrecasteaux Channel is the mouth for the Huon River.

Green Island in the Tamar River was also renamed as Garden Island, and other islands sometimes called "Garden Island" include Smooth Island and one of the islands within the Great Lake. The island at the mouth of the Huon River was named "Gardners Island" by the Rev R. Knopwood in 1804, and had that name in maps in 1832. At that time, a "Garden Island" or "Smooth Island" appeared on maps at the entrance of Norfolk Bay.

== Flora and fauna ==
Much of the island is covered with eucalypt forest.
