= Narawntapu National Park =

National park in Tasmania, Australia

- IUCN category II (national park)
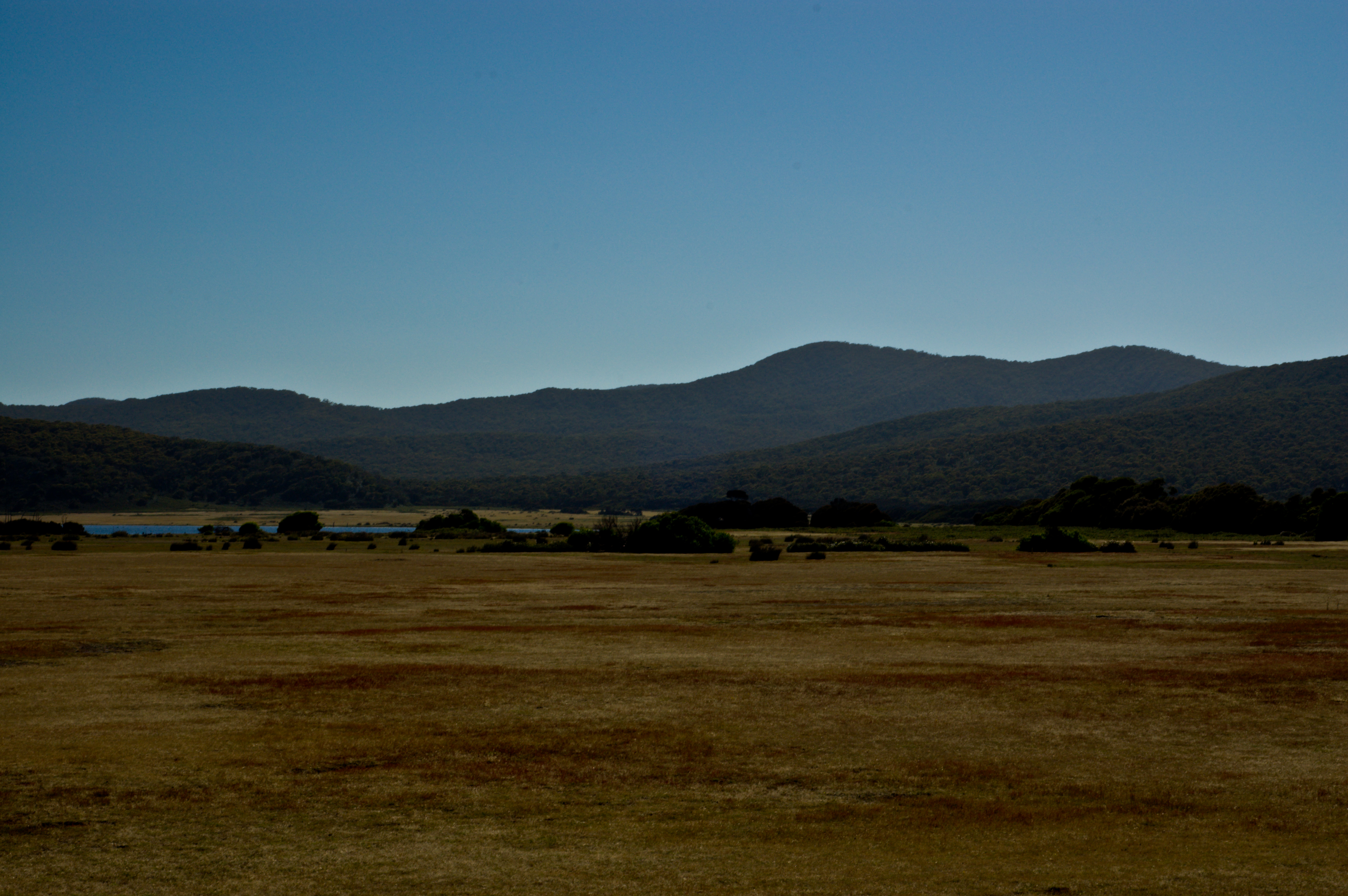
- Narawntapu National Park, December 2009

- Location within Tasmania
- Location: Tasmania
- Nearest city: Port Sorell
- Coordinates: 41°07′58″S 146°39′24″E
- Area: 43.49 km^{2} (16.79 sq mi)
- Established: 1976
- Visitors: 10100 (in 1996/97)
- Governing body: Tasmania Parks and Wildlife Service
- Website: Official website

Narawntapu National Park (formerly known as Asbestos Range National Park) is a national park in the Australian state of Tasmania. It lies on Tasmania's north coast, adjoining Bass Strait, between Port Sorell in the west and the mouth of the Tamar River in the east. It lies about 20 km east of Devonport, 60 km north-west of Launceston and 250 km north of Hobart.

Narawntapu encompasses islands in the Port Sorell estuary and the Carbuncle, as well as land extending to low water mark, including intertidal mudflats. The highest point of the park is 392 m ASL. It is listed on Australia's Register of the National Estate.

Narawntapu is popular with visitors, with many coming from the tourist centres of Devonport and Port Sorell. The visitor centre is located in an area known as Springlawn, where visitors can see Forester kangaroos, Bennett's wallabies, Tasmanian pademelons grazing in the open plain.

== History ==
The park was originally reserved, as the Asbestos Range National Park, on 29 June 1976. The name was changed to Narawntapu in 2000 because of concerns that the word 'Asbestos' was deterring potential visitors. 'Narawntapu' is of Tasmanian Aboriginal origin, referring to the coastal promontories West Head and Badger Head within the park.

== Climate ==
Narawntapu has a temperate maritime climate with an annual, mainly winter, rainfall of 750 mm. The prevailing winds are from the north-east and north-west. Mean temperatures are 17°C in January and 9°C in July.

== Flora and fauna ==
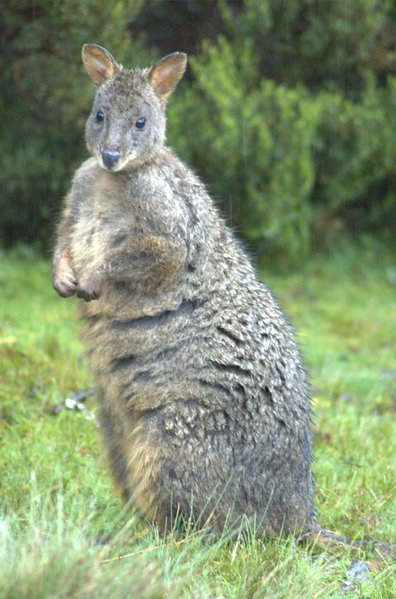
Tasmanian pademelon in Narawntapu.

Vegetation communities represented in the park include coastal heathland, dry sclerophyll woodland, herbland, grassland and salt marsh. The rare pygmy clubmoss has been recorded from the park.

A feature of the park is the high density of marsupials present. In addition to kangaroos, wallabies and pademelons, one can find also common wombats and Tasmanian devils. Eastern and spotted-tail quolls live in the area, as well as platypuses and echidnas. The birdlife is rich and includes threatened species such as the hooded plover, Tasmanian wedge-tailed eagle and swift parrot. The intertidal mudflats in the North East Arm area of the park are an important foraging area for migratory waders, and form part of the Rubicon Estuary Important Bird Area, identified as such by BirdLife International because of their importance for pied oystercatchers.

There is also a rich diversity of birdlife in the land surrounding the wetlands. At certain times of the year, several species of ducks, as well as herons, swans, cormorants, coots, bitterns and grebes call the lagoon home.

In 2019, the population of wombats had been reduced to between 3 and 10 individuals following an outbreak of mange that began in 2010. Scientists implemented a drench technique at burrow entrances to treat the animals. The treatment contained the disease for a short while but ultimately all of the mange-infected wombats died.

== See also ==
- Protected areas of Tasmania
