= Sidmouth, Tasmania =

Sidmouth Tasmania
- Coordinates: 41°13′55″S 146°52′45″E
- Population: 394 (2016 census)
- Postcode(s): 7270
- Location: 35 km (22 mi) NW of Launceston
- LGA(s): West Tamar
- Region: Western Tamar Valley
- State electorate(s): Bass
- Federal division(s): Bass
Localities around Sidmouth:
Beaconsfield	Kayena	Tamar River
Flowery Gully	Sidmouth	Deviot
Winkleigh	Loira	Loira

Sidmouth is a locality and small rural community in the local government area of West Tamar, in the Western Tamar Valley region of Tasmania. It is located about 35 kilometres (22 mi) north-west of the town of Launceston. The Tamar River forms the north-eastern boundary. The 2016 census determined a population of 394 for the state suburb of Sidmouth.

== History ==
The locality name may have been derived from Sidmouth, a town in Devon, England.

== Road infrastructure ==
The B73 route (Batman Highway) runs from the East Tamar Highway over the Batman Bridge, entering the locality in the east and passing through to intersect with the West Tamar Highway, which passes through from south-east to north-west, in the centre. The C725 route (Spring Hill Road) runs between the Batman Highway and the West Tamar Highway to provide a shorter way for northbound traffic from the Batman Bridge.
