= Sassafras, Tasmania =

Sassafras Tasmania
- Coordinates: 41°16′54″S 146°29′09″E
- Population: 347 (2016 census)
- Postcode(s): 7307
- Location: 20 km (12 mi) SE of Devonport
- LGA(s): Latrobe, Meander Valley
- Region: Launceston, North-west and west
- State electorate(s): Braddon, Lyons
- Federal division(s): Braddon, Lyons
Localities around Sassafras:
Latrobe	Thirlstane	Harford
Acacia Hills	Sassafras	Frankford
Railton	Merseylea	Parkham

Sassafras is a locality and small rural community in the local government areas of Latrobe and Meander Valley, in the Launceston and North-west and west regions of Tasmania. It is located about 20 kilometres (12 mi) inland from the town of Devonport. The Mersey River forms part of its western boundary, and the Bass Highway passes through from south to north-west. The 2016 census determined a population of 347 for the state suburb of Sassafras.

== History ==
European settlement came to the Sassafras district in the 1850s. The land was covered by almost impervious scrub, and it had to be cleared before farming could begin. An interdenominational chapel was built for Henry Rockliff and opened by Rev. Isaac Rooney on 1 January 1865. It was built on his own property, Skelbrook. A Wesleyan Church was opened in 1876 near there. Schooling was first conducted in a "hut", then in the chapel. The first public school was either opened in 1871 or five years after 1865. The area during this time had a blacksmith, wheelwright, bootmaker, flour mill, butcher, post office and police station. The property of Skelbrook is still owned by the Rockliff family (as of 2018) and produces potatoes, poppies, beans, peas, broad beans, baby carrots and wheat.

== Notable landmarks ==
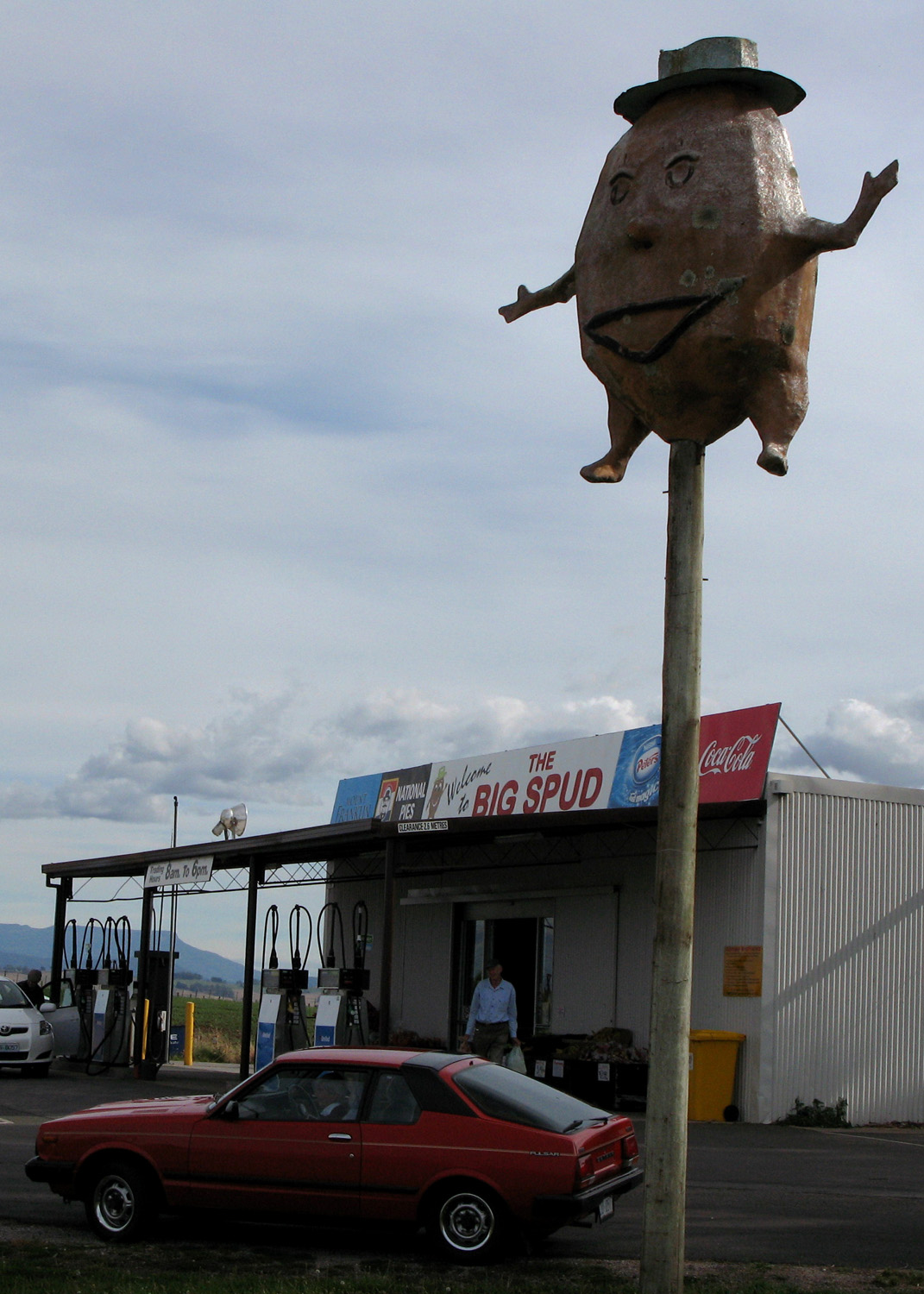
The Big Spud

- Kenny Kennebec, "The Big Spud"
- Sassafras Baptist Church
- Nichols Poultry

== Road infrastructure ==
Four shielded minor roads terminate at the Bass Highway in Sassafras. The C153 route (Native Plains Road) runs south from the north-western end to Railton. The C704 route (Oppenheims Road) runs north and east from the northern extremity to Harford, and from there provides access to many localities, including Port Sorell. The C706 route (East Sassafras Road) runs east within Sassafras and then north to Harford, while the C713 route (Chapel Road) runs north from the centre to Harford.

== Notable people ==
- Arthur Cutts, Australian politician
- George Pullen, Australian politician
- Jeremy Rockliff, Australian politician
- Thornton Rockliffe, Australian cricketer
- Michael Adye Smith, Australian politician

== See also ==
- Atherosperma, commonly known as the southern sassafrases, are a family of broadleaf evergreen trees and shrubs of the Southern Hemisphere, including Tasmania.
- Other articles with references by K.R. von Stieglitz (compiler of A Short History on Latrobe with notes on Port Sorell and Sassafras)
  - Carrick, Tasmania
  - Exton, Tasmania
  - Hagley, Tasmania
  - Meander River (Tasmania)
  - Michael Howe (bushranger)
  - Westbury, Tasmania
