= House of Anvers =

Australian chocolate company

House of Anvers is a chocolatier company in Latrobe, Tasmania, Australia. It was founded in 1989, by Igor van Gerwen, a Belgian-born chocolatier. It moved into its present location on the Bass Highway in 2002, in the historic Wyndarra Lodge. House of Anvers is the only Australian stockist of Fortunato No. 4, Nacional cocoa chocolate.

House of Anvers sells its chocolate in independent chocolate shops and IGA supermarkets, as well as at a purpose built store in Latrobe and chocolate themed restaurant. It is also a sponsor and host of Latrobe Chocolate Winterfest annually. House of Anvers are the favourite chocolates of the Belgium ambassador to Australia, Marc Mullie. House of Anvers was the first location to offer an electric vehicle charging point in Northern Tasmania.

in 2023, van Gerwen's book Chocolatier, which chronicles the foundation of Anvers, was awarded best chocolate book at the Gourmand International Cookbook Awards in Saudi Arabia.
