= Loira, Tasmania =

Loira
- Town
- Coordinates: 41°16′01″S 146°53′57″E
- Country: Australia
- State: Tasmania
- Region: Western Tamar Valley
- LGA: West Tamar
- Location: 31 km (19 mi) NW of Launceston

Government
  - State electorate: Bass
  - Federal division: Bass

Population
  - Total: 160 (2016 census)
- Postcode: 7275
Localities around Loira
Sidmouth	Sidmouth	Deviot
Winkleigh	Loira	Robigana
Winkleigh	Exeter	Exeter

Loira is a locality and small rural community in the local government area of West Tamar, in the Western Tamar Valley region of Tasmania. It is located about 31 kilometres (19 mi) north-west of the town of Launceston. The Supply River forms the southern and part of the eastern boundaries. The 2016 census determined a population of 160 for the state suburb of Loira.

== History ==
Originally known as "Port Station", the locality name is derived from an Aboriginal word meaning "charcoal reduced to powder".

== Road infrastructure ==
The C729 route (Motor Road) intersects with the West Tamar Highway, which passes through the locality from south-east to north-west. It runs north-east through the locality to Deviot.
