= Deviot Sailing Club =

Sailing club in Tasmania, Australia

The Deviot Sailing Club is situated halfway between Launceston and Low Head on the Tamar River. The club rooms are on the west side of the river just south of the Batman Bridge.
