= Clarence Point =

Clarence Point Tasmania
- Coordinates: 41°7′47″S 146°48′28″E
- Population: 226 (2016)
- Postcode(s): 7270
- Elevation: 29.9 m (98 ft)
- Location: 3.1 km (2 mi) SW of George Town; 53 km (33 mi) N of Launceston; 54 km (34 mi) E of Devonport
- LGA(s): West Tamar
- State electorate(s): Bass
- Federal division(s): Bass
Localities around Clarence Point:
Kelso	Kelso	Tamar River
Kelso, Badger Head	Clarence Point	Tamar River
York Town	Tamar River	Tamar River

Clarence Point is a locality in northern Tasmania about 3 kilometres (2 mi) southwest of George Town across the Tamar River. Most of its population is settled along the riverbank. Clarence Point is also the name of the regional area that includes the village, which is part of the West Tamar Municipal Area. In the 2016 census, Clarence Point had a population of 226, with a median age of 56.

== History ==
The area was known as Lyetta until the late 1960s, but the name “Clarence Point” was in use in the vicinity from 1835, being applied to a shoreline feature (now Ashmans Point), a property (date unknown) and a housing estate (1911). Clarence Point was gazetted as a locality in 1967.

== Geography ==
The Tamar River forms the eastern, southern, and most of the northern boundaries.

== Road infrastructure ==
The A7 route (Greens Beach Road) runs through from south-West to north. Route C721 (Badger Head Road) starts at an intersection with A7 on the western boundary and runs away to the north-west. Route C722 (Clarence Point Road / Bevic Road) starts at an intersection with A7 in the south-west and runs north-east before turning north and then west, until it rejoins A7 on the northern boundary.

== Recreation ==
The Clarence Point jetty is a productive location for recreational fishing of a wide range of saltwater fish species. There are numerous other fishing spots within a short distance along the estuary, including Kelso and Garden Island.
