= Kelso, Tasmania =

Kelso
- Town
- Coordinates: 41°6′20″S 146°47′0″E
- Country: Australia
- State: Tasmania
- Region: Launceston
- LGA: West Tamar
- Location: 2.5 km (1.6 mi) W of George Town; 55 km (34 mi) N of Launceston; 61 km (38 mi) E of Devonport; 14 km (8.7 mi) N of Beaconsfield

Government
  - State electorate: Bass
  - Federal division: Bass
- Elevation: 8.7 m (29 ft)

Population
  - Total: 146 (2016 census)
- Postcode: 7270
Localities around Kelso
Greens Beach	Bass Strait	Tamar River
Greens Beach	Kelso	Tamar River
Greens Beach	Clarence Point, Badger Head	Clarence Point

Kelso is a rural locality in the local government area (LGA) of West Tamar in the Launceston LGA region of Tasmania. The locality is about 14 kilometres (8.7 mi) north of the town of Beaconsfield. The 2016 census recorded a population of 146 for the state suburb of Kelso. It is located west of George Town. It was settled in the early 19th century and is located on Kelso Bay, a small bay on the Tamar River. Kelso is known as a fishing resort for flathead, whiting and mullet. Kelso is also located near the Narawntapu National Park.

== History ==
The area was originally known as Kelsalls Bay or Kelsalls Point after William Kelsall, the first European inhabitant of the district, who arrived in 1804. It is believed that the name is a derivative of “Kelsall”. Kelso is also a town in Scotland, and that could be the source of the name. Friend Point, on the north-east corner of the locality, is believed to be named for Lieutenant Matthew Friend, a former Royal Navy officer who held various positions in northern Tasmania from 1832. Kelso was gazetted as a locality in 1967.

A receiving office opened in 1900 and converted to a post office about 1922. It closed in 1973.

== Geography ==
The waters of Bass Strait and the Tamar River estuary form the northern, north-eastern, and eastern boundaries. Kelso Bay is a small, shallow inlet on the east coast of the locality.

== Road infrastructure ==
Route A7 (Greens Beach Road) passes through from south-east to west.
