= Hawley Beach =

- Town
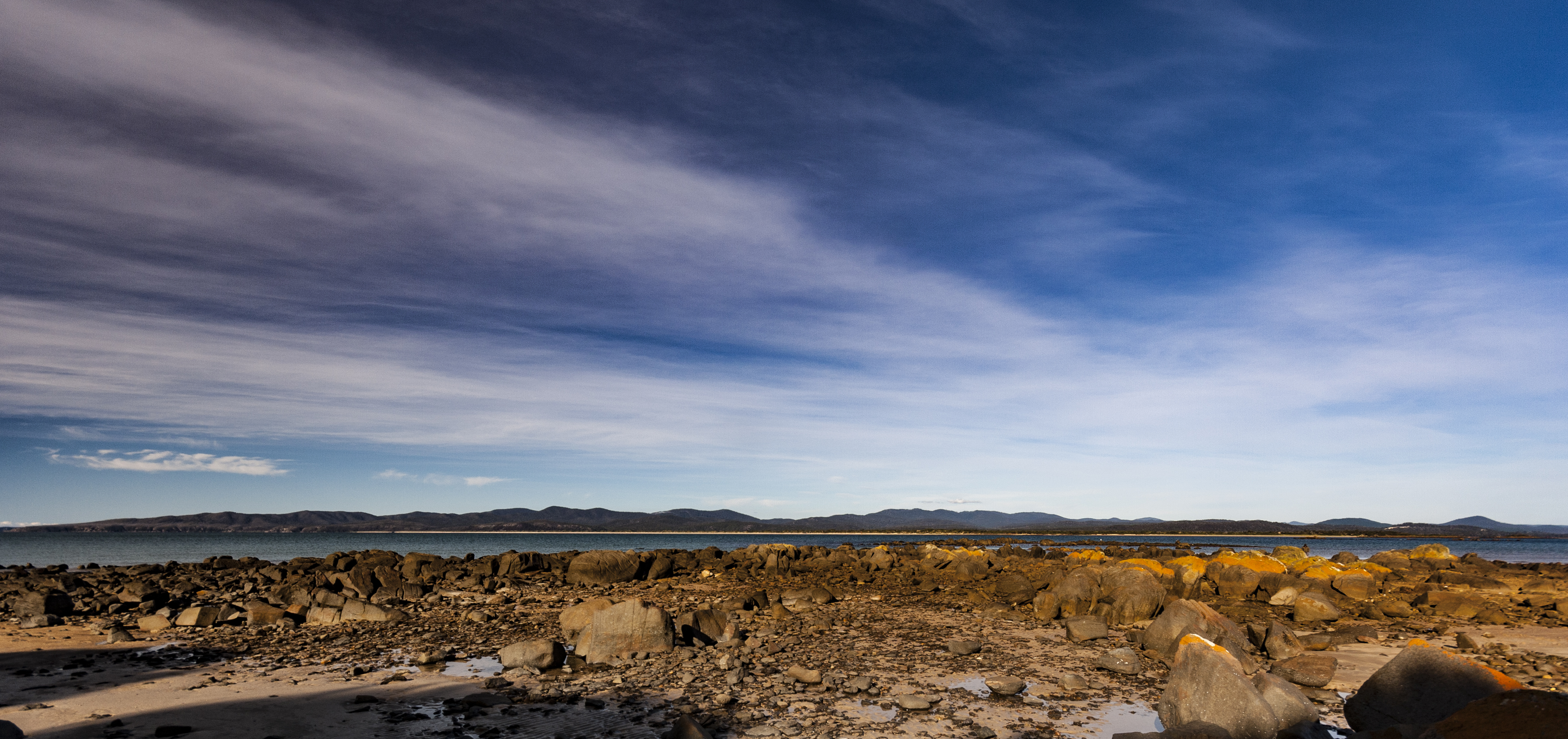
- Hawley in 2016

- Coordinates: 41°8′31.34″S 146°32′15.72″E
- Country: Australia
- State: Tasmania
- Region: North-west and west
- LGA: Latrobe
- Location: 256 km (159 mi) N of Hobart; 22 km (14 mi) E of Devonport; 4 km (2.5 mi) N of Port Sorell; 22 km (14 mi) NE of Latrobe

Government
  - State electorate: Braddon
  - Federal division: Braddon

Population
  - Total: 484 (2016 census)
- Postcode: 7307
Localities around Hawley Beach
Bass Strait	Bass Strait	Bass Strait
Bass Strait, Northdown	Hawley Beach	Bass Strait
Northdown	Shearwater	Bass Strait

Hawley Beach is a rural and residential locality in the local government area (LGA) of Latrobe in the north-west and west region of Tasmania. The locality is about 22 kilometres (14 mi) north-east of the town of Latrobe. The 2016 census recorded a population of 484 for the state suburb of Hawley Beach. It is a locality and seaside resort town 22 kilometres (14 mi) from the nearest main town (Devonport). Nearby is the small town of Port Sorell and locality of Shearwater.

Hawley Beach is known for its minute red sand crabs, hooded plovers and reasonable fishing. It borders the Rubicon Estuary, which has been identified by BirdLife International as an Important Bird Area because of its importance for waders, especially pied oystercatchers.

== History ==
Hawley Beach Post Office opened on 2 November 1965 and closed in 1992. Hawley Beach was gazetted as a locality in 1955.

== Geography ==
The waters of Bass Strait form part of the western boundary, and all of the northern and eastern boundaries.

== Road infrastructure ==
Route C708 (Alexander Street) provides access to the locality, terminating at the southern boundary.
