= Jack Badcock =

Australian cricketer (1914–1982)

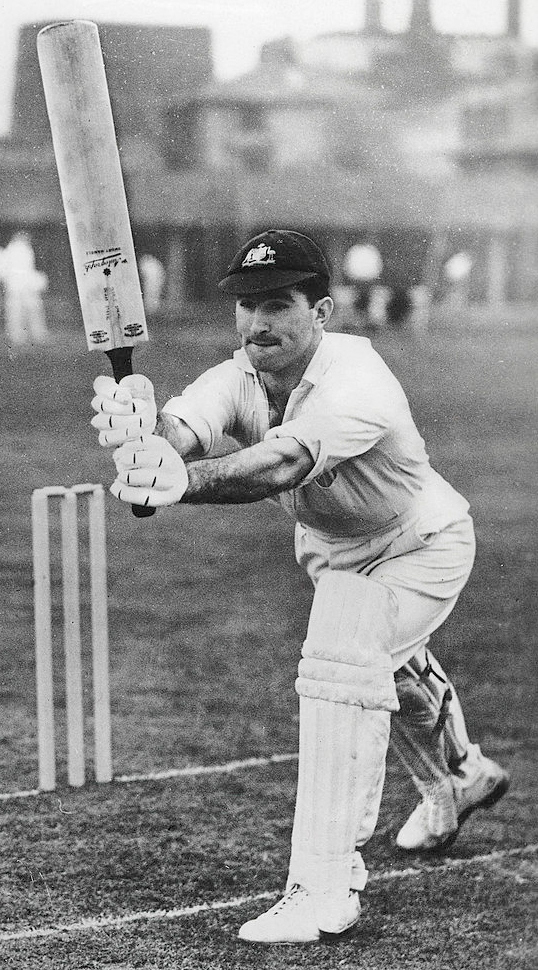

Personal information
- Full name: Clayvel Lindsay Badcock
- Born: 10 April 1914; Exton, Tasmania
- Died: 13 December 1982 (aged 68); Exton, Tasmania
- Batting: Right-handed

International information
- National side: Australia (1936–1938)
- Test debut (cap 155): 4 December 1936 v England
- Last Test: 20 August 1938 v England

Domestic team information
- Years: Team
- 1929–30 to 1933–34: Tasmania
- 1934–35 to 1940–41: South Australia

Career statistics
| Competition | Tests | First-class |
|---|---|---|
| Matches | 7 | 97 |
| Runs scored | 160 | 7,561 |
| Batting average | 14.54 | 51.54 |
| 100s/50s | 1/0 | 26/21 |
| Top score | 118 | 325 |
| Balls bowled | 0 | 38 |
| Wickets | 0 | 0 |
| Bowling average | – | – |
| 5 wickets in innings | 0 | 0 |
| 10 wickets in match | 0 | 0 |
| Best bowling | – | – |
| Catches/stumpings | 3/0 | 41/0 |

Clayvel Lindsay "Jack" Badcock (10 April 1914 – 13 December 1982) was an Australian cricketer who played in seven Tests from 1936 to 1938.

== Early career in Tasmania ==
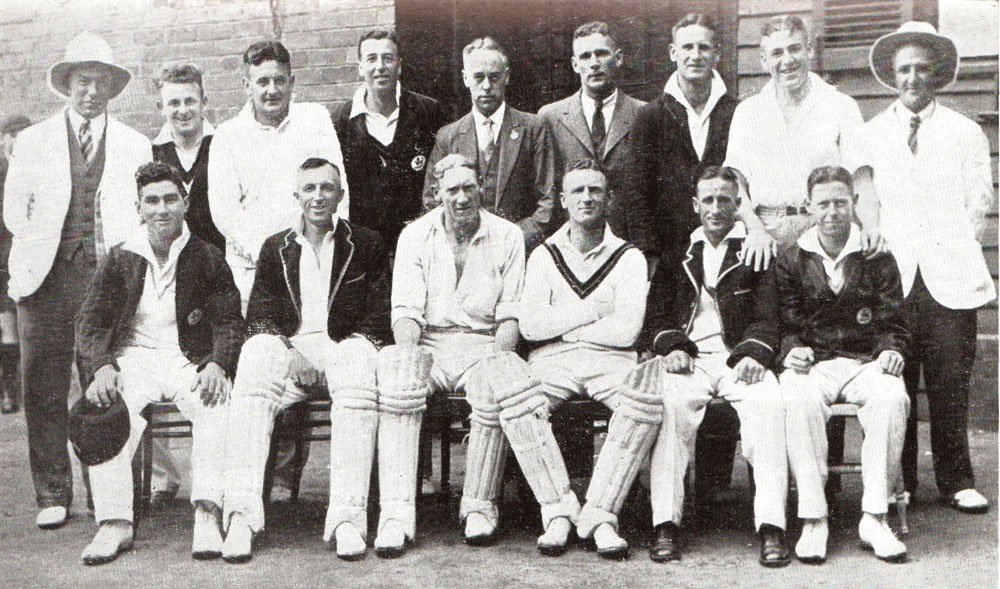
The Tasmanian team that played the South Africans at Hobart in January 1932. Jack Badcock is seated at left.

Born in Exton, in the north of Tasmania near Deloraine, Badcock was the second youngest player for Tasmania in first-class cricket, making his debut in 1929–30 at the age of 15. Opening the batting, he top-scored in each innings for Tasmania against the MCC at Launceston in 1932–33, making 57 and 43 not out.

In 1933–34 he played five first-class matches and scored 803 runs at 89.22. In three matches against Victoria he scored 25, 107, 274, 71 not out, 104 and 40, and in two matches against the Australians before their tour of England he scored 105, 24, 47 and 6. In all cricket that season he made 1970 runs at an average of 98.50. On the advice of Clarrie Grimmett he moved to Adelaide in June 1934, taking a job as a furniture salesman.

== For South Australia and the Australian Test team ==
In 1934–35, his first season for South Australia, he made 517 runs at 39.76, and in 1935–36 he made 694 at 86.75, including 325 in the last match of the season in an innings victory over Victoria.

He scored 167 for a Western Australia Combined XI against the MCC at the start of the 1936–37 season, and played in the First and Second Tests against England. However, he scored only 8 runs, Australia lost both matches, and he lost his place in the Test team. He returned to form with 136 and 27 not out against New South Wales in the Sheffield Shield and won back his Test place. The series was level two-all, and Australia needed to win to retain The Ashes, as the match was to be played to a finish regardless of time. Badcock batted at number five and scored 118, adding 161 for the fifth wicket with Ross Gregory. Australia won by an innings.

After making 872 runs at 51.29 with four centuries in 1937–38, Badcock toured England in 1938. He had considerable success in the first-class matches, scoring 1,604 runs at an average of 45.82 with four centuries and finishing as the third most successful batsman of the Australian team on the tour. However, in the four Tests he failed to reach double figures in any innings: an oddity of his Test career is that, having scored the one century in 1936–37, he was never, in 11 further Test innings, out in double figures.

From 1934 to 1939, Badcock had an endorsement deal with the Alexander Patent Racket Company in Launceston, Tasmania, to produce a range of 'Jack Badcock' cricket bats. He had already been using cricket bats made by Alexander during his early career in Tasmania.

He continued to score prolifically in Australia, including 271 not out for South Australia against New South Wales in 1938–39, and 236 against Queensland in 1939–40. Lumbago led to his retirement from cricket in 1941 and he returned to the family farm at Exton.

== Assessments ==
Donald Bradman described Badcock as "a lovable and completely unspoiled personality – a great cricketer whose failures in the Tests in England in 1938 detract somewhat from an otherwise splendid record". The Tasmanian cricket historian Roger Page described him as "short, thick-set, and possessing forearms that Longfellow's blacksmith might have envied ... his usual game was a slow start, risking nothing with length bowling before taking the attack ... his sound defence, ideal temperament, snappy footwork and keen sense of a loose delivery enabled him to crush most bowling".

== See also ==
- List of Tasmanian representative cricketers
- List of South Australian representative cricketers
