= Parkham, Tasmania =

Parkham
- Town
- Coordinates: 41°24′33″S 146°38′15″E
- Country: Australia
- State: Tasmania
- Region: Launceston, North-west and west
- LGA: Meander Valley, West Tamar, Latrobe
- Location: 24 km (15 mi) N of Deloraine

Government
  - State electorates: Braddon; Lyons
  - Federal divisions: Braddon; Lyons

Population
  - Total: 129 (2016 census)
- Postcode: 7304
Localities around Parkham
Sassafras	Sassafras	Frankford
Kimberley	Parkham	Reedy Marsh
Elizabeth Town	Weetah	Reedy Marsh

Parkham is a locality and small rural community in the local government areas of Meander Valley, West Tamar and Latrobe, in the Launceston and North-west and west regions of Tasmania. It is located about 24 kilometres (15 mi) north of the town of Deloraine. The 2016 census determined a population of 129 for the state suburb of Parkham.

== History ==
The name ”Parkham" was applied to a post station in the vicinity in 1886. It may be that this was named for Parkham in England.

== Road infrastructure ==
The C711 route (Parkham Road) runs north-east from the Bass Highway to the locality.
