= Thornton Rockliffe =

Australian cricketer

Personal information
- Born: 5 July 1887; Sassafras, Tasmania, Australia
- Died: 18 March 1961 (aged 73); Devonport, Tasmania, Australia

Domestic team information
- Years: Team
- 1909/10: Tasmania
- Source: Cricinfo, 20 January 2016

Thornton Rockliffe (5 July 1887 – 18 March 1961) was an Australian cricketer. He played one first-class match for Tasmania in 1909/10.

== See also ==
- List of Tasmanian representative cricketers
