= Batman Bridge =

Bridge in Tasmania, Australia

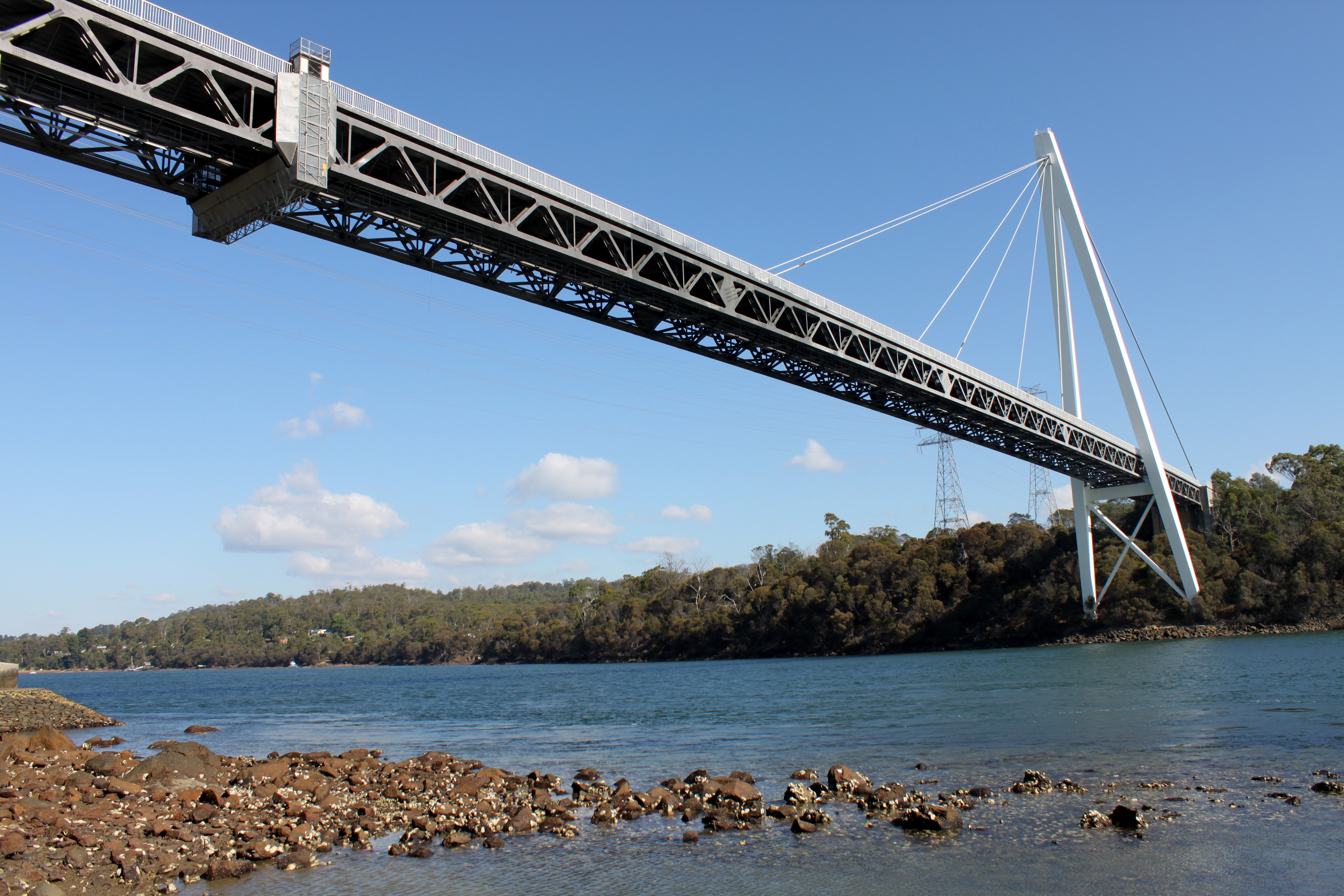
- Coordinates: 41°13′01″S 146°54′51″E
- Carries: Batman Highway
- Crosses: Tamar River
- Locale: Sidmouth, Tasmania, Australia

Characteristics
- Design: Cable-stayed
- Total length: 432 metres (1,417 ft)
- Width: 10.3 metres (34 ft)
- Height: 91 metres (299 ft)
- Longest span: 206 metres (676 ft)

History
- Opened: 18 May 1968

Statistics
- Daily traffic: 2,013

Location
- Interactive map of Batman Bridge

The Batman Bridge is a modern road bridge that carries the Batman Highway across the Tamar River, between Whirlpool Reach, Hillwood at its eastern end and Sidmouth / Deviot midpoint at its western end, in north Tasmania, Australia. The bridge connects the Batman Highway with the West Tamar Highway (route A7) and the East Tamar Highway (route A8). The bridge overlooks the Deviot Sailing Club and is named in honour of John Batman, a Launceston businessman and co-founder of Melbourne.

== Design features ==
Built between 1966 and 1968, it was the first cable-stayed bridge in Australia. The main span is 206 metres (676 ft) long, suspended from a 91-metre-high (299 ft) steel A-frame tower. The deck is 10.3 metres (34 ft) wide. The tower is on the west bank of the Tamar river, on a solid dolerite rock base which carries 78% of the weight of the main span. The length of the bridge is 432 metres (1,417 ft) between abutments. The east bank is soft clay not capable of supporting a bridge. A causeway carries the highway across this softer base, supported by four piers built on piles driven up to 18 metres (59 ft) into the clay. The bridge deck is constructed of steel.

== Gallery ==
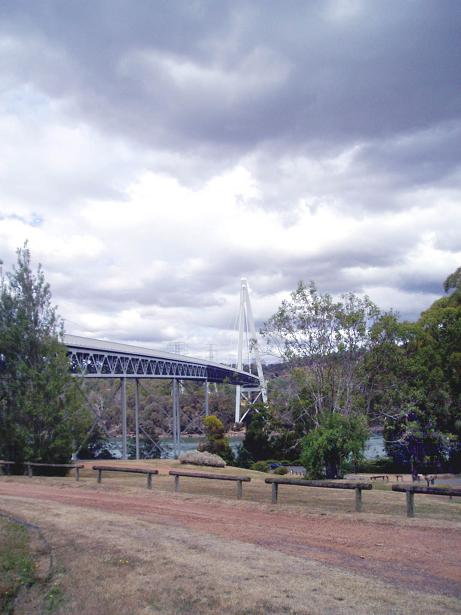
Batman Bridge, off Tamar Highway

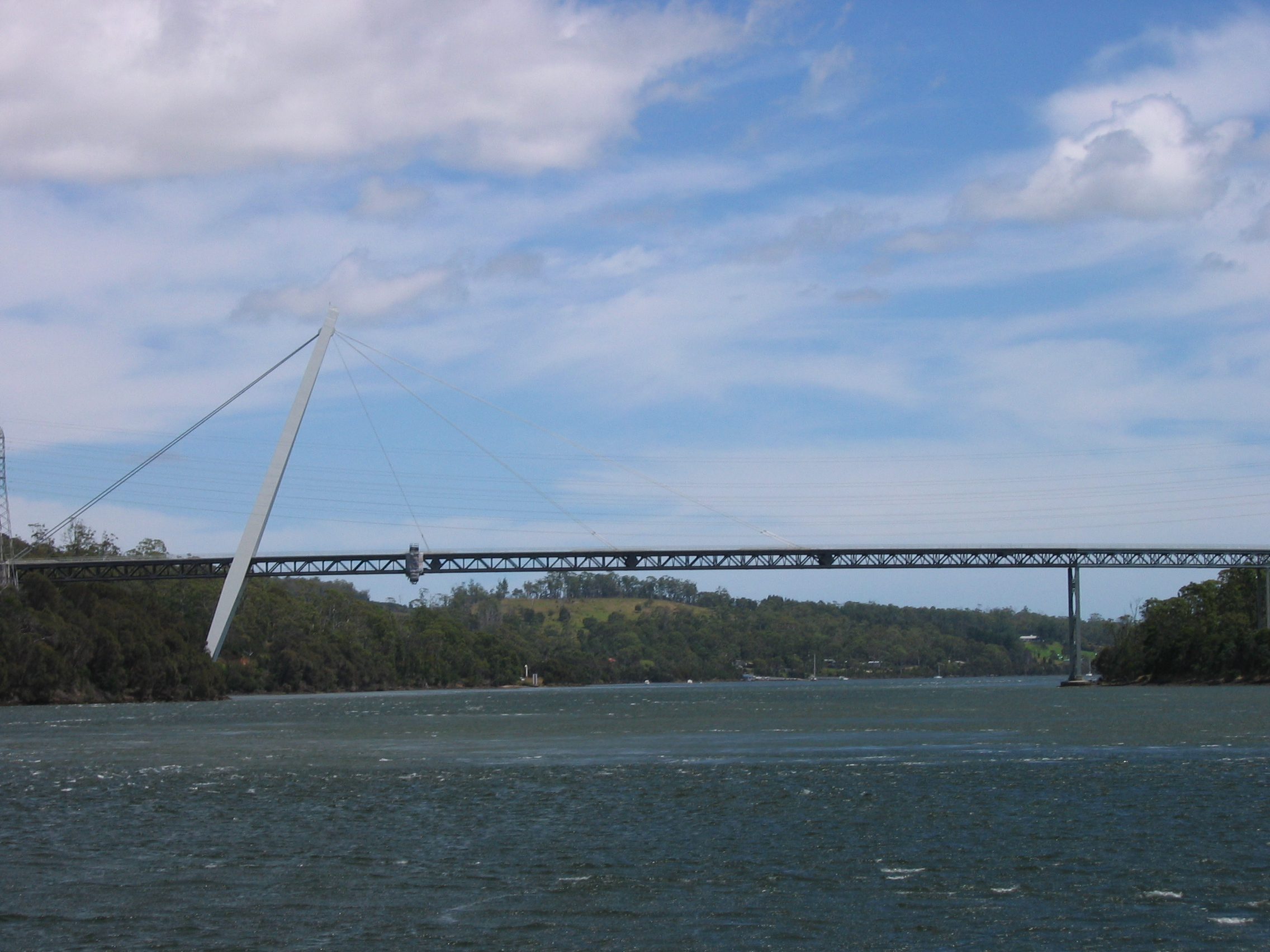
View of the bridge from the Tamar River

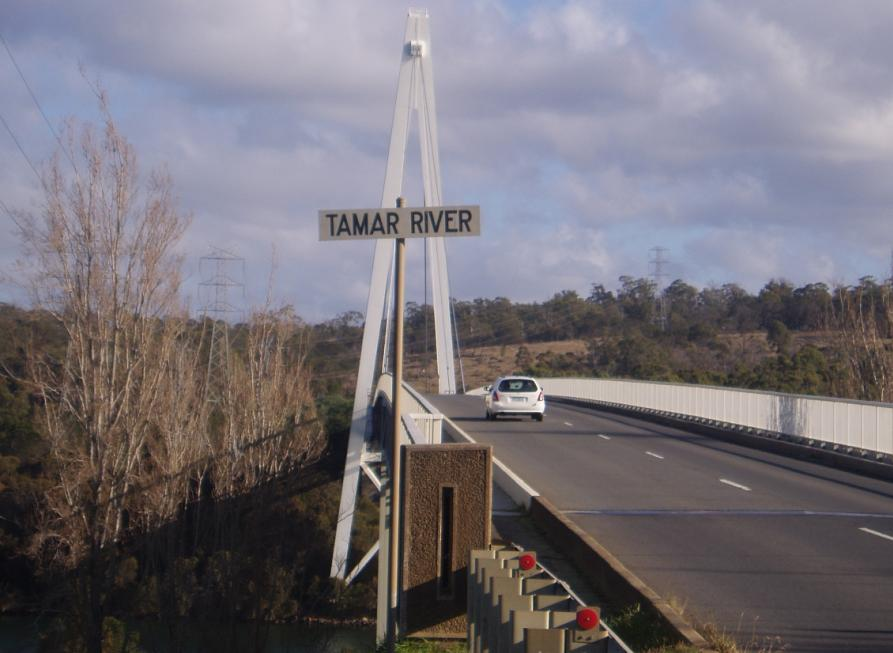
Tamar river batman bridge
