= Garden Island (Tamar River) =

Tied island

Coordinates: 41.114573°S 146.814311°E

Garden Island is a tied island 2 kilometres (1.2 mi) from Clarence Point, near the mouth of the Tamar River in Tasmania. It is accessed by a dirt road off Bevic Road, which runs between West Tamar Highway, Kelso and Clarence Point Road.

This large area is owned by TasPorts. Garden Island is surrounded on all sides by the Tamar River, an estuary which has been excavated to provide a channel for shipping. The backfill from this dredging was moved towards the shore, and provided easier access by connecting the island. There are no facilities of any type on the island, but it provides productive seawater fishing spots, and a flat and open scenic lookout. There are also plenty of oysters in the estuary, but toxic levels of copper, zinc and cadmium have been found in the oysters.

The island was known as Green Island in the early nineteenth century and was used for food storage by the settlement established by Colonel William Paterson in 1804.
