= Tamar River Bridge =

Proposed bridge in Launceston, Tasmania

- Screenshot of the proposed bridge
- Crosses: Tamar River
- Locale: Launceston, Tasmania, Australia
- Begins: Newnham
- Ends: Riverside
- Named for: Tamar River

Characteristics
- No. of lanes: 4

The Tamar River Bridge is a proposed road bridge to cross the Tamar River between Riverside to Newnham in Tasmania.

In 2024, the Tasmanian Liberal Party announced that the Government of Tasmania is proposing to build a second bridge built across the River Tamar. In 2025, the government announced that it would be built but has not since been built when the government had announced for a new bridge across the River Tamar.

== Proposal ==
The proposal of a Tamar River Bridge will consist to have 4 lanes with a share pathway for bicycle riders and pedestrians. It is unknown what road will go on it but it may possibly be University Way due to some images showing the bridge connecting to University Way and the East Tamar Highway. It is unknown where the bridge will also end at on the west side of the Tamar River but possibly houses being demolished to make way for the new bridge to connect to the West Tamar Highway. There is also controversy for it since it is apparently going to cost AU$1 Billion.
