= Deviot, Tasmania =

Deviot Tasmania
- Coordinates: 41°14′11″S 146°55′22″E
- Population: 337 (2016 census)
- Postcode(s): 7275
- Location: 35 km (22 mi) NW of Launceston
- LGA(s): West Tamar
- Region: Western Tamar Valley
- State electorate(s): Bass
- Federal division(s): Bass
Localities around Deviot:
Sidmouth	Sidmouth	Tamar River
Sidmouth	Deviot	Tamar River
Loira	Robigana	Robigana

Deviot is a locality and small rural community in the local government area of West Tamar, in the Western Tamar Valley region of Tasmania. It is located about 35 kilometres (22 mi) north-west of the town of Launceston. The Tamar River forms the eastern and north-eastern boundaries. The 2016 census determined a population of 337 for the state suburb of Deviot.

== History ==
The locality was gazetted in 1967. Its name may be derived from a property named "Deviot House" which once existed in the district. The word "deviot" is believed to be a derivative of "devious".

== Road infrastructure ==
The C729 route (Motor Road) runs north-east from the West Tamar Highway and passes through the locality.
