= The Carbuncle =

Island in Tasmania, Australia

- Location within Tasmania Location within Australia

Geography
- Location: Tasmania
- Coordinates: 41°7′S 146°33′E
- Area: 0.0191 km^{2} (0.0074 sq mi)

Administration
- Australia
- Tasmania

Demographics
- Population: Uninhabited

The Carbuncle is a small island, part of the North Coast Group of islands, lying in southern Bass Strait near Port Sorell in north-west Tasmania, with an area of 1.91 ha. It is part of the Narawntapu National Park.

An early reference in 1859 called it Carbuncle Island.

== Fauna ==
Recorded breeding seabird species include little penguin and white-faced storm-petrel.
