= Badger Head, Tasmania =

Badger Head Tasmania
- Coordinates: 41°07′45″S 146°43′53″E
- Population: 41 (2016 census)
- Postcode(s): 7270
- Location: 54 km (34 mi) NW of Launceston
- LGA(s): West Tamar
- Region: Western Tamar Valley
- State electorate(s): Bass
- Federal division(s): Bass
Localities around Badger Head:
Bass Strait	Greens Beach	Kelso
Bakers Beach	Badger Head	Greens Beach
Bakers Beach	York Town	Clarence Point

Badger Head is a locality and small rural community in the local government area of West Tamar, in the Western Tamar Valley region of Tasmania. It is located about 54 kilometres (34 mi) north-west of the town of Launceston. Bass Strait forms the north-western and part of the northern boundaries. The 2016 census determined a population of 41 for the state suburb of Badger Head.

== History ==
The locality name was assigned in 1999, and the boundary with York Town was adjusted in 2007.

== Road infrastructure ==
The C721 route (Badger Head Road) intersects with the West Tamar Highway at the south-eastern extremity of the locality. It passes through to the north-west, where it terminates in the Badger Head township.
