= Reedy Marsh, Tasmania =

Reedy Marsh Tasmania
- Coordinates: 41°29′21″S 146°41′34″E
- Population: 185 (2016 census)
- Postcode(s): 7304
- Location: 23 km (14 mi) NW of Westbury
- LGA(s): Meander Valley
- Region: Launceston
- State electorate(s): Lyons
- Federal division(s): Lyons
Localities around Reedy Marsh:
Parkham	Frankford, Birralee	Birralee
Deloraine, Weetah, Parkham	Reedy Marsh	Birralee
Deloraine	Deloraine, Exton	Westbury

Reedy Marsh is a rural locality in the local government area (LGA) of Meander Valley in the Launceston LGA region of Tasmania. It is about 23 kilometres (14 mi) northwest of the town of Westbury. Its population was 185 at the 2016 census.

== History ==
Reedy Marsh was gazetted as a locality in 1968.

== Geography ==
The Meander River forms a small part of the southern boundary.

== Road infrastructure ==
National Route 1 (Bass Highway) passes to the south. Access to the locality is provided by River Road.
