= Weetah, Tasmania =

Weetah
- Town
- Coordinates: 41°27′31″S 146°38′43″E
- Country: Australia
- State: Tasmania
- Region: City of Launceston
- LGA: Meander Valley
- Location: 11 km (6.8 mi) N of Deloraine

Government
  - State electorate: Lyons
  - Federal division: Lyons

Population
  - Total: 75 (SAL 2021)
- Postcode: 7304
Localities around Weetah
Elizabeth Town	Parkham	Reedy Marsh
Elizabeth Town	Weetah	Reedy Marsh
Elizabeth Town	Deloraine	Reedy Marsh

Weetah is a locality and small rural community in the local government area of Meander Valley, in the Launceston region of Tasmania. It is located about 11 kilometres (6.8 mi) north of the town of Deloraine.

== History ==
Previously called Tongataboo, the name was changed about 1914 to Weetah, an Aboriginal word meaning "moon".

The 2016 census determined a population of 44 for the state suburb of Weetah. At the 2021 census, the population had increased to 75.

== Road infrastructure ==
The C710 route (Weetah Road) runs north from the Bass Highway through the locality and then turns west, joining the C711 route (Parkham Road) to return to the Bass Highway at Elizabeth Town.
