= Exton, Tasmania =

Locality in Tasmania, Australia

Exton
- Town
- Coordinates: 41°31′32″S 146°44′58″E
- Country: Australia
- State: Tasmania
- Region: Launceston
- LGA: Meander Valley
- Location: 10 km (6.2 mi) W of Westbury

Government
  - State electorate: Lyons
  - Federal division: Lyons

Population
  - Total: 154 (2016 census)
- Postcode: 7303
Localities around Exton
Reedy Marsh	Reedy Marsh	Reedy Marsh
Deloraine	Exton	Westbury
Deloraine	Deloraine	Osmaston

Exton is a rural locality in the local government area of Meander Valley in the Launceston region of Tasmania. The locality is about 10 kilometres (6.2 mi) west of the town of Westbury. It lies on the outskirts of Deloraine, that lies next to the railway line from Launceston to Devonport. Its population was estimated at 200 in 1932, and the 2011 census reported the area of Reedy Marsh, which incorporated Exton, had a population of 309 people. The 2016 census recorded a population of 154 for the state suburb of Exton.

== History ==
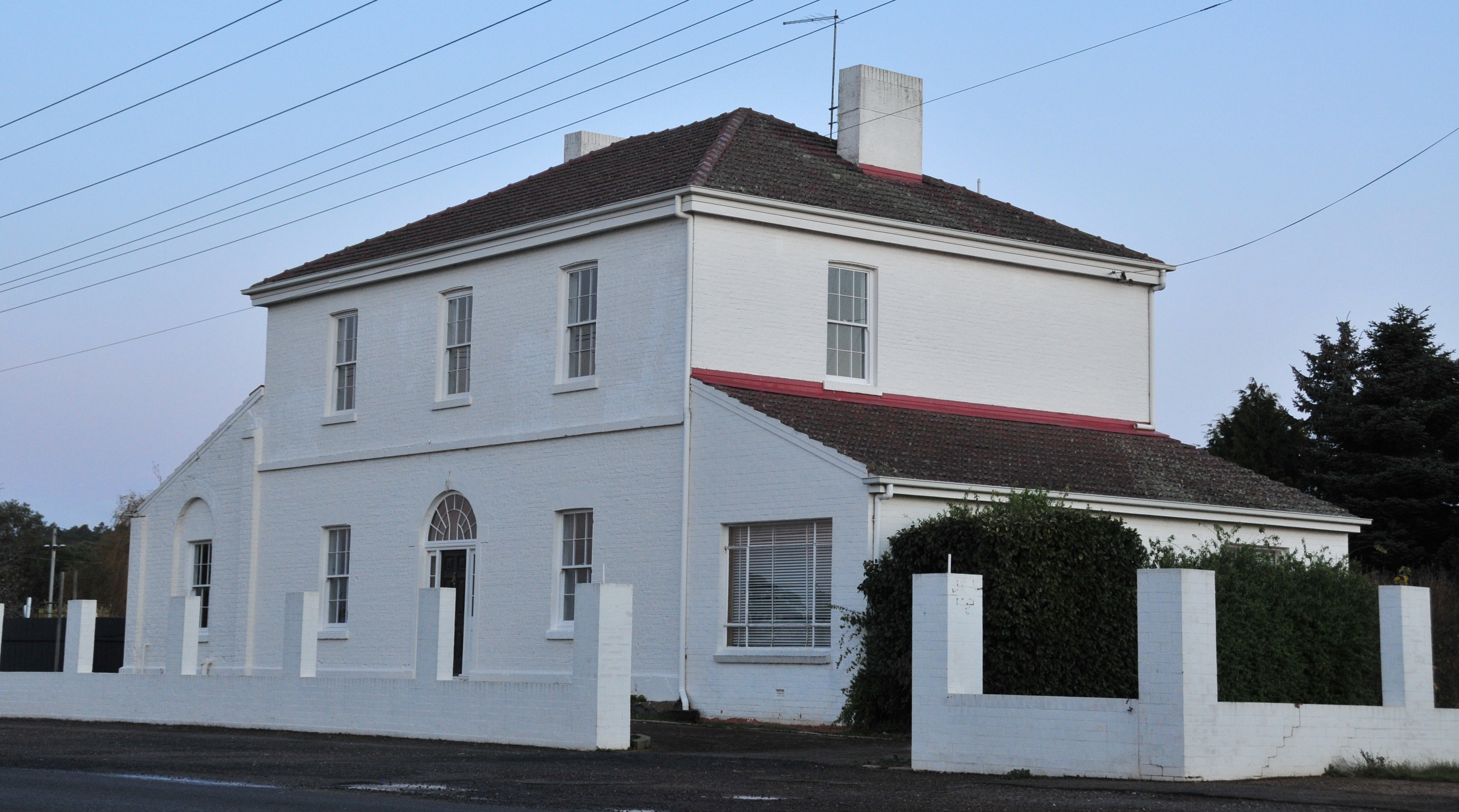
The former Marsh Paddock Inn

Exton was first known as Marsh Paddocks, a name that was used also by an early Inn. Marsh Paddock Inn was built c.1850 for William Walter Motton, owner of a Launceston to Westbury stage coach business in the 1840s. From 1860 to 1864 the licensee was George Axtell, former Port Arthur "Point Puer" juvenile convict. The hotel lost its licence in 1920. The building was renovated in the 1960s and the original top storey removed. It is now a private residence owned by Robert and Naomi McDonnell.

Reverend Samuel Martin arrived in Tasmania on Sir Thomas Monro in 1833, with his wife Sarah Martin (née Exton). Martin purchased a property called "Abbey Lara" and renamed the property Exton in honour of his wife. He built Exton House in 1845, and bred cattle on the estate. The original building was single storey and was replaced by a two-storey building in the 1850s. Around this time the area's name was changed from Marsh Paddocks to Exton. The house was sold to William Hart in 1886, who added verandas and balconies, and it remained in the Hart family until 1924. In the 1930s the Exton Estate covered 10,000 acres (4,000 ha), much of which was let to tenants, and the two-storey Exton House was noted as having 20 rooms.

A Methodist, then Wesleyan, chapel was built in 1856. By 1863 the area had a population of 110, two hotels (the Marsh Hotel and the Exton Hotel), a flour mill, brewery, and a public school. The same year it became part of the Westbury Municipality. Railway transport began when the western line from Launceston to Deloraine opened on 10 February 1871. A state school, and teacher's residence, was built in 1890 at a cost of 247 pounds. The school was closed in 1951, and the building burned down in 1985.

By the 1930s Exton's population had declined due to the mechanization of farming and improved transport reducing the need for labour. At this time the town's services had expanded to include the state school, a railway station, a savings bank, G D Loone's general store and offices for postal, telegraph and money order services. The Anglican Church began construction of Christ Church in 1901 and dedicated the building in 1902. It was still in use in the late 1970s but had closed by 1991.

Exton's cricket club played its first game in 1895 and is one of the oldest in Tasmania. Australian test cricketer Jack Badcock was born in Exton.

Exton was gazetted as a locality in 1968.

== Geography ==
Thee Meander River flows through the locality from west to east, and then forms part of the eastern boundary.

== Road infrastructure ==
The Bass Highway (National Route 1) enters from the east and runs through to the west, where it exits. Route B54 (Meander Valley Road) also passes through from east to west. Route C502 (Exton Road) starts at an intersection with B54 and runs south until it exits.

== Bibliography ==
- Henslowe, Dorothea (1978). Our heritage of Anglican churches in Tasmania. Moonah, Tasmania: Mercury-Walch. ISBN 090962514X.
- Rait, Basil (1974). The sporting history of Westbury, 1823-1973. Westbury: Westbury Council.
- Stephens, Geoffrey (1991). The Anglican Church in Tasmania. A diocesan history to mark the sesquicentenary. Hobart: Trustees of the Diocese. ISBN 064606813X.
- von Stieglitz, K.R. (1946). Then and now in old Westbury : with notes on Exton, Hagley and Carrick. Launceston: Telegraph Printery.
- Westbury Municipal Council (1963). Westbury Municipal centenary 1863-1963. Launceston: Telegraph Printery.
