= Greens Beach, Tasmania =

Greens Beach Tasmania
- Coordinates: 41°05′06″S 146°44′25″E
- Population: 209 (2016 census)
- Postcode(s): 7270
- Location: 61 km (38 mi) NW of Launceston
- LGA(s): West Tamar
- Region: Western Tamar Valley
- State electorate(s): Bass
- Federal division(s): Bass
Localities around Greens Beach:
| Badger Head | Bass Strait | Kelso |
| Badger Head | Greens Beach | Kelso |
| Badger Head | Badger Head | Kelso |

Greens Beach is a locality and small rural community in the local government area of West Tamar, in the Western Tamar Valley region of Tasmania. It is located about 61 kilometres (38 mi) north-west of the town of Launceston. Bass Strait forms the northern boundary. The 2016 census determined a population of 209 for the state suburb of Greens Beach.

== History ==
The locality was gazetted in 1967.

== Road infrastructure ==
The West Tamar Highway runs north-west through the locality, terminating in the Greens Beach township.
