= Latrobe Council =

- Local government area
- Interactive map of Latrobe Council
- Coordinates: 41.2413°S 146.5598°E
- Country: Australia
- State: Tasmania
- Region: North West Tasmania
- Established: 1 January 1907
- Council seat: Latrobe

Government
  - Mayor: Peter Freshney
  - State electorate: Braddon
  - Federal division: Braddon

Area
  - Total: 601 km^{2} (232 sq mi)

Population
  - Total: 11,329 (2018)
  - Density: 18.850/km^{2} (48.82/sq mi)
- Website: Latrobe Council
LGAs around Latrobe Council
Bass Strait	Bass Strait	Bass Strait
Devonport	Latrobe Council	West Tamar
Kentish	Meander Valley	Meander Valley

Latrobe Council is a local government body in Tasmania, situated in the north of the state, east of Devonport. The Latrobe local government area is classified as rural and has a population of 11,329, it encompasses the principal town, Latrobe, and the nearby localities including Port Sorell, Sassafras and Wesley Vale.

== History and attributes ==
The Latrobe municipality was established on 1 January 1907. Latrobe is classified as rural, agricultural and very large under the Australian Classification of Local Governments.

== Current composition ==
Name	Position	Party
Peter Freshney	Mayor	Independent
Vonette Mead	Deputy Mayor	Independent
Gerrad Wicks	Councillor	Independent
Graeme Brown	Councillor	Independent
Garry Sims	Councillor	Independent
Jacki Martin	Councillor	Independent Liberal
David Fidler	Councillor	Independent
Claudia Baldock	Councillor	Independent
Summer Metske	Councillor	Independent

== Suburbs ==
Suburb	Census population 2016	Reason
Wesley Vale	443	
Northdown	221	
Hawley Beach	483	
Shearwater	1,764	
Port Sorell	2,022	
Squeaking Point	223	
Thirlstane	94	
Bakers Beach	60	
Merseylea	56	
Sassafras	347	
Harford	74	
Moriarty	223	
Latrobe	4,169	
Tarleton	380	
Total	10,559	
	140	Variance
Local government total	10,699	Gazetted Central Coast local government area

=== Not in above list ===
- Beaconsfield
- Frankford
- Holwell
- Parkham
- York Town

== See also ==
- List of local government areas of Tasmania
