= Shearwater, Tasmania =

Shearwater Tasmania
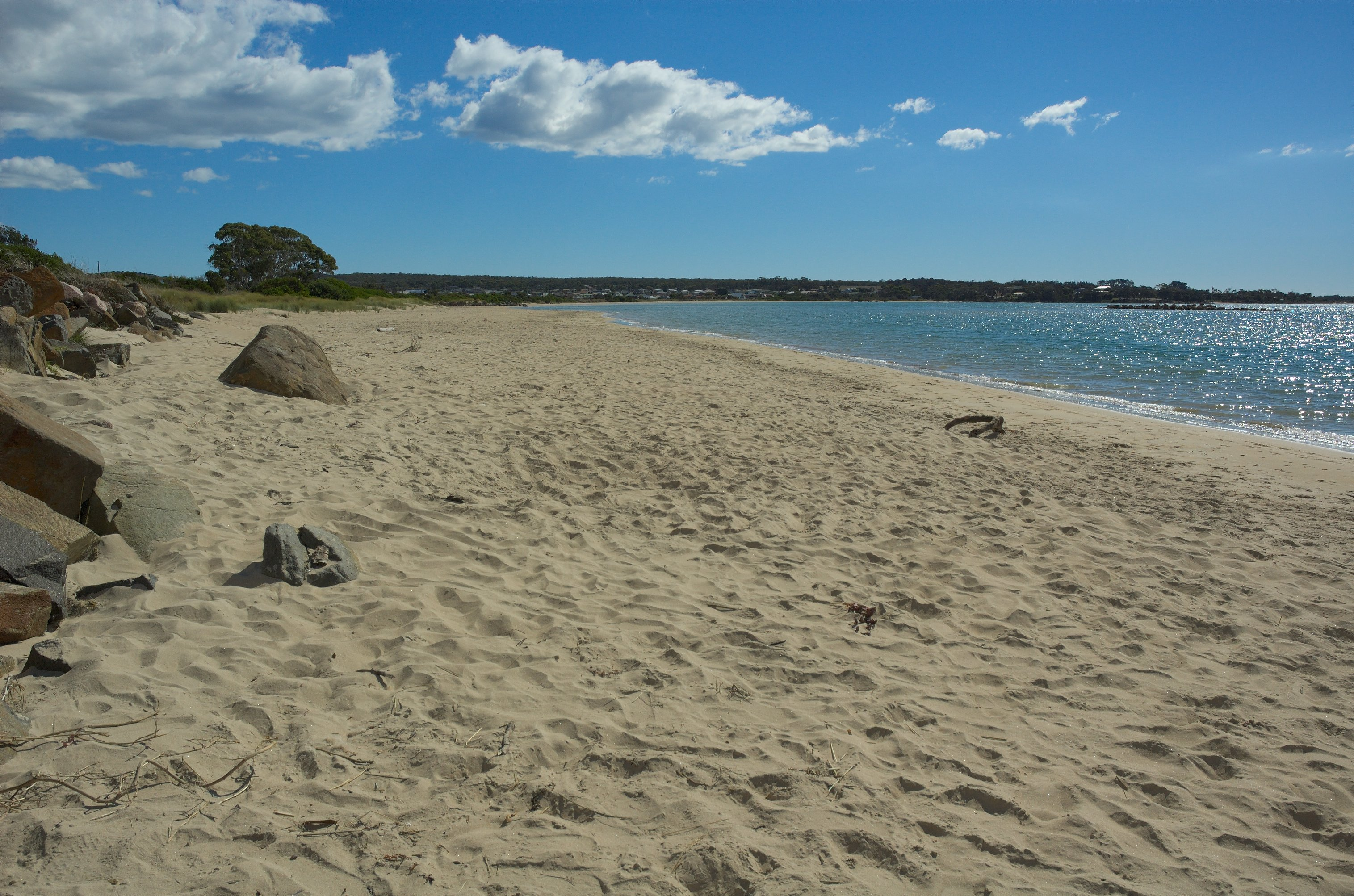
- Freers Beach

- Coordinates: 41°10′S 146°32′E
- Population: 1,764 (2016 census)
- Postcode(s): 7307
- Location: 254 km (158 mi) N of Hobart; 79 km (49 mi) NW of Launceston; 20 km (12 mi) E of Devonport; 2 km (1 mi) NW of Port Sorell
- LGA(s): Latrobe Council
- State electorate(s): Braddon
- Federal division(s): Braddon

Shearwater is a town on the north coast of Tasmania, Australia. It lies on the Rubicon Rivulet, just off Bass Strait, 19.6 km east of Devonport. The town of Port Sorell and Hawley Beach neighbour Shearwater. At the 2016 census, Shearwater had a population of 1764. The town grows considerably during the holiday season. It is part of the Municipality of Latrobe.

Shearwater is one of many popular holiday resorts along the north coast of Tasmania. In recent years the population has swelled and become one of the fastest-growing areas in the world; mainly due to affordable real estate and large developments in the area, including a shopping centre, the Port Sorell Golf Club, and the Shearwater Resort. It borders the Rubicon Estuary, which has been identified by BirdLife International as an Important Bird Area because of its importance for waders, especially pied oystercatchers.
