= Gardner Island =

Island of Antarctica

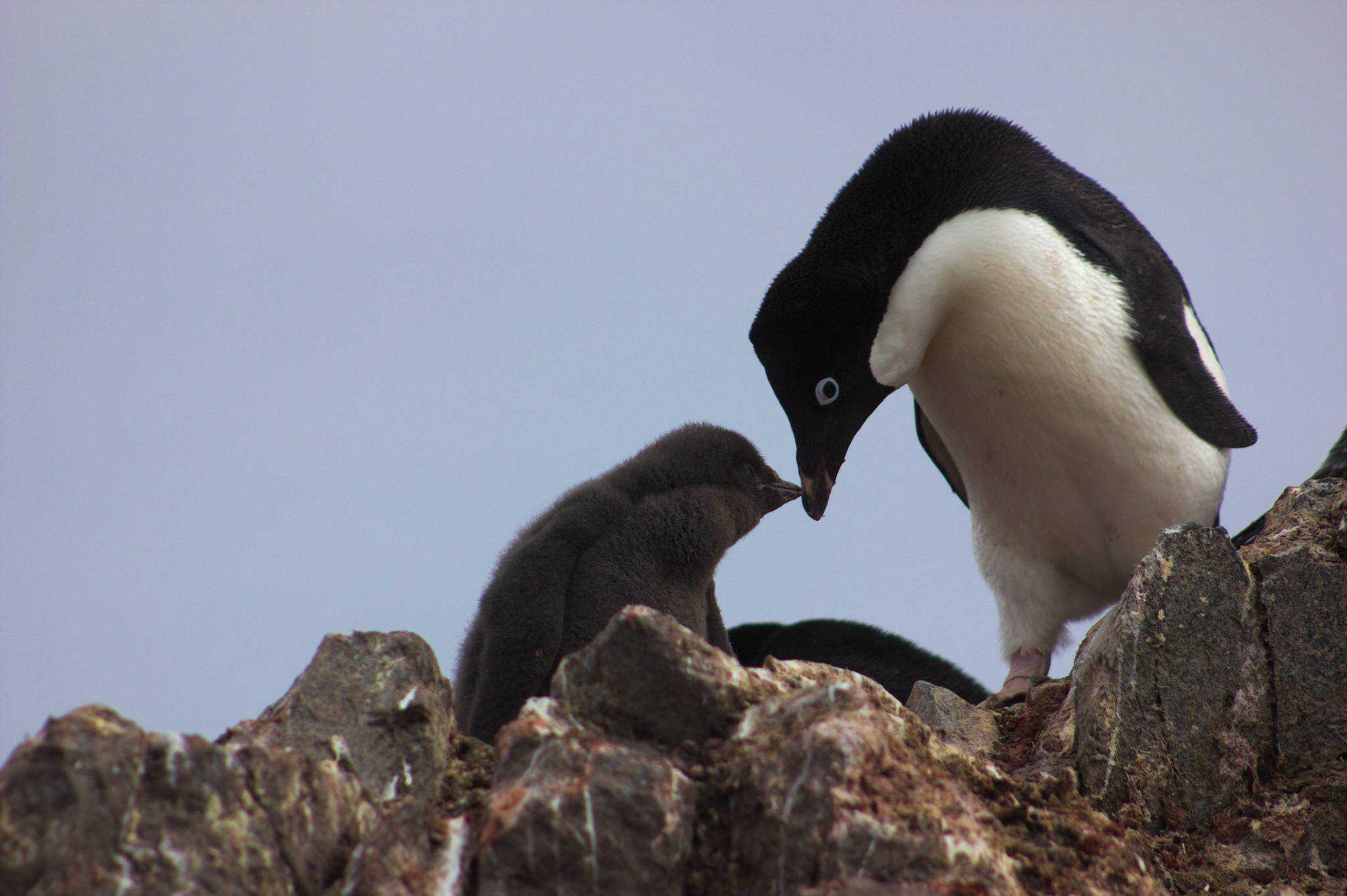
- Adélie penguins breed on the island

- Location within Antarctica

Geography
- Location: Prydz Bay, Princess Elizabeth Land, Antarctica
- Coordinates: 68°34′41″S 77°52′14″E
- Area: 51 ha (130 acres)
- Length: 1.2 km (0.75 mi)
- Width: 0.5 km (0.31 mi)
- Highest elevation: 47 m (154 ft)

Administration
- Administered under the Antarctic Treaty System

Demographics
- Population: Uninhabited

Gardner Island is a largely ice-free island which lies about 3 km west of Broad Peninsula in the southern Vestfold Hills, in Prydz Bay on the Ingrid Christensen Coast of Princess Elizabeth Land, Antarctica. It has been designated an Important Bird Area (IBA) by BirdLife International because it supports about 27,000 breeding pairs of Adélie penguins. Snow petrels also breed on the island. The nearest permanent research station is Australia's Davis Station, 3 km to the east on Broad Peninsula.

== See also ==
- Gardner Pinnacles (Pacific island)
