= Supply River =

River in Tasmania, Australia

Supply
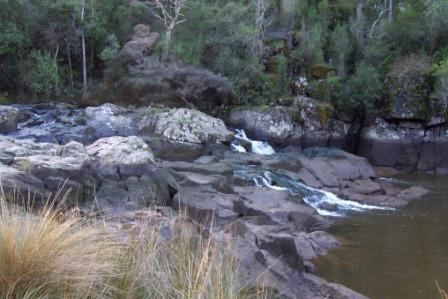
- A small series of rapids near the river mouth

- Location of the Supply River mouth in Tasmania

Location
- Country: Australia
- State: Tasmania
- Region: Northern Tasmania

Physical characteristics
- Source: Mount Careless Forest Reserve
  - location: below Kellys Lookout
  - coordinates: 41°18′5″S 146°46′6″E
  - elevation: 416 m (1,365 ft)
- Mouth: Tamar River
  - location: Supply Bay, Robigana
  - coordinates: 41°15′28″S 146°56′48″E
  - elevation: 0 m (0 ft)
- Length: 27 km (17 mi)

Basin features
- River system: Tamar River
- Tributaries
  - left: Rookery Creek
  - right: Tunks Creek

The Supply River is a perennial river in the northern region of Tasmania, Australia. The river is home to multiple species of fresh and saltwater fish. These include Australian salmon, brown trout and bream.

== Location and features ==
The river rises below Kellys Lookout within the Mount Careless Forest Reserve, southwest of Beaconsfield and west of Exeter. The river flows generally east-northeast, joined by two minor tributaries before reaching its confluence with the Tamar River at Robigana. From this point, the river enters the Bass Strait. The river descends 416 metres (1,365 ft) over its 27-kilometre (17 mi) course. The river is transversed by the West Tamar Highway.

The river draws its name from the supply of fresh water at a waterfall just 500 metres (1,600 ft) from the river mouth, discovered in 1804 when Lady Nelson sailed up the Tamar River. A water mill was built c. 1825, approximately 30 kilometres (19 mi) north of Launceston, upstream of the junction of the Tamar and Supply rivers. A 500-metre (1,600 ft) walking trail leads from the river mouth to the water mill.

== See also ==
- Rivers of Tasmania
