= Latrobe, Tasmania =

Latrobe
- Town
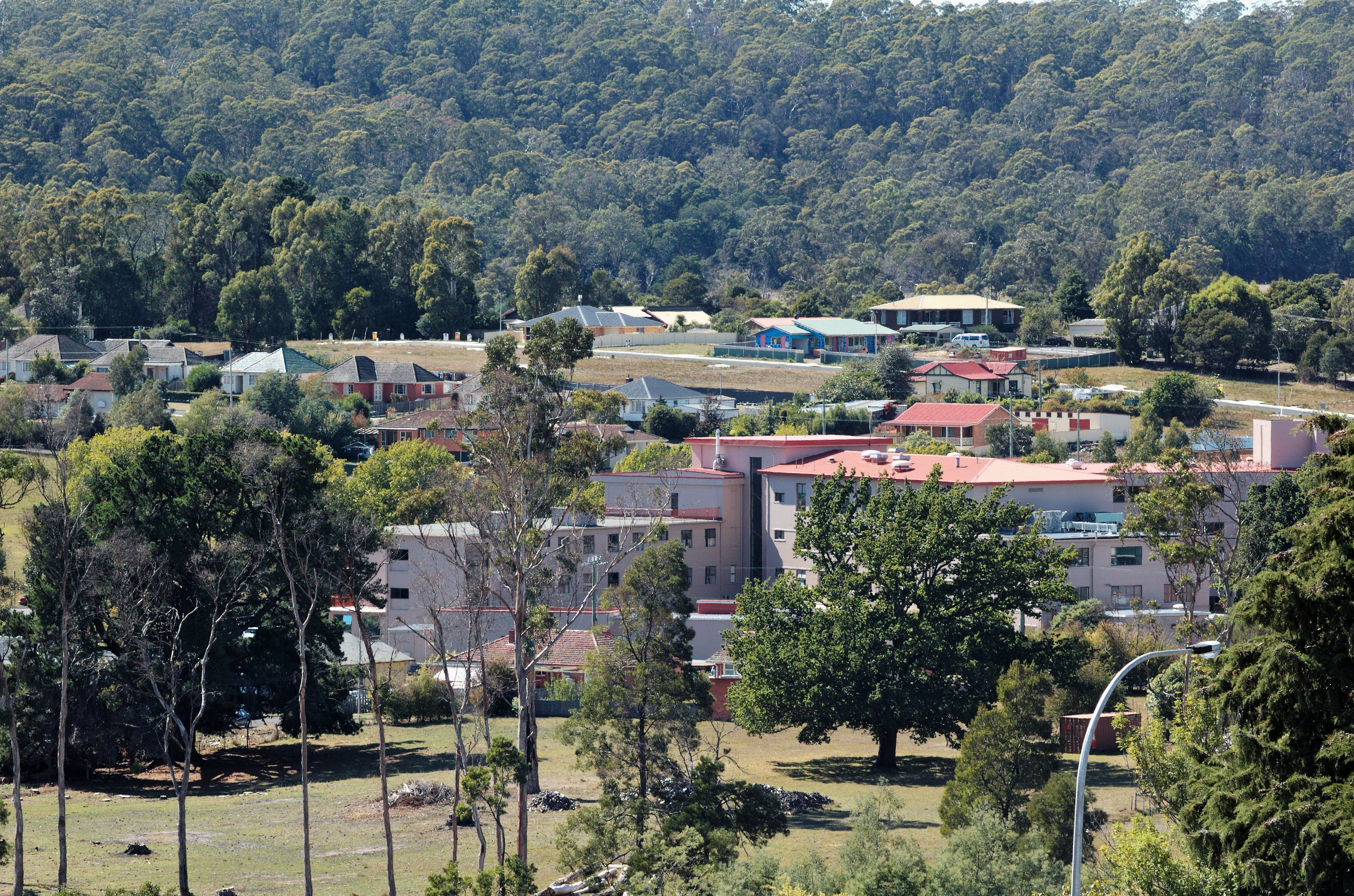
- Mersey Community Hospital as seen from Perrin Court, 2007

- Coordinates: 41°14′S 146°45′E
- Country: Australia
- State: Tasmania
- LGA: Latrobe Council
- Location: 11 km (6.8 mi) from Devonport; 43 km (27 mi) from Deloraine; 82 km (51 mi) from Launceston

Government
  - State electorate: Braddon
  - Federal division: Braddon
- Elevation: 52 m (171 ft)

Population
  - Total: 4,169 (2016 census)
- Postcode: 7307
- Mean max temp: 17.1 °C (62.8 °F)
- Mean min temp: 8.4 °C (47.1 °F)
- Annual rainfall: 766.8 mm (30.19 in)

Latrobe is a town in north-western Tasmania, Australia on the Mersey River. It is 8 km south-east of Devonport on the Bass Highway. It is the main centre of the Latrobe Council. At the 2006 census, Latrobe had a population of 2,843. By the 2016 census, this had increased to 4,169. The locality is in the Latrobe Council area, but with a mere 0.1% in the Kentish Council LGA.

== History ==
The area was first settled by B. B. Thomas in 1826 and, in 1861, the settlement was named for Charles Joseph La Trobe (1801–1875), the administrator of the colony of Tasmania.

La Trobe Post Office opened on 31 August 1860 and was renamed Latrobe in 1873.

Latrobe has a museum based in the old court house.

=== Climate ===
Latrobe has an oceanic climate (Köppen: Cfb), with very mild, slightly drier summers and cool, wetter winters. Average maxima vary from 21.8 °C (71.2 °F) in February to 12.9 °C (55.2 °F) in July while average minima fluctuate between 12.6 °C (54.7 °F) in January and February and 4.8 °C (40.6 °F) in July. Mean average annual precipitation is moderate, 766.8 mm (30.19 in) spread between 129.8 precipitation days. However, the town is not sunny, with 146.8 cloudy days and only 56.1 clear days per annum. Extreme temperatures have ranged from 33.2 °C (91.8 °F) on 9 January 2010 to −4.8 °C (23.4 °F) on 25 August 1991. Climate data was sourced from the nearby Devonport Airport, while sun data was taken from Forthside.

Climate data for Latrobe (41º10'12"S, 146º25'48"E, 8 m AMSL) (1962-2024 normals & extremes)
Month	Jan	Feb	Mar	Apr	May	Jun	Jul	Aug	Sep	Oct	Nov	Dec	Year
Record high °C (°F)	33.2 (91.8)	30.6 (87.1)	29.0 (84.2)	24.9 (76.8)	20.7 (69.3)	18.8 (65.8)	17.6 (63.7)	18.1 (64.6)	20.0 (68.0)	24.8 (76.6)	28.2 (82.8)	30.9 (87.6)	33.2 (91.8)
Mean daily maximum °C (°F)	21.7 (71.1)	21.8 (71.2)	20.5 (68.9)	17.9 (64.2)	15.4 (59.7)	13.5 (56.3)	12.9 (55.2)	13.2 (55.8)	14.4 (57.9)	16.0 (60.8)	18.0 (64.4)	19.9 (67.8)	17.1 (62.8)
Mean daily minimum °C (°F)	12.6 (54.7)	12.6 (54.7)	11.0 (51.8)	8.7 (47.7)	6.8 (44.2)	5.1 (41.2)	4.8 (40.6)	5.1 (41.2)	6.1 (43.0)	7.4 (45.3)	9.3 (48.7)	10.8 (51.4)	8.4 (47.0)
Record low °C (°F)	4.0 (39.2)	−1.2 (29.8)	−2.5 (27.5)	−0.8 (30.6)	−1.8 (28.8)	−1.9 (28.6)	−2.2 (28.0)	−4.8 (23.4)	−2.0 (28.4)	−2.3 (27.9)	0.6 (33.1)	1.6 (34.9)	−4.8 (23.4)
Average precipitation mm (inches)	43.3 (1.70)	36.2 (1.43)	48.8 (1.92)	60.4 (2.38)	72.2 (2.84)	78.3 (3.08)	94.5 (3.72)	89.2 (3.51)	72.2 (2.84)	63.9 (2.52)	55.7 (2.19)	50.9 (2.00)	766.8 (30.19)
Average precipitation days (≥ 0.2 mm)	7.0	6.2	7.9	9.6	12.0	12.7	15.2	15.6	13.5	11.6	9.9	8.6	129.8
Average afternoon relative humidity (%)	61	61	59	62	66	68	69	68	66	63	65	61	64
Average dew point °C (°F)	11.3 (52.3)	12.0 (53.6)	10.3 (50.5)	8.7 (47.7)	7.7 (45.9)	6.4 (43.5)	5.9 (42.6)	6.0 (42.8)	6.3 (43.3)	7.1 (44.8)	9.2 (48.6)	9.8 (49.6)	8.4 (47.1)
Mean monthly sunshine hours	266.6	234.5	207.7	168.0	136.4	123.0	130.2	148.8	177.0	223.2	234.0	254.2	2,303.6
Percentage possible sunshine	58	61	54	51	45	44	44	46	50	54	53	54	51
Source: Bureau of Meteorology (1962-2024 normals & extremes)

== Facilities ==
The Mersey Community Hospital is located in Latrobe. It is approximately a 100-bed hospital that provides services including: ambulatory and emergency, general adult medicine, general paediatric medicine, general surgery including orthopaedic, ear, nose and throat, ophthalmological, certain oncology services, limited rehabilitation services and allied health support. From 1 September 2008, the hospital is owned by the Commonwealth and operated by the Tasmanian Government.

The main shopping district can be found along Gilbert Street where a number of hotels, cafes, restaurants and shops call home, such as Supa IGA.

House of Anvers is a chocolate factory in Latrobe specialising in Belgian chocolates.

There are aged care facilities in Latrobe such as Uniting AgeWell Strathdevon Community.

The Australian Axemans Hall of Fame showcasing Australia's wood-chopping sporting champions is located on Bells Parade. The Big Platypus, one of Australia's big things, is outside the museum.

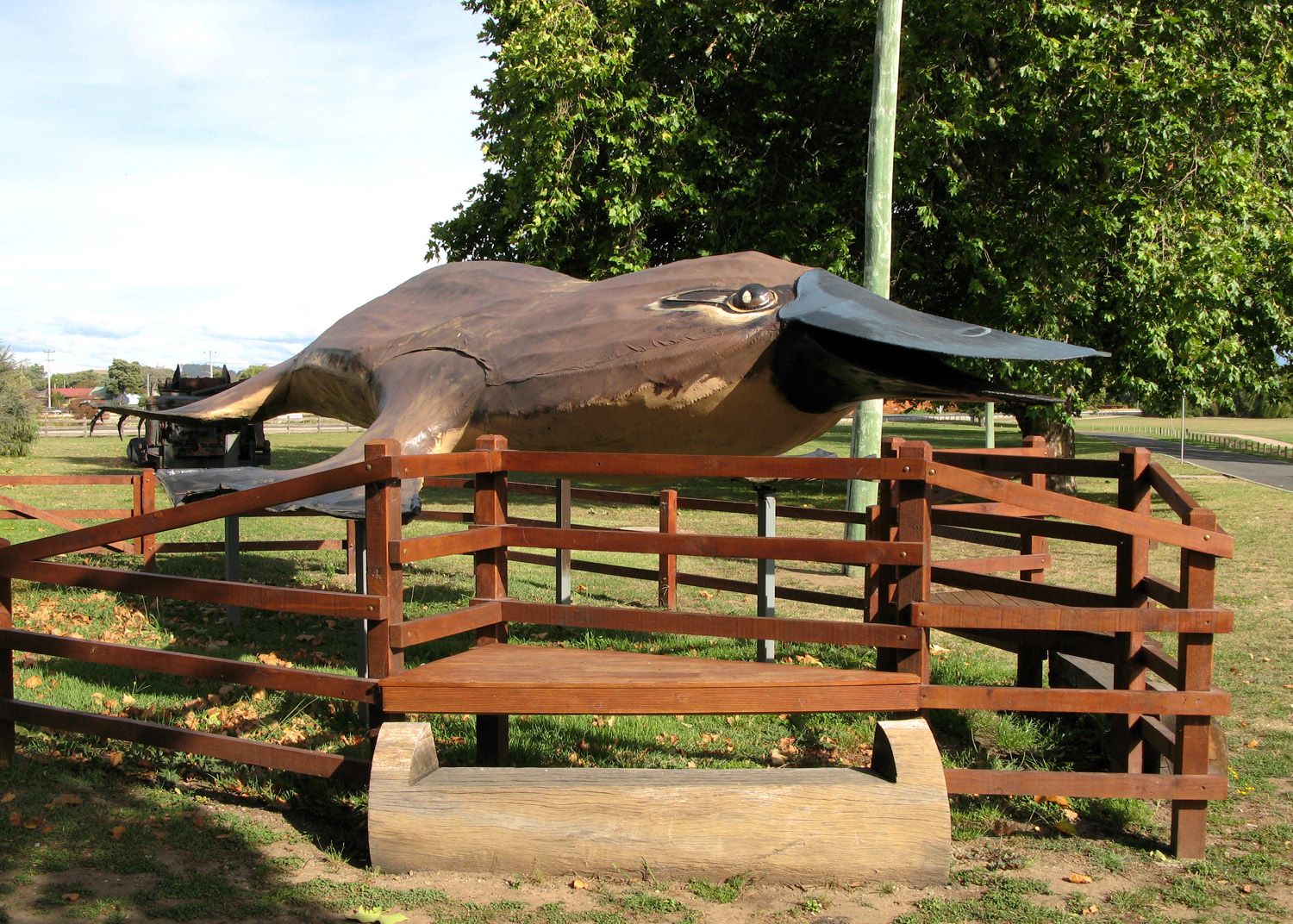
Big Platypus at the Australian Axeman's Hall of Fame

Following flooding in 2016, work began on a flood mitigation system for the town involving both a levee and diversion culvert. Construction began in 2022 and ended in 2023.

== Sporting activities ==
Latrobe's Henley-on-Mersey Regatta held on Australia Day 26 January each year at Belles Parade consists of woodchopping, Ferret racing, Triathlon, Iron Trial Strongman, Boat Race, Cherry Spitting and Gum boot throwing. The Christmas Carnival Series is a series of professional athletics and professional cycling events. The boxing day carnival (26 December) is held at the Latrobe Recreation Ground. This event also stages a woodchopping event. Latrobe Football Club and Latrobe Cricket Club also utilize the Latrobe Recreation Ground. Latrobe Basketball Club play in the North West Basketball Union and play out of the Latrobe and Districts Youth Centre. Tennis is played at the Latrobe Tennis Club. Latrobe has a netball team that competes in the Devon Netball Association.

Latrobe Speedway, a clay race track hosts Sprintcars, Street Stocks, AMCA Nationals, Bombers, Junior Sedans, Formula 500s, Modified Sedans, Karts, Wingless Sedans, Tassie Sixers, Speedcars, Caravan Derby and Demolition Derby.

== Education ==
Education facilities include Latrobe Primary School, Latrobe High School, St. Patrick's Catholic School and Geneva Christian College.

== Notable people ==
- Darrel Baldock
- Dolly Dalrymple
- Michael Field – politician
- Christine Milne – politician
- Teddy Sheean
- James Monaghan Dooley - politician
