= Rubicon Estuary =

Estuary in Tasmania, Australia

Coordinates: 41°10′53″S 146°34′33″E

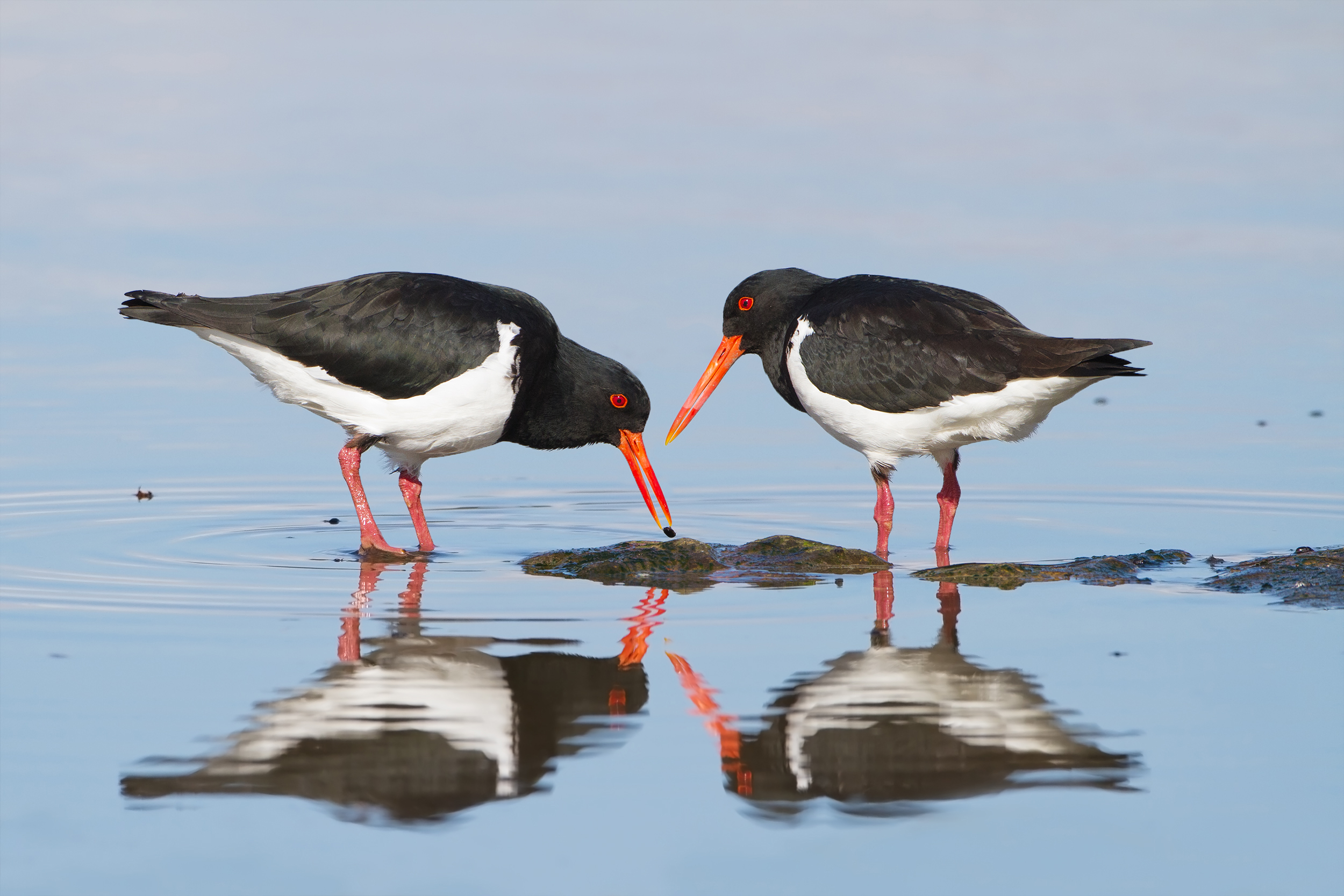
The estuary is an important site for pied oystercatchers

The Rubicon Estuary is an estuary on the central coast of northern Tasmania, south-eastern Australia, lying next to the town of Port Sorell.

== Description ==
The estuary has a shallow muddy substrate and is fed by several streams, including the Franklin Rivulet and Rubicon River. It is bounded by Port Sorell, Hawley Beach, Shearwater and Squeaking Point on the west, the Narawntapu National Park on the north-east, and pasture on the east and south.

== Birds ==
The site has been identified by BirdLife International as a 14 km^{2} Important Bird Area (IBA) because it supports over 1% of the world population of pied oystercatchers, as well as smaller numbers of other wader species.
