= Tamar River =

River in Tasmania, Australia

kanamaluka / River Tamar
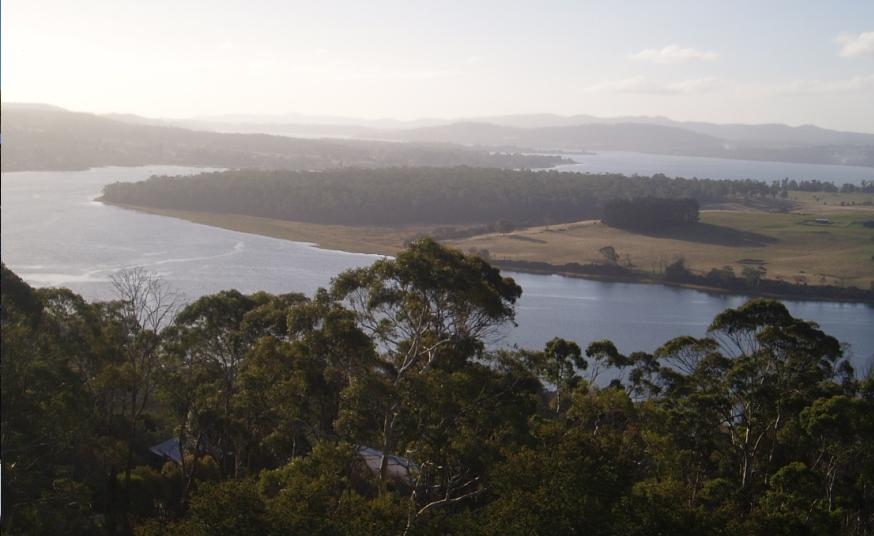
- kanamaluka / River Tamar from Brady's lookout, near Exeter

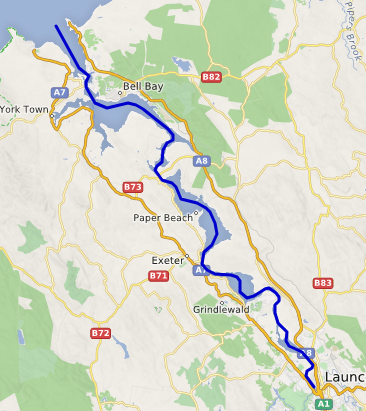
- Course of kanamaluka / River Tamar
- Etymology: River Tamar
- Native name: kanamaluka

Location
- Country: Australia
- Region: Tasmania, Northern Tasmania
- City: Launceston

Physical characteristics
- Source confluence: South and North Esk Rivers
  - location: Launceston
  - coordinates: 41°26′4″S 147°7′38″E
- Mouth: Port Dalrymple, Bass Strait
  - location: Low Head
  - coordinates: 41°3′19″S 146°46′28″E
  - elevation: 0 m (0 ft)
- Length: 70 km (43 mi)

Basin features
- Tributaries
  - left: Supply River
- State reserve: Tamar Conservation Area

The Tamar River, officially kanamaluka / River Tamar, is a 70-kilometre (43-mile) estuary located in northern Tasmania, Australia. Despite being named a river, the waterway is a brackish and tidal estuary over its entire length.

== Etymology ==
The Tamar River was named after the River Tamar in South West England by Colonel William Paterson in December 1804.

== Location and features ==
Formed by the confluence of the North Esk and South Esk rivers at Launceston, kanamaluka / River Tamar flows generally north towards its mouth at Low Head, north of the settlement George Town and into the Bass Strait via Port Dalrymple. kanamaluka / River Tamar has several minor tributaries including the Supply River.

Low Head Lighthouse is located at the tip of a peninsula on the eastern side of the river mouth. The only full crossing of the river is the Batman Bridge in the relatively remote area of Sidmouth, approximately halfway along the river.

The Tamar has perennial issues with silting, contributing to its slow decline in commercial navigational use. This has required occasional dredging operations. A scheme enacted between the 1920s and 1970s planned to partially dam the river and slow the flow around the western side of Tamar Island and speed up the flow around the eastern side (the main channel) by sinking 14 boats to disrupt water flow. The success of this project is debated.

== Navigation and fishing ==
The Port of Launceston is now used very rarely, and the SeaCat Tasmania ferry no longer docks at George Town. Despite this, the Tamar is still used for commercial shipping, with industries at George Town including an aluminium smelter and river cruise operator.

The last 10 kilometres of the Tamar River estuary are generally smooth and sheltered waters, depending on tidal and weather conditions. The Clarence Point boat ramp has picnic amenities, toilets, and a pontoon on the western side. The more wind exposed basic boat ramp at Kelso is a few kilometres further north.

George Town, a significant port town, lies on the eastern side and has amenities nearby. The Low Head boat ramp is also on the eastern side, just past Pilot Bay, several kilometres further north.

== See also ==
- Rivers of Tasmania
- Tamar Wetlands Important Bird Area
- Tamar River Bridge
