= Port Sorell, Tasmania =

Port Sorell
- Town
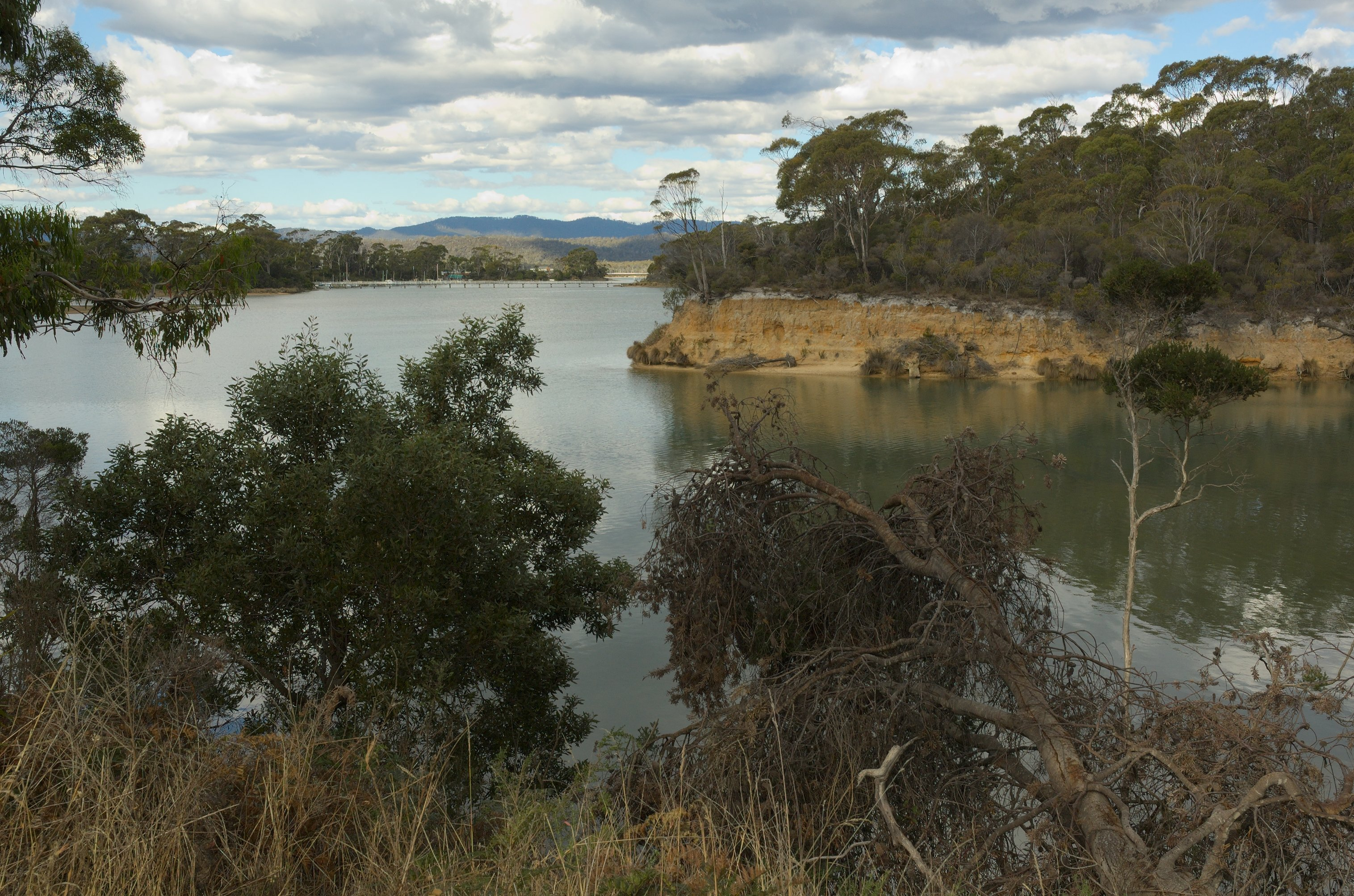
- Panatana Rivulet

- Coordinates: 41°10′S 146°33′E
- Country: Australia
- State: Tasmania
- LGA: Latrobe Council
- Location: 254 km (158 mi) N of Hobart; 79 km (49 mi) NW of Launceston, Tasmania; 20 km (12 mi) E of Devonport

Government
  - State electorate: Braddon
  - Federal division: Braddon

Population
  - Total: 2,221 (2021 census)
- Postcode: 7307

Port Sorell is a town on the north-central coast of Tasmania, Australia. It is on the waterway of the same name, just off Bass Strait, 20 km east of Devonport and close to Shearwater and Hawley Beach. It borders the Rubicon Estuary, which has been identified by BirdLife International as an Important Bird Area because of its importance for waders, especially pied oystercatchers.

== History ==
The area was named Panatana by local Aborigines. The town was originally a fishing and sealing port named Burgess, however the name was officially changed to Port Sorell (after Governor Sorell) in 1822. In 1823, in an attempt to encourage further immigration to the North, Governor Sorell would dispatch Captain Charles Browne Hardwicke to the area. While outright not discouraging Port Sorell itself, he would describe the land west (stretching to at least the Mersey River and perhaps across to Circular Head) as "practically impenatrable and uninhabitable" for increased Migration North

Hardwicke would also comment on the Native Tasmanians in the area, whom he described as "Numerous, and appear disposed to be friendly towards Europeans, as we had communication with them." This was in stark contrast to his descriptions of Tasmanians to the west in the Circular Heads area, whom he described as "extremely wild" and shy with "one party running away at a great distance."

The town could have been a lot larger than it is now, had it not been for bushfires, after which nearby Devonport grew to become a major port. At the 2021 census, Port Sorell had a population of 2,221. Today Port Sorell is one of many popular holiday spots along the north coast of Tasmania.

The first Port Sorell Post Office opened on 1 February 1845 and closed in 1863. The current office opened on 3 July 1944.
