= Glengarry, Tasmania =

Glengarry
- Town
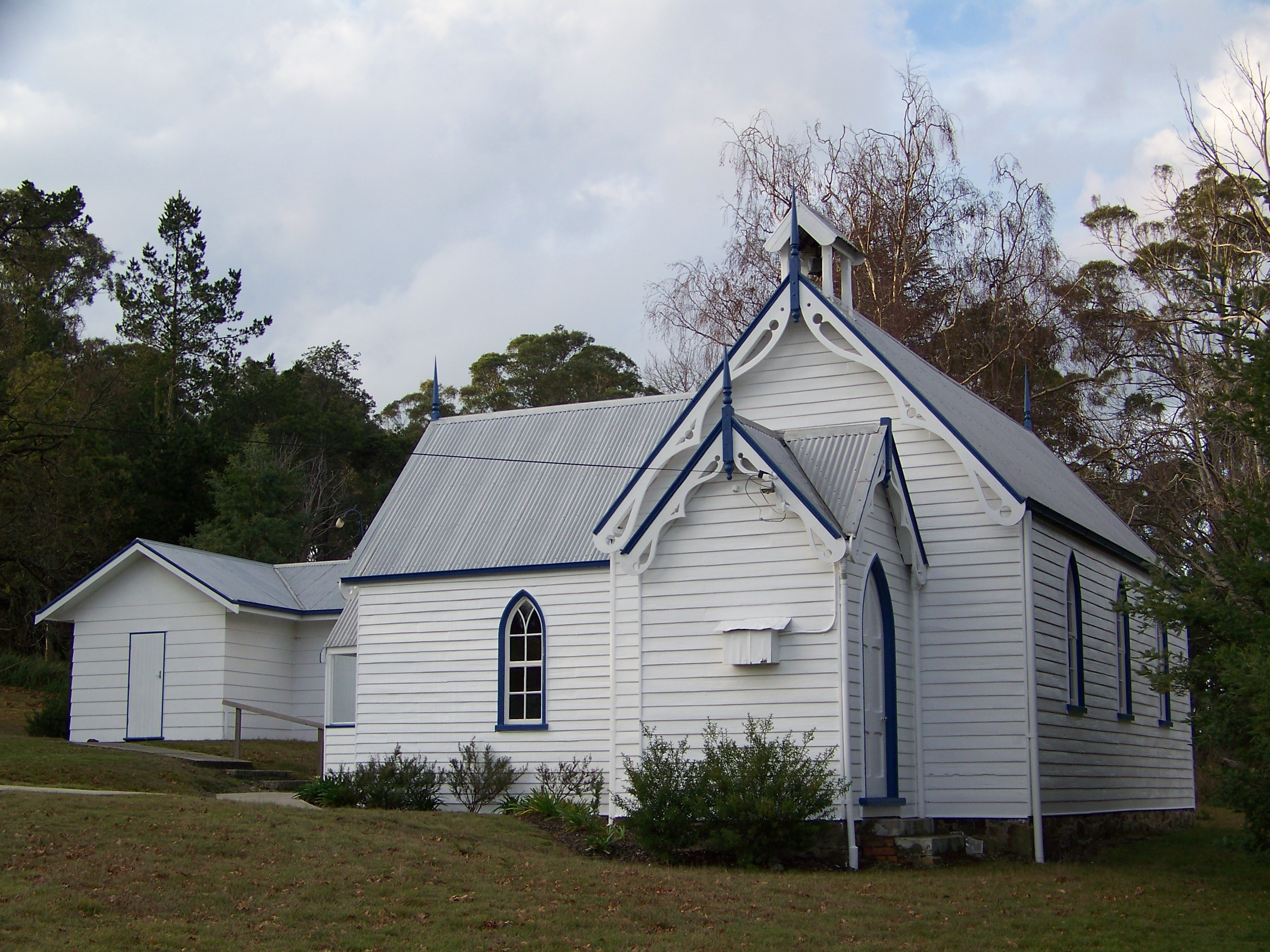
- Glengarry Presbyterian Church

- Coordinates: 41°19′47″S 146°52′44″E
- Country: Australia
- State: Tasmania
- Region: Launceston
- LGA: West Tamar
- Location: 26 km (16 mi) SE of Beaconsfield

Government
  - State electorate: Bass
  - Federal division: Bass

Population
  - Total: 525 (2016 census)
Localities around Glengarry
Winkleigh	Winkleigh	Winkleigh
Frankford	Glengarry	Exeter
Birralee	Rosevale, Selbourne	Notley Hills, Bridgenorth

Glengarry is a rural locality in the local government area of West Tamar in the Launceston region of Tasmania. The locality is about 26 kilometres (16 mi) south-east of the town of Beaconsfield. The 2016 census recorded a population of 525 for the state suburb of Glengarry.

== History ==
Glengarry Post Office opened on 1 December 1878. The name is Scottish in origin. Glengarry was gazetted as a locality in 1966.

== Geography ==
The Supply River forms part of the northern boundary. Tunks Creek, a tributary of the Supply River, flows through from south to north.

== Road infrastructure ==
Route B71 (Frankford Road) passes through from north-east to south-west. Route C716 (Lamont Road) starts at an intersection with B71 and runs north-west until it exits. Route C718 (Glengarry Road) starts at an intersection with B71 and runs north until it exits.
