= Gravelly Beach, Tasmania =

Gravelly Beach Tasmania
- Coordinates: 41°16′44″S 146°57′58″E
- Population: 567 (2016 census)
- Postcode(s): 7276
- Location: 28 km (17 mi) NW of Launceston
- LGA(s): West Tamar
- Region: Western Tamar Valley
- State electorate(s): Bass
- Federal division(s): Bass
Localities around Gravelly Beach:
Robigana	Robigana	Swan Point
Exeter	Gravelly Beach	Tamar River
Exeter	Lanena	Blackwall

Gravelly Beach is a locality and small rural community in the local government area of West Tamar, in the Western Tamar Valley region of Tasmania. It is located about 28 kilometres (17 mi) north-west of the city of Launceston. The Tamar River forms the eastern boundary. The 2016 census determined a population of 567 for the state suburb of Gravelly Beach.

== History ==
The locality was originally known (in 1910) as Sallaby.

== Road infrastructure ==
The C728 route (Gravelly Beach Road) runs east from the West Tamar Highway and passes through the locality from south-east to north-west, providing access to several other localities.
