= Rosevears, Tasmania =

Rosevears Tasmania
- Coordinates: 41°19′52″S 146°58′49″E
- Population: 352 (2016 census)
- Postcode(s): 7277
- Location: 22 km (14 mi) NW of Launceston
- LGA(s): West Tamar
- Region: Western Tamar Valley
- State electorate(s): Bass
- Federal division(s): Bass
Localities around Rosevears:
Exeter	Lanena	Tamar River
Exeter	Rosevears	Tamar River
Bridgenorth	Grindelwald	Legana

Rosevears is a locality and small rural community in the local government area of West Tamar, in the Western Tamar Valley region of Tasmania. It is located about 22 kilometres (14 mi) north-west of the town of Launceston. The Tamar River forms the eastern and north-eastern boundaries. The 2016 census determined a population of 352 for the state suburb of Rosevears.

== History ==
The locality is believed to be named for the Rosevear family, the original European settlers on the land.

== Road infrastructure ==
The West Tamar Highway passes through the locality from south-east to north-west, and the C733 route (Rosevears Drive) runs from the highway along the river bank before rejoining it.
