= Beaconsfield Mine & Heritage Centre =

Museum in Beaconsfield, Tasmania, Australia

Coordinates: 41°12′06″S 146°48′57″E

The Beaconsfield Mine & Heritage Centre is located in Beaconsfield, Tasmania. It was originally called the Grubb Shaft Gold and Heritage Museum. It was formed in 1972 after discussions were held as to forming a district museum, after which construction of the actual centre began, finally being opened in 1984. It is currently run by the West Tamar Council and holds over 10,000 pieces in its collection.

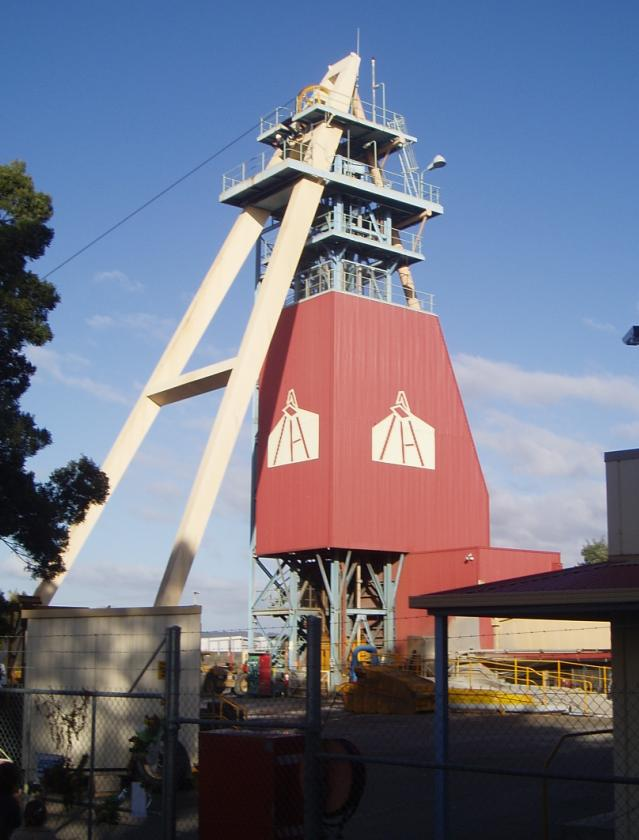
Beaconsfield mine

== History ==
The West Tamar Historical committee was formed and between 1972 and 1981 the committee collected historical material and raised money. In 1982 the Grubb Shaft engine house ruins became available to the West Tamar Historical Committee. The committee began the process of developing the ruins into a tourist attraction to house and preserve the rich history of the area.

In 1984 the Grubb Shaft Gold and Heritage Museum officially opened. In 1999 the West Tamar Historical Committee handed the management of the museum to the West Tamar Council.

In 2006 after the Beaconsfield Mine collapse, which resulted in closure of the mine for 12 months, the centre was granted funds from the Federal Governments’ AusIndustry program. These funds provided a significant boost to the centre and funded developments to increase the floor space of the centre and the visitor experience. In 2008 the name of the centre was changed from the Grubb Shaft Gold & Heritage Museum to the Beaconsfield Mine & Heritage Centre.

The Beaconsfield Mine & Heritage Centre is owned and operated by the West Tamar Council. The centre provides a significant economic benefit to the West Tamar and Beaconsfield community.

The centre houses over 10,000 pieces in its collection, which continually receives donations from the Tamar Valley community. Staff preserve artefacts and work to acquire new pieces.
