= Paterson Street, Launceston =

Street in the Launceston CBD in Tasmania

Paterson Street Tasmania

General information
- Type: Street
- Location: Launceston
- Length: 1 km (0.6 mi)
- Route number(s): A3
- Former route number: State Route 3

Major junctions
- East end: A3 George Street
- A8 East Tamar Highway A3 Charles Street St John Street
- West end: Bridge Road, Launceston

Paterson Street is a 1 km (0.6 mile) street, located in the Launceston Central Business District in Tasmania, Australia.

== Route description ==
The street starts on Bridge Road near the West Tamar Highway, and the South Esk River, near the King's Bridge. It stays as a typical two-lane street meeting the first intersection with Margaret Street with pairs of traffic lights. It goes past the Launceston Collage and other buildings and a small park while going over the East Tamar Highway. It goes past the Launceston Fire Station after intersecting with the other one-way part of the East Tamar Highway. It goes past the West Paterson Street Multi Storey Car Park, and Hertz Global Holdings, and meets the intersection for Charles Street. Charles Street carries the A3 route, which goes onto Paterson Street. It goes past the National Theatre which from there, the street becomes a one-way only street. It goes past the Birchalls book store, and Myer, which then intersects with St John Street. It goes past a few other buildings, the Centre Way Arcade, and the East Paterson Street Multi Storey Car Park, which then ends on George Street.

== Landmarks ==
=== The Examiner ===
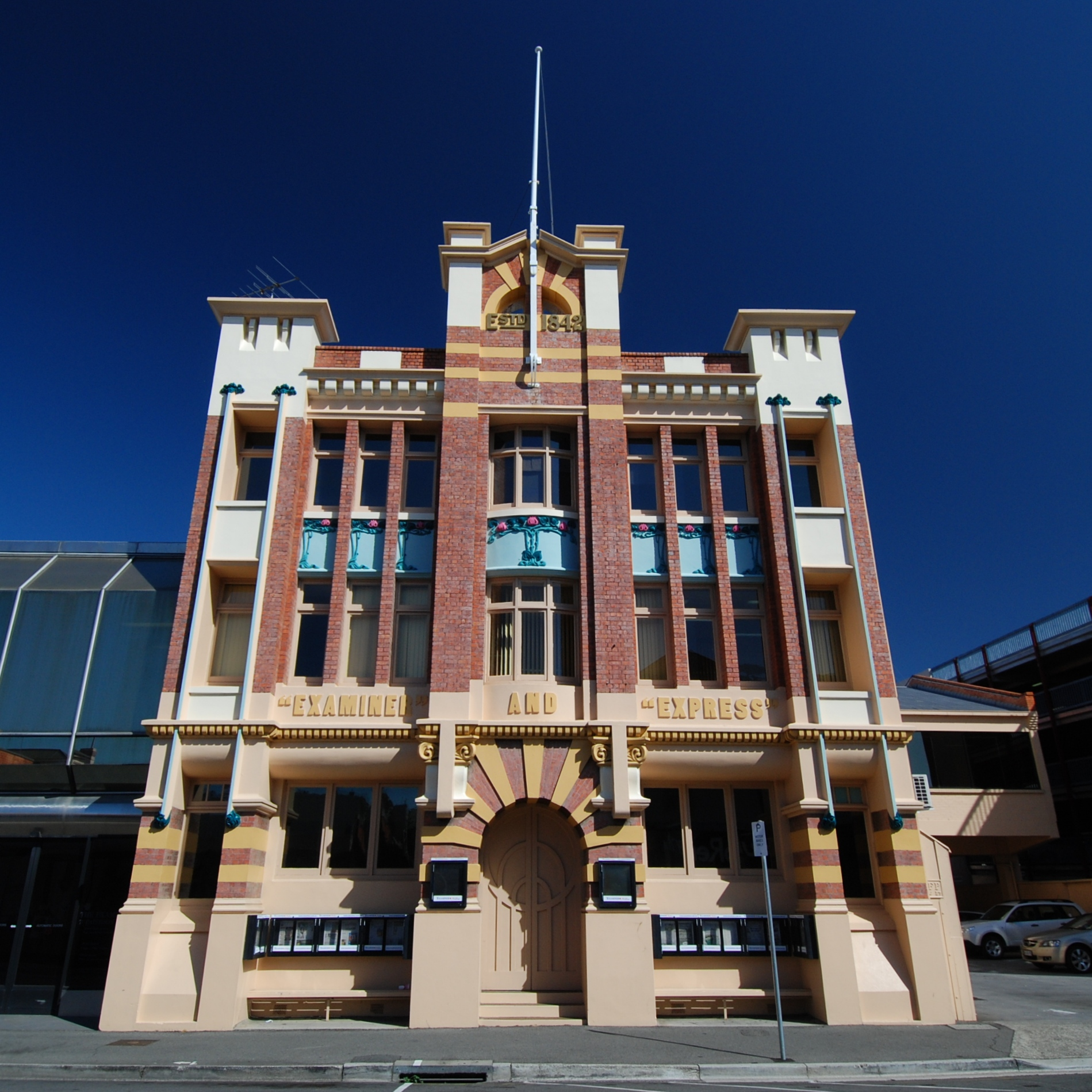
The Examiner building on Paterson Street near the West Paterson Street Multi Storey Car Park in 2010

There are multiple landmarks on Paterson Street, such as The Examiner building. Prior to 25 May, 2015, The Examiner moved out of the original building that the newspaper company was in the building. The Examiner moved on Cimitiere Street in a office building called 113 Cimitiere House.

=== National Theatre ===
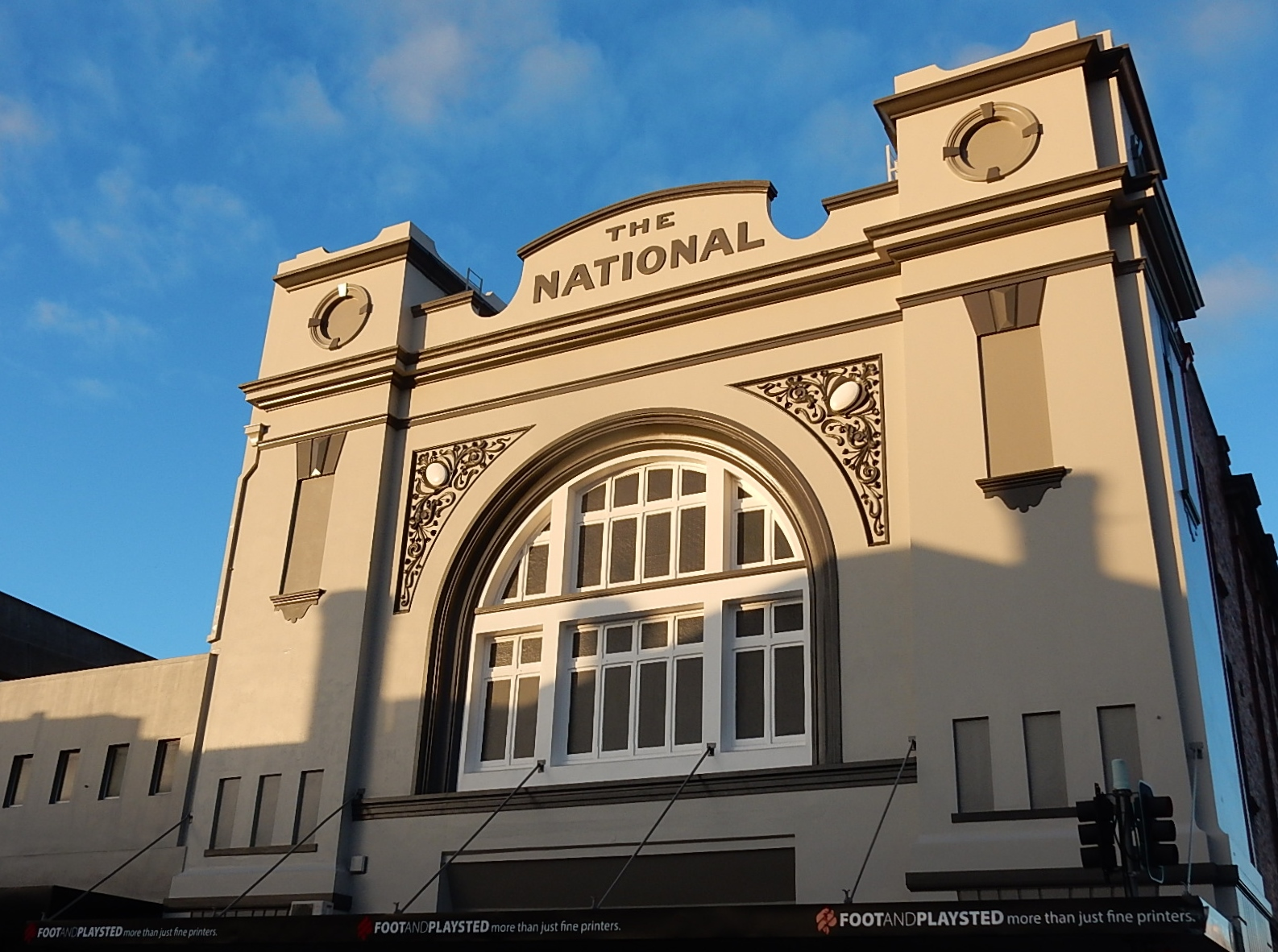
The National Theatre in 2015

The National Theatre is a former theatre located on Charles Street, and Paterson Street. It was formally opened on 25 September 1915 by Mayor Alderman Percy Hart. World-renowned pianist Winifred Atwell gave the final performance at the theatre on 14 November 1970. The building was sold to the printing company Foot & Playsted.

== Car parks ==
=== Multi Storey Car Parks ===
Paterson Street is known for the two Multi Storey Car Parks, located 360 metres a part from the West Paterson Street Multi Storey Car Park, and the East Paterson Street Multi Storey Car Park.

=== Paterson Street East Car Park ===
Paterson Street East Car Park was built in 1981 containing three levels, and ground level, with a lift, and two stairwells. The Multi Storey Car Park hasn't received much changes throughout the years besides a paint job on the front of the multi storey car park that was added in March 2024.

=== Paterson Street West Car Park ===
The Paterson Street West Car Park was built in October 1996, typically having more features then the Paterson Street East Car Park, such as a Baby Station room, two stairwells, and one lift. The Lift is directly near the stairwell while the second stairwell is possibly meant to be a fire escape stairwell. The multi storey car park is built in a way where each level has a slight tilt, making it less wider but more longer with a flat section when completing each level of the multi storey car park which has steel columns in each level, and steel columns every two to three car parking spaces as the support legs. The more higher each level is, metal wires are put on the outside of the red railings, possibly for safety to prevent falling or to prevent suicide. The Paterson Street West Car Park has received more changes then the East Car Park, as changing the front of the multi storey car park in the 2010s, removing the semi grey round column thing on the front of the multi storey car park. In 2021, the Launceston City Council replaced the old Orange baby change rooms to a more comforting-like home baby change room.

== See also ==
- List of highways in Launceston, Tasmania
