= Grindelwald, Tasmania =

Grindelwald
- Town
- Coordinates: 41°21′S 147°00′E
- Country: Australia
- State: Tasmania
- Region: Launceston
- LGA: West Tamar Council
- Location: 16 km (9.9 mi) NW of Launceston; 25 km (16 mi) SE of Beaconsfield
- Established: 1980s

Government
  - State electorate: Bass
  - Federal division: Bass
- Elevation: 190 m (620 ft)

Population
  - Total: 1,037 (SAL 2021)
- Postcode: 7277
Localities around Grindelwald
Rosevears	Rosevears	Rosevears
Bridgenorth	Grindelwald	Rosevears, Legana
Bridgenorth	Legana	Legana

Grindelwald is a rural/residential locality in the local government area (LGA) of West Tamar in the Launceston LGA region of Tasmania. The locality is about 25 kilometres (16 mi) south-east of the town of Beaconsfield. The 2016 census recorded a population of 965 for the state suburb of Grindelwald.

Grindelwald is the final stop of the annual TasGas cycling challenge.

== History ==
Grindelwald was gazetted as a locality in 1983. It is named after a village in Switzerland. It is a small town just north of Launceston, developed in the style of a Swiss village by Roelf Vos, a Dutch immigrant to Tasmania, after he sold his "Roelf Vos" supermarket chain to the Woolworths conglomerate. It was built around an artificial lake, on the edge of which sits the 40 hectare Tamar Valley Resort, which shares the Swiss architectural style. The suburb began construction in 1980, and the resort opened in 1989.

In November 2013, it was announced that the town would be the site of a $103 million eco-tourism project by developer Mike Dean. However this site at Craggy Ridge has now been subdivided into 15 lots.

== Geography ==
Muddy Creek forms the southern boundary.

== Road infrastructure ==
Route A7 (West Tamar Highway) runs along the north-east boundary.
