= Blackwall, Tasmania =

Blackwall
- Town
- Coordinates: 41°18′S 146°58′E
- Country: Australia
- State: Tasmania
- Region: Launceston
- LGA: West Tamar
- Location: 221 km (137 mi) N of Hobart; 24 km (15 mi) NW of Launceston; 2 km (1.2 mi) E of Exeter; 21 km (13 mi) SE of Beaconsfield

Government
  - State electorate: Bass
  - Federal division: Bass

Population
  - Total: 270 (2016)
- Postcode: 7275
Localities around Blackwall
Gravelly Beach	Gravelly Beach	Tamar River
Exeter	Blackwall	Tamar River
Lanena	Lanena	Tamar River

Blackwall is a rural locality in the local government area (LGA) of West Tamar in the Launceston LGA region of Tasmania, Australia. The locality is about 21 kilometres (13 mi) south-east of the town of Beaconsfield. The 2016 census recorded a population of 270 for the state suburb of Blackwall. It is a small town located near Gravelly Beach on the western side of the Tamar River, north of Launceston.

== History ==
Named after Blackwall on the River Thames in England, it was likewise a noted shipbuilding centre. The second-largest ship built in Tasmania during the 19th century, the 547-ton barque Harpley, was launched here in 1847. Blackwall was gazetted as a locality in 1966. Lanena Post Office opened on 1 April 1911, was renamed Blackwall in 1968, and closed in 1975.

== Geography ==
The waters of the Tamar River estuary form the eastern boundary. Stony Brook forms the northern boundary.

== Road infrastructure ==
Route C728 (Gravelly Beach Road) passes through from south-west to north-east.
