= Tamar Valley =

Tamar Valley may refer to:

- Tamar Valley, England, in Devon and Cornwall in the south of England, UK
- Tamar Valley, Tasmania, on the Tamar River in the north of Tasmania, Australia
- Tamar Valley, Slovenia, in Triglav National Park in northwestern Slovenia
