= Legana =

Town in the West Tamar in Tasmania

- Town
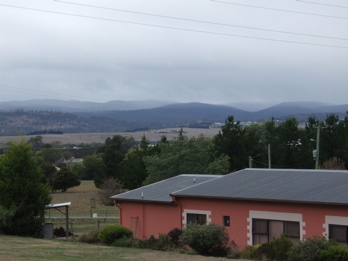
- View of Legana from Bridgenorth Road

- Coordinates: 41°22′0″S 147°3′0″E
- Country: Australia
- State: Tasmania
- Region: Launceston
- LGA: West Tamar
- Location: 12 km (7.5 mi) from Launceston; 32 km (20 mi) SE of Beaconsfield

Government
  - State electorate: Bass
  - Federal division: Bass

Population
  - Total: 4,029 (2016 census)
- Time zone: UTC+10 (AEST)
  - Summer (DST): UTC+11 (AEDT)
- Postcode: 7277
Localities around Legana
Grindelwald	Grindelwald, Rosevears	Tamar River
Bridgenorth	Legana	Tamar River
Riverside	Riverside	Tamar River

Legana is a rural and residential locality in the local government area (LGA) of West Tamar in the Launceston LGA region of Tasmania. The locality is about 32 kilometres (20 mi) south-east of the town of Beaconsfield. The 2021 census recorded a population of 4,769 for the state suburb of Legana. It is 12 kilometres north of Tasmania's second largest city, Launceston. It is adjacent to Riverside, Bridgenorth, Grindelwald and Rosevears.

The name "Legana" is based on the Palawa word for "fresh water" since it is at the point where the Tamar River becomes fresh water. There is currently a homestead called "Freshwater" which was adjacent to a private jetty where early settlers traded with the local natives. This homestead, in Nobelius Drive, now operates as a Bed and Breakfast accommodation house.

Legana is also the name of a comparatively little-known apple variety bred and grown at Legana. Leganas were developed in the early 1940s by James Bulman of Legana by crossing the Democrat (Tasma) and Delicious varieties. They are bright red apples, with a shape similar to Delicious with a smooth crown and the colour of a Democrat. Leganas have been described as a very good eating apple, sweet and nutty with dense, crisp, juicy white to yellow flesh.

== History ==
After European settlement, Legana was initially a rural town made up of dairy farms, apple orchards, and cattle grazing. Most of the residences were originally located near the Tamar River with housing developments built nearer to the West Tamar Highway. Legana was also originally called Legana Estate. Legana was gazetted as a locality in 1963.

== Geography ==
The waters of the Tamar River estuary form the north-eastern, eastern and south-eastern boundaries.

== Road infrastructure ==
The West Tamar Highway (Route A7) passes through from south-east to north-west. The stretch of Route A7 that passes through Legana has been upgraded to 2 lanes in each direction. Route C732 (Bridgenorth Road) starts at an intersection with A7 and runs west until it exits. Route C733 (Rosevears Drive) starts at an intersection with A7 and runs north until it exits.

== Community ==
Like most smaller rural townships, sporting clubs play an important part of the social life of Legana. Most of the community facilities are located within a community precinct which accommodates the Legana Cricket Club who compete in the TCL cricket competition running two teams, the Legana Tennis Club, and children's community playground. Near the playground the council is planning to build a bicycle dirt jump park for the local youths to ride their bikes. The memorial hall is near to this precinct. Legana has a Youth Group run by the West Tamar Council which is held at the memorial hall, allowing the youths to join in afterschool activities and games.

The Legana shopping center, anchored by a Woolworths supermarket, hosts a number of retail and food businesses. Prominent among these is a KFC, hairdresser, chemist, post office, Banjos Bakery, the Reject Shop, Salvation Army Store. and an EG Ampol petrol station (Formerly Caltex Woolworths).

Legana Fire Brigade consists of a group of enthusiastic volunteers who provide the community with a fire protection service equipped to respond to both structure and vegetation fires, car accidents, and fire alarms. Legana Fire Brigade was formed soon after the 1967 Tasmanian fires. Legana Fire Brigade's first piece of equipment was a tanker trailer, purchased by the then Beaconsfield Council under a Rural Fires Board subsidy scheme, and housed at the Brigade Captain's property. At about this time the Legana area began to change from one of apple and pear orchards and dairy farming to a rural residential nature with a sub-division at Freshwater Point. As a result, the Council provided a four-wheel drive medium tanker which again was housed at the Brigade Captain's. As Legana's population grew the existing members felt that the Fire Commission should provide a more suitable shed which was built in the early 1980s. The members went further however and after much hard work, fund-raising and lobbying they were able to ensure that a meeting room and office were incorporated into the new station that was finally opened in 1985. The station was located on the old Freshwater Point Road but the developments of Grindelwald, Rosevears, Danbury Park and the general expansion of Legana itself led to plans being discussed in 1996 for a larger replacement station in a more central location.

Churches in Legana include the Legana Christian Church, in Gerrard Close, the Legana Uniting Church at 979 West Tamar Highway, and the Free Reformed Church in Outreach Drive.

The vineyard of Velo wines at 755 West Tamar Highway was first planted with Cabernet Sauvignon in 1966 and through its former owner Graham Wiltshire played an important role in the development of the Tasmanian wine industry. Further information about this vineyard is available in a 2012 thesis by Anthony Walker.

In 2024, the Tasmanian Government built a primary school for 350 students at Legana, and partnered with the West Tamar Council to include a community sports precinct beside the school. The primary school and community sports facilities are co-located at 612 West Tamar Highway after a joint acquisition of 7.2 hectares of land by the Department of Education and the West Tamar Council.

== Bus services ==
All passenger and school bus services to and from Legana are run by Manions' Coaches. The "Legana Loop" route travels to and from Launceston. School buses run to Riverside Primary and Riverside High Schools, as well as numerous private schools around Launceston. Other services from further up the West Tamar stop at either Legana Grove or Muddy Creek Road/West Tamar Highway stations. The Legana Loop (780/782) services run from Launceston Interchange D2 stop to the Legana Loop, via Riverside. They run throughout a loop through northern Legana, with some services deviating up Nobelius Drive. Services passing through or stopping in Legana are the: 780 Launceston to Legana Loop, 782 Launceston to Legana Loop - incl. Nobelius Drive, 784 Launceston to Rowella, 785 Launceston to Exeter, 787 Launceston to Beaconsfield, 788 Launceston to Beauty Point. All of these services are part of the Northern Regional Network, and can be paid for by cash, coin, or by Manions' smartcard.

== Local government ==
Legana is apart of the West Tamar Council.
