= St John Street, Launceston =

Street in Launceston, Tasmania, Australia

St John Street
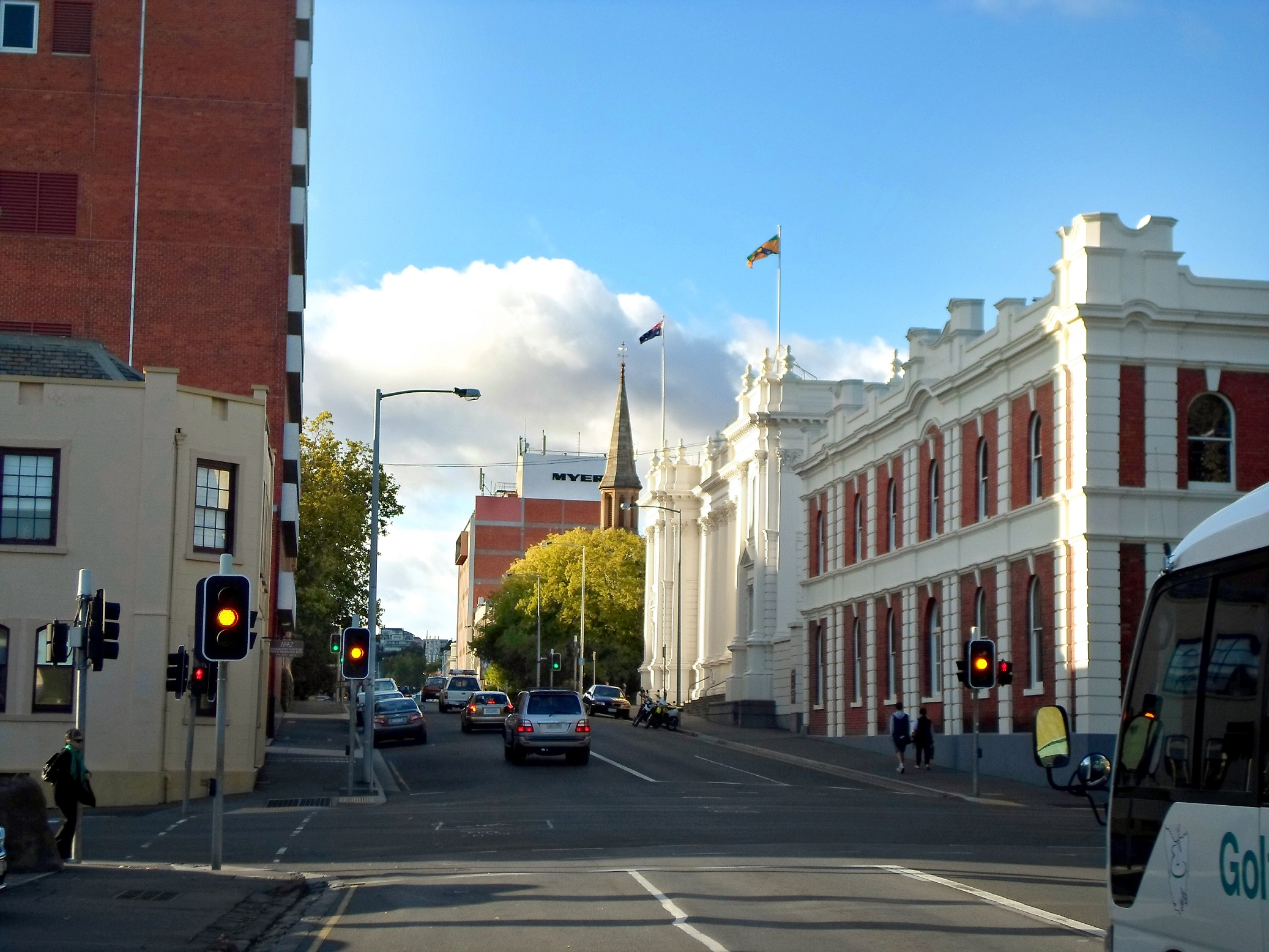
- View of St John Street looking south from between Cimitier and William Streets
- Coordinates: 41.43685°S 147.138486°E

General information
- Type: Street
- Location: Launceston

Major junctions
- North end: Esplanade
- Cimitiere Street A3 Paterson Street Brisbane Street A3 York Street
- South end: Howick Street

St John Street is a main north-south street located in the city of Launceston, Tasmania. St John Street starts at the Esplanade (former Queens Wharf) and runs roughly SSE for 1.8 km to where it terminates on Howick Street on the border with South Launceston. St John Street serves as one of two 'high streets' in the city and runs past many of the city's most iconic and important buildings. The street is notably broken twice in its southernmost length between Frankland and Howick Street where the street runs over a ridge whereby the terrain was too steep for vehicular traffic to use safely resulting in portions of the street being utilized as pedestrian only reserves and only accessible to vehicles via French Street.

== Important landmarks ==
St John Street runs past many of Launceston's most iconic and historically significant buildings and landmarks including:

- Commissariat Store
- Cornwall Square Transit Center
- City Hall
- Telstra Exchange
- Post Office
- Civic Square
- St Andrew's Kirk
- Public Chambers
- Myers Building (former Cox Bros Department Store)
- Former Mercury Building
- Quadrant Mall
- Crabtree's Chambers
- Launceston Synagogue
- Prince's Square
- St John's Church and rectory
- Chalmers Church and Hall
- Nelumie House

== Major intersections ==
- Esplanade
- Cimitier Street
- Cameron Street
- A3 Paterson Street
- Brisbane Street
- A3 York Street
- Elizabeth Street
- Frederick Street
- Canning Street
- Balfour Street
- Frankland Street
- French Street
- Howick Street
