= Swan Point =

Swan Point may refer to -

== Places ==
- Swan Point, Alaska archaeological site, United States
- Swan Point, Maryland, United States
- Swan Point Cemetery located in Providence, Rhode Island, United States
- Swan Point, Tasmania, a locality in Australia

== Ships ==
- SS Swan Point, a British cargo ship in service 1946-49
