= Birralee, Tasmania =

Birralee
- Town
- Coordinates: 41°23′51″S 146°48′45″E
- Country: Australia
- State: Tasmania
- Region: Launceston
- LGA: Meander Valley, West Tamar
- Location: 20 km (12 mi) N of Westbury

Government
  - State electorates: Bass; Lyons
  - Federal divisions: Bass; Lyons

Population
  - Total: 182 (2016 census)
- Postcode: 7303
Localities around Birralee
Frankford	Glengarry	Glengarry
Reedy Marsh	Birralee	Bridgenorth
Reedy Marsh	Westbury	Selbourne

Birralee is a locality and small rural settlement in the local government areas of Meander Valley and West Tamar, in the Launceston region of Tasmania. It is located about 20 kilometres (12 mi) north of the town of Westbury. Black Sugarloaf Creek, a tributary of the Meander River, forms part of the southern boundary, and part of the eastern boundary runs parallel to Four Springs Creek. The 2016 census determined a population of 182 for the state suburb of Birralee.

== History ==
Originally called Black Sugarloaf, the name of the locality was changed at the request of locals. A mountain in the locality is named Black Sugarloaf.

== Road infrastructure ==
The B72 route (Birralee Road) runs north from the Bass Highway (National Highway 1(Route)) through the locality, and from there provides access to many areas of northern Tasmania.
