= Rosevears =

Rosevears may refer to:

- Rosevears, Tasmania, a town in northern Tasmania, Australia
- The electoral division of Rosevears, an electoral division for the Tasmanian Legislative Council

== See also ==
- Rosevear, Isles of Scilly, an uninhabited island in England
- Rosevear, Mawgan in Meneage, a hamlet in Cornwall, England
- Rosevear, Treverbyn, a hamlet in Cornwall, England
