= Lanena, Tasmania =

Lanena Tasmania
- Coordinates: 41°18′52″S 146°57′54″E
- Population: 320 (2016 census)
- Postcode(s): 7275
- Location: 24 km (15 mi) NW of Launceston
- LGA(s): West Tamar
- Region: Western Tamar Valley
- State electorate(s): Bass
- Federal division(s): Bass
Localities around Lanena:
Exeter	Blackwall	Tamar River
Exeter	Lanena	Tamar River
Exeter	Rosevears	Rosevears

Lanena is a locality and small rural community in the local government area of West Tamar, in the Western Tamar Valley region of Tasmania. It is located about 24 kilometres (15 mi) north-west of the town of Launceston. The Tamar River forms the north-eastern and eastern boundaries. The 2016 census determined a population of 320 for the state suburb of Lanena.

== History ==
Originally known as “Blackwell”, the locality name is derived from an Aboriginal word meaning “day”.

== Road infrastructure ==
The C733 route (Rosevears Drive) intersects with the West Tamar Highway, which passes through the locality from south-east to north-west. It runs south-east through the locality to Rosevears.
