= Notley Hills, Tasmania =

Notley Hills Tasmania
- Coordinates: 41°07′34″S 146°47′14″E
- Population: 46 (2016 census)
- Postcode(s): 7275
- Location: 24 km (15 mi) NW of Launceston
- LGA(s): West Tamar
- Region: Launceston
- State electorate(s): Bass
- Federal division(s): Bass
Localities around Notley Hills:
Glengarry	Glengarry	Glengarry, Exeter
Glengarry	Notley Hills	Bridgenorth
Bridgenorth	Bridgenorth	Bridgenorth

Notley Hills is a rural locality in the local government area of West Tamar in the Launceston region of Tasmania. It is located about 24 kilometres (15 mi) north-west of the town of Launceston. The 2016 census determined a population of 46 for the state suburb of Notley Hills.

== History ==
The area was originally known as Foresters Hill. Notley Hills was gazetted as a locality in 1966.

== Geography ==
Notley Fern Gorge State Reserve is within the locality.

== Road infrastructure ==
The C731 route (Notley Gorge Road / Notley Hills Road) runs through from south-east to north.
