= Exeter High School =

Exeter High School is the name of several high schools, including:

In Australia:

- Exeter High School (Tasmania)

In the United States (listed alphabetically by state):

- Exeter Union High School in Exeter, California
- Exeter High School (New Hampshire) in Exeter, New Hampshire
- Exeter Township Senior High School in Reading, Pennsylvania
