= Flowery Gully, Tasmania =

Flowery Gully Tasmania
- Coordinates: 41°14′16″S 146°49′45″E
- Population: 87 (2016 census)
- Postcode(s): 7270
- Location: 43 km (27 mi) NW of Launceston
- LGA(s): West Tamar
- Region: Western Tamar Valley
- State electorate(s): Bass
- Federal division(s): Bass
Localities around Flowery Gully:
Beaconsfield	Beaconsfield	Sidmouth
Beaconsfield	Flowery Gully	Sidmouth
Holwell	Winkleigh	Winkleigh

Flowery Gully is a locality and small rural community in the local government area of West Tamar, in the Western Tamar Valley region of Tasmania. It is located about 43 kilometres (27 mi) north-west of the town of Launceston. The 2016 census determined a population of 87 for the state suburb of Flowery Gully.

== Road infrastructure ==
The C717 route (Flowery Gully Road) runs west from the West Tamar Highway and passes through the locality from south to north before returning to the highway.
