= West Tamar Highway =

Highway in Tasmania, Australia

West Tamar Highway Tasmania
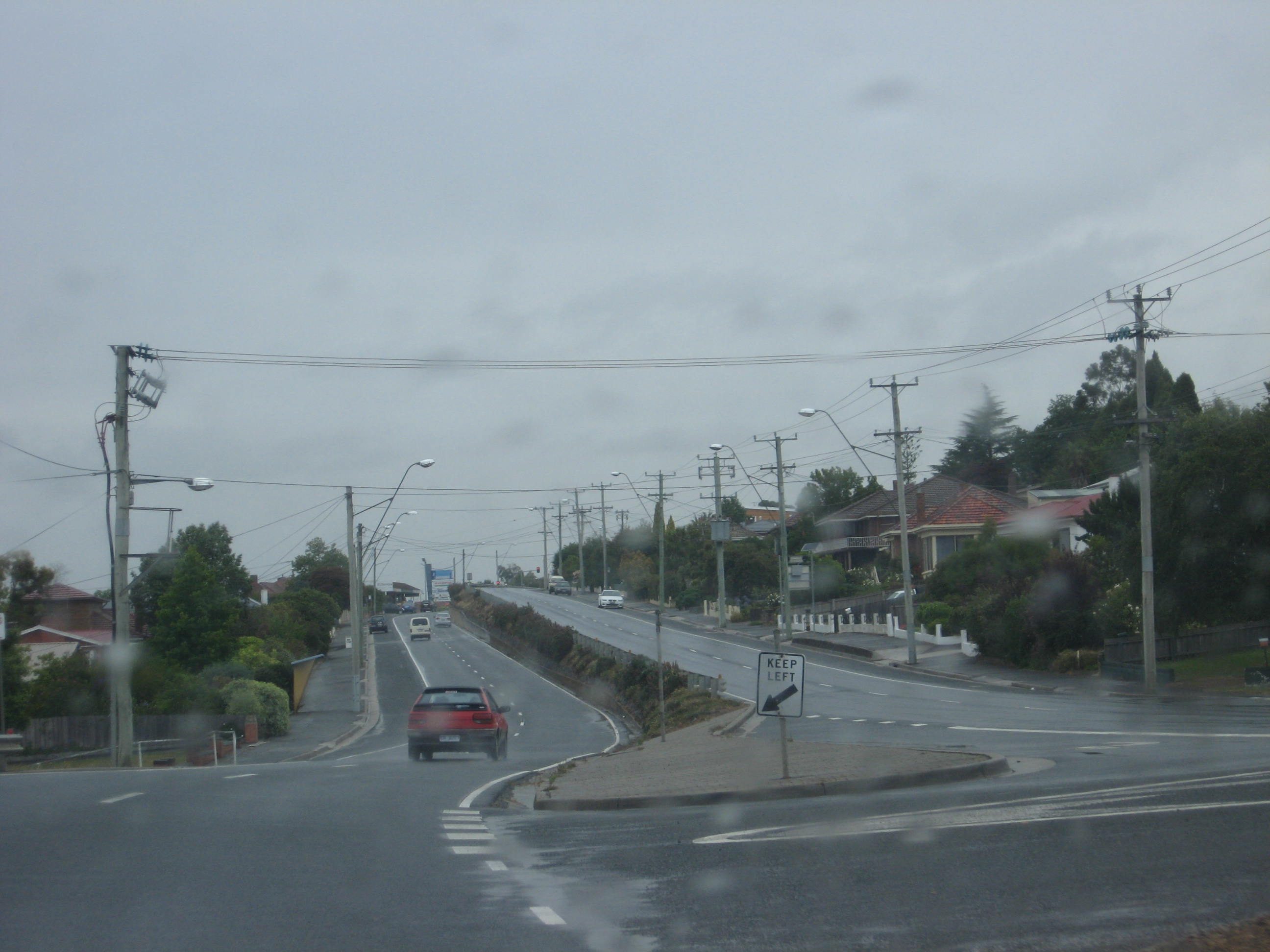
- The West Tamar Highway facing south east in January 2008
- Coordinates: 41.4399547°S 147.1340950°E 41.4411116°S 147.1349737°E (South end); 41.0864884°S 146.7437903°E (North end)

General information
- Type: Highway
- Length: 65.2 km (41 mi)
- Route number(s): A7; Launceston – Greens Beach
- Former route number: State Route 9

Major junctions
- South end: Wellington Street / East Tamar Highway; Wellington Street / East Tamar Highway; York Street; Brisbane Street; Launceston, Tasmania
- Bathurst Street / East Tamar Highway; Bathurst Street / East Tamar Highway; Frankford Road; Batman Highway
- North end: Greens Beach Road; Gardners Road; Greens Beach, Tasmania

Location(s)
- Major settlements: Riverside, Legana, Exeter, Beaconsfield, Kelso

Highway system
- Highways in Australia; National Highway • Freeways in Australia; Highways in Tasmania

The West Tamar Highway is a highway in Tasmania, Australia. It covers the western edge of the Tamar River, from Launceston to the beach town of Greens Beach.

It is labelled as route A7, but prior to 1980 was signed as State Route 9.

== Upgrades ==
In March 2006, 3 kilometres (1.9 mi) of highway was turned into a dual carriageway with a speed limit of 100 km/h (62 mph) with cable barriers on the median strip and slip lanes.

In 2024, roadworks began between Acropolis Drive to the roundabout at Legana providing a dual carriageway with two pedestrian crossings with traffic lights and a roundabout connecting Bridgenorth Road (C732) with a speed limit of 70 km/h (43 mph); roadworks began between early 2024 and finished on April or May 2026.

== Route description ==
=== Launceston to Legana ===
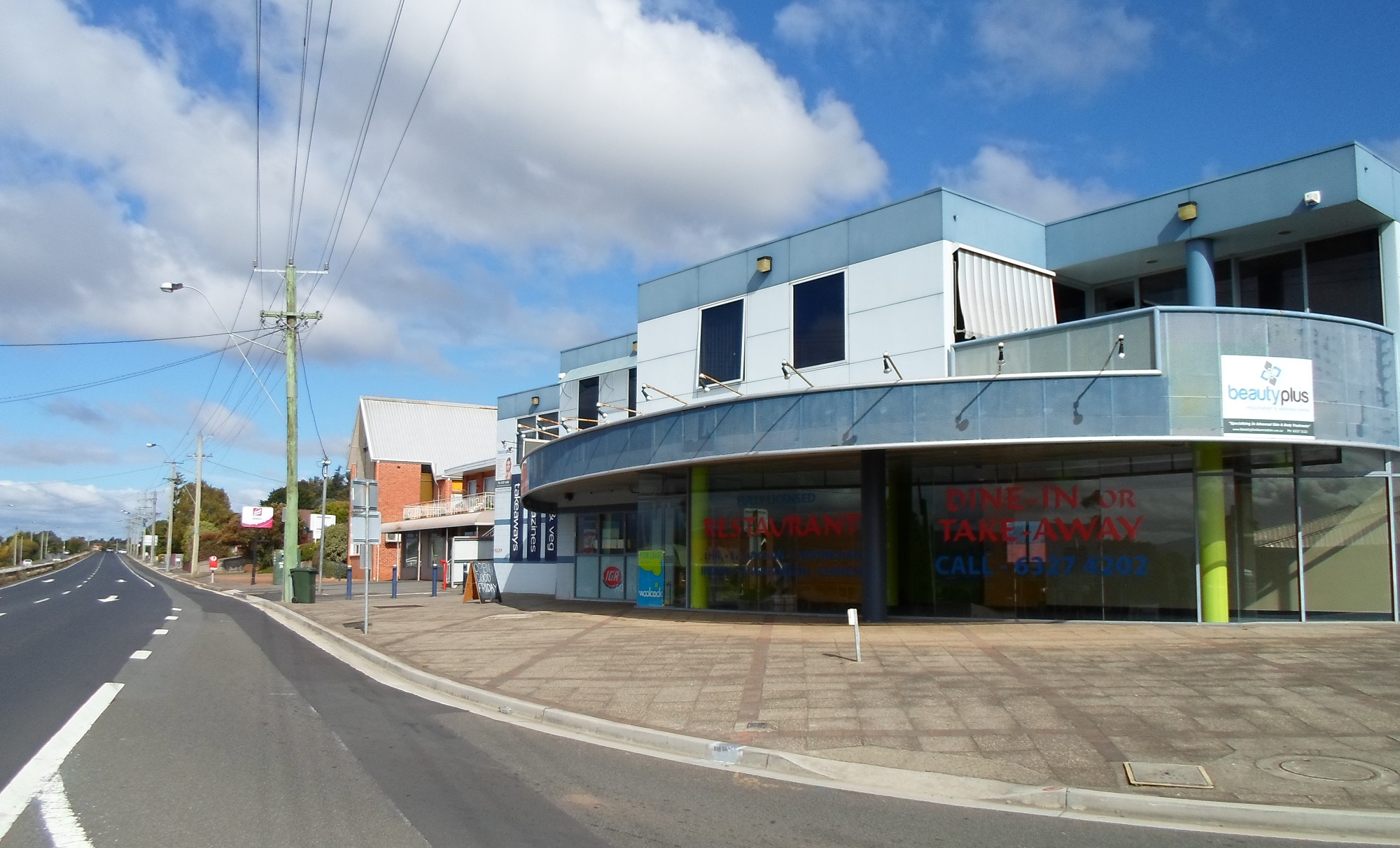
The West Tamar Highway in Riverside

The highway starts in the Launceston CBD which runs on York Street and Brisbane Street. The highway then leaves the CBD and goes on the Paterson Bridge going over the South Esk River, and up through some parts of Trevallyn then to Riverside. The highway goes through a few intersections then leaves onto a dual carriageway then goes on a roundabout but the dual carriageway still continues but with pedestrian crossings with traffic lights. The dual carriageway ends on a roundabout in Legana.

=== Legana to Beaconsfield ===
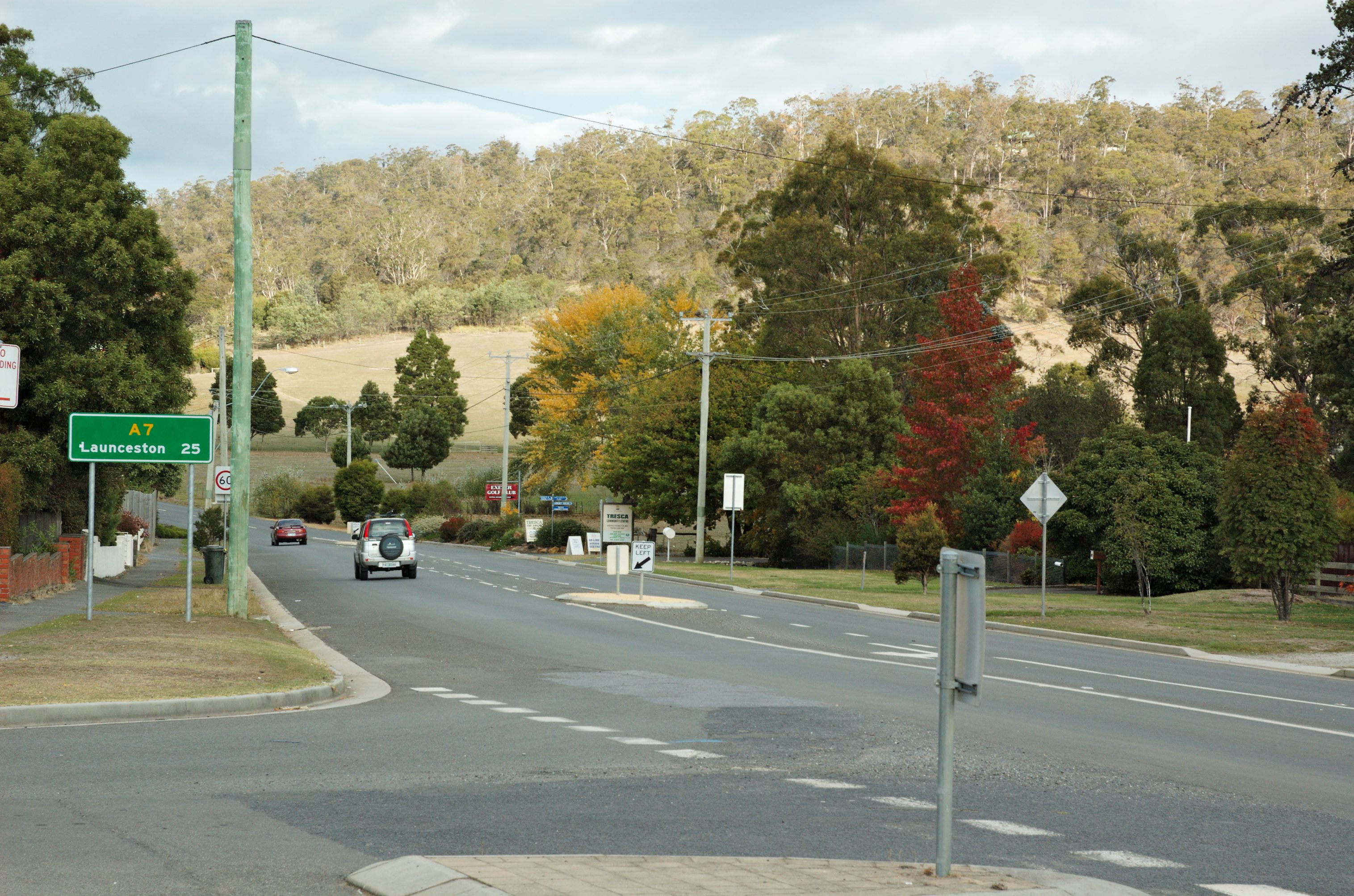
The West Tamar Highway in Exeter

The entire road is rural with only a few overtaking lane opportunities along the way going through major settlements. The highway goes through major settlement Exeter.

=== Beaconsfield to Greens Beach ===
The West Tamar Highway in Beaconsfield

The highway has no overtaking lane opportunities from Beaconsfield to Greens Beach. It goes through Beauty Point and major settlement Kelso. The highway then goes through bushes until finishing into Greens Beach.

== Major intersections ==
Four shielded routes terminate at the intersections of streets in the Launceston CBD. Because all the involved streets are one-way each route has separate inbound and outbound termini. One of these routes is the West Tamar Highway. Distances from each terminus to a point on the route may not be identical. Those shown below are from the outbound terminus.

LGA	Location	km	mi	Destinations	Notes
Launceston	Launceston	0	0.0	Midland Highway (Bathurst Street) (National Highway 1) – from southeast to northwest – South Launceston to Launceston / York Street from Tasman Highway (A3) – northeast – Newstead	Southern end of West Tamar Highway. Road proceeds south west as York Street.
South Esk River		0.7– 0.8	0.43– 0.50	The Paterson Bridge	
West Tamar	Riverside	5.6	3.5	Ecclestone Road (C734) – southwest – Riverside, Tasmania Zoo / Windsor Drive – northeast – Windsor Park Sports Complex	
West Tamar	Legana	11.3	7.0	Bridgenorth Road (C732) – southwest – Bridgenorth	
West Tamar	Legana	12.0– 12.1	7.5– 7.5	Freshwater Point Road – northeast – Legana	
West Tamar	Legana	13.5	8.4	Rosevears Drive (C733) – north – Rosevears	
West Tamar	Lanena	21.7	13.5	Rosvears Drive (C733) – southeast – Rosevears	
West Tamar	Lanena, Blackwall, Exeter tripoint	22.5	14.0	Gravelly Beach Road (C728) – northeast – Gravelly Beach	
West Tamar	Exeter	23.8	14.8	Frankford Road (B71) – southwest – Glengarry	
West Tamar	Exeter	23.9	14.9	Winkleigh Road (C717) – northwest – Flowery Gully	
West Tamar	Loira	29.9	18.6	Motor Road (C729) – northeast – Deviot	
West Tamar	Sidmouth	33.1	20.6	Batman Highway (B73) – north – Sidmouth, Batman Bridge	
West Tamar	Sidmouth	34.8	21.6	Spring Hill Road (C725) – northeast – Batman Highway	
West Tamar	Beaconsfield Flowery Gully midpoint	38.5	23.9	Flowery Gully Road (C717) – southwest – Flowery Gully	
West Tamar	Beaconsfield	41.4	25.7	Greens Beach Road (C720) – northwest – York Town	
West Tamar	Beaconsfield	42.0	26.1	Kellys Lookout Road (C715) – southwest – Holwell	
West Tamar	Beaconsfield	52.1	32.4	Greens Beach Road (C720) – southeast – Beaconsfield	West Tamar Highway turns from south west (out of Beauty Point) to north-west (towards Greens Beach)
West Tamar	York Town	54.4	33.8	Bowens Road (C741) – southwest – York Town	
West Tamar	Badger Head, Clarence Point midpoint	55.3	34.4	Badger Head Road (C721) – west – Badger Head	
West Tamar	Badger Head, Clarence Point midpoint	55.4	34.4	Clarence Point Road (C722) – northeast – Clarence Point	
West Tamar	Greens Beach	65.1	40.5	End of highway – road continues as Greens Beach Road	Northern end of West Tamar Highway
1.000 mi = 1.609 km; 1.000 km = 0.621 mi

== See also ==
- List of highways in Launceston, Tasmania
