= Rosevale, Tasmania =

Rosevale Tasmania
- Coordinates: 41°25′12″S 146°55′40″E
- Population: 117 (2016 census)
- Postcode(s): 7292
- Location: 25 km (16 mi) W of Launceston
- LGA(s): Meander Valley, West Tamar
- Region: Launceston
- State electorate(s): Lyons, Bass
- Federal division(s): Lyons, Bass
Localities around Rosevale:
| Glengarry | Bridgenorth | Bridgenorth |
| Selbourne | Rosevale | Bridgenorth |
| Selbourne | Selbourne, Westwood | Westwood |

Rosevale is a rural locality in the local government areas of Meander Valley and West Tamar in the Launceston region of Tasmania. It is located about 25 kilometres (16 mi) west of the town of Launceston. The 2016 census determined a population of 117 for the state suburb of Rosevale.

== History ==
The name was used for a post office in the area from 1875. Rosevale was gazetted as a locality in 1968.

== Geography ==
The locality is mostly cleared farming land, surrounded by timbered areas. Much of the boundary appears to consist of survey lines separating the two land use types.

== Road infrastructure ==
The C732 route (Bridgenorth Road) enters from the north and exits to the south-east. The C734 route (Ecclestone Road) starts at an intersection with C732 on the southern boundary and runs to the north-east before exiting.
