= List of highways in Launceston, Tasmania =

A list of highways, and roads in Launceston, Tasmania

This is a List of highways and roads in Launceston, Tasmania.

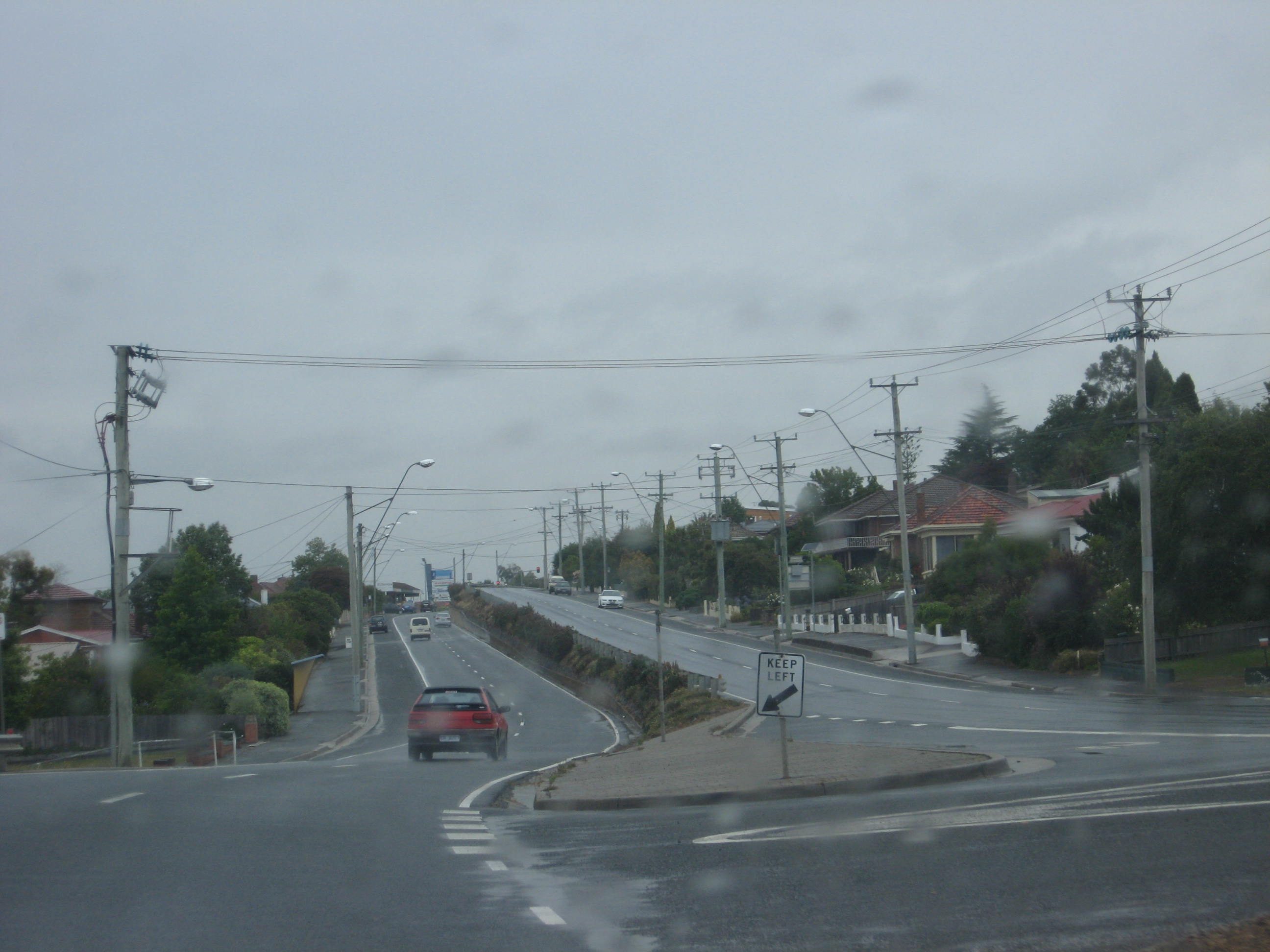
West Tamar Highway

== Highways ==
Midland Highway

Bass Highway

Tasman Highway

West Tamar Highway

East Tamar Highway

== Major streets and roads ==
Elphin Road

Brisbane Street

Paterson Street

York Street

George Street

Tamar Street

Invermay Road (Former East Tamar Highway)

George Town Road (Former East Tamar Highway)

University Way (Former East Tamar Highway)

Hobart Road (Former Midland Highway)

Westbury Road (Former Bass Highway)

Kings Meadows Link / Quarantine Road / Johnston Road / Ables Hill Road
