= Brisbane Street, Launceston =

Street in Launceston, Tasmania

Brisbane Street Tasmania
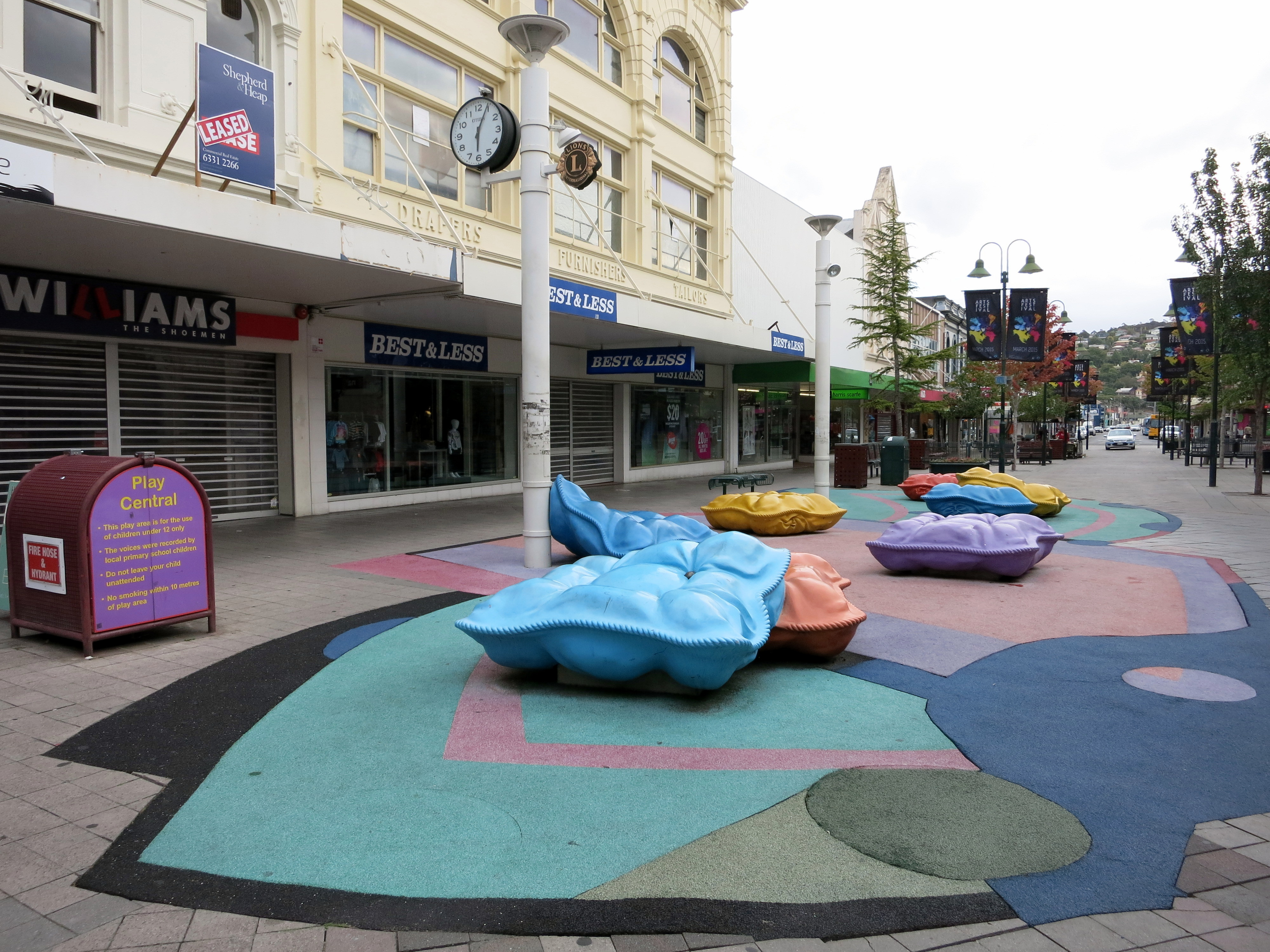
- Brisbane Street Mall in March 2015
- Coordinates: 41.4418721°S 147.1315744°E (West end); 41.4319681°S 147.1474259°E (East end)

General information
- Type: Street
- Length: 2.0 km (1.2 mi)
- Route number(s): A3 / A7
- Former route number: State Route 3 / State Route 9

Major junctions
- West end: A7 West Tamar Highway
- East Tamar Highway; National Highway (Wellington Street); Charles Street; George Street Tamar Street; Elphin Road
- East end: High Street, Launceston

Location(s)
- Region: Launceston

Brisbane Street is the main street of the Launceston CBD and is a one way only for half of the route before being two way only at the ANZ bank on George Street.

== Route ==
Brisbane Street (Red Line)

The street begins on the West Tamar Highway, then goes onto the route number A3, the street goes on the mall (footpath only) and then goes on a one way road, then goes back on the route number A3 and goes past the Princess Theatre and then goes past City Park then goes on a Peanut shaped roundabout and ends on High Street.

== Brisbane Street Mall ==
Prior to 1975, there was only a two way road that was between the shops and department buildings as like Myer (previously Cox Bro's) and other various shops, construction began in 1975 and opened on 11 October 1975 after being established as Australia's very first pedestrian mall.

In July 2017, the Birchalls book store shut down after 173 years of operating in Tasmania and it was australia's oldest book store.

In April 2026, Monopoly released a Launceston limited edition monopoly board game, but a mistake was maken of the Brisbane Street Mall image on the monopoly board not used but rather the Brisbane Queen Street Mall in Queensland.

In 8 August 2026, Mecca Opened Launceston's first MECCA store on Brisbane Street. An estimated 1,000 people lined up around the block as MECCA opened its first Launceston store on 8 August 2026, in the morning.

On 21 September, 2026, the Launceston City Council announced that construction will begin on the Birchalls book store. The council had committed AU$15 Million towards the plan to build Apartments, Play area, Food court and more.

== Incidents ==
In May 2026, CCTV footage found that a flamethrower was used in the brisbane street mall at 1:22 AM allegedly used to light up a fire in the Mall.

== Gallery ==
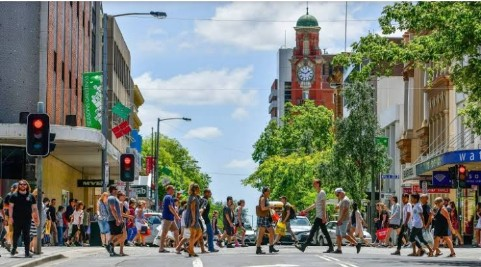
Pedestrians walking from the Brisbane Street Mall to the one way section of Brisbane Street

Brisbane Street Mall in August 2015

== See also ==
- Brisbane Street, Hobart
- List of highways in Launceston, Tasmania
