= Kayena, Tasmania =

Kayena
- Town
- Coordinates: 41°11′17″S 146°53′00″E
- Country: Australia
- State: Tasmania
- Region: Launceston
- LGA: West Tamar
- Location: 10 km (6.2 mi) E of Beaconsfield

Government
  - State electorate: Bass
  - Federal division: Bass

Population
  - Total: 219 (2016 census)
- Postcode: 7270
Localities around Kayena
Tamar River	Rowella	Tamar River
Beaconsfield	Kayena	Tamar River, Sidmouth
Beaconsfield	Sidmouth	Sidmouth

Kayena is a rural locality in the local government area (LGA) of West Tamar in the Launceston LGA region of Tasmania. The locality is about 10 kilometres (6.2 mi) east of the town of Beaconsfield. The 2016 census recorded a population of 219 for the state suburb of Kayena.

== History ==
Kayena was gazetted as a locality in 1967. It had previously been named Richmond Hill. Kayena is believed to be an Aboriginal word for "tongue".

== Geography ==
The waters of the Tamar River Estuary form the north-western boundary and part of the eastern.

== Road infrastructure ==
Route C724 (Rowella Road) passes through from south to north.
