= Holwell, Tasmania =

Holwell Tasmania
- Coordinates: 41°17′22″S 146°46′46″E
- Population: 65 (2016 census)
- Postcode(s): 7275
- Location: 43 km (27 mi) NW of Launceston
- LGA(s): West Tamar, Latrobe
- Region: Launceston, North-west and west
- State electorate(s): Bass, Braddon
- Federal division(s): Bass, Braddon
Localities around Holwell:
Beaconsfield	Beaconsfield	Flowery Gully
Frankford	Holwell	Flowery Gully
Frankford	Frankford	Winkleigh

Holwell is a locality and small rural community in the local government areas of West Tamar and Latrobe, in the Launceston and North-west and west regions of Tasmania. It is located about 43 kilometres (27 mi) north-west of the town of Launceston. A small part of the locality is in the Latrobe Council area. The 2016 census determined a population of 65 for the state suburb of Holwell.

== History ==
Holwell Post Office opened in 1891 and closed in 1970. Early public buildings included a Wesleyan chapel and a school.

== Road infrastructure ==
The C715 route (Holwell Road) runs south-west from the West Tamar Highway and passes through the locality to an intersection with the B71 route.
