= Rowella, Tasmania =

Rowella Tasmania
- Coordinates: 41°10′13″S 146°53′39″E
- Population: 170 (2016 census)
- Postcode(s): 7270
- Location: 46 km (29 mi) NW of Launceston
- LGA(s): West Tamar
- Region: Launceston
- State electorate(s): Bass
- Federal division(s): Bass
Localities around Rowella:
Tamar River	Tamar River	Tamar River
Tamar River	Rowella	Tamar River
Kayena	Kayena	Tamar River

Rowella is a rural locality in the local government area of West Tamar in the Launceston region of Tasmania. It is located about 46 kilometres (29 mi) north-west of the town of Launceston. The 2016 census determined a population of 170 for the state suburb of Rowella.

== History ==
The area has been known by various names, and as Rowella since 1912. It was gazetted as a locality in 1967.

== Geography ==
The locality is surrounded on three sides by the Tamar River.

== Road infrastructure ==
The C724 route (Rowella Road / West Bay Road) enters from the south and runs north and then south-east to Rowella village, where it terminates.
