= Swan Point, Tasmania =

Swan Point Tasmania
- Coordinates: 41°17′38″S 147°00′45″E
- Population: 282 (2016 census)
- Postcode(s): 7275
- Location: 22 km (14 mi) SE of Beaconsfield
- LGA(s): West Tamar
- Region: Launceston
- State electorate(s): Bass
- Federal division(s): Bass
Localities around Swan Point:
Tamar River	Tamar River	Tamar River
Robigana	Swan Point	Tamar River
Robigana	Gravelly Beach	Gravelly Beach

Swan Point is a rural locality in the local government area (LGA) of West Tamar in the Launceston LGA region of Tasmania. The locality is about 22 kilometres (14 mi) south-east of the town of Beaconsfield. The 2016 census recorded a population of 282 for the state suburb of Swan Point.

Historically the area has been mostly a summertime shack locality because of health risks from Launceston city's poorly designed sewerage system frequently overflowing untreated sewage throughout winter and early spring. Historical orcharding has left chemical residues present in the soils.

== History ==
Swan Point is a confirmed locality.

Prior to the 1970s, it had substantial apple and pear orcharding. This has left residues of organochlorines, lead, arsenic, mercury and in particular DDT in the soils throughout the region. Lead and arsenic are persistent and become quite problematic when soil is turned over during housing construction excavation. Sewerage treatment by Launceston city 30 km south, is a major problem for the region because the Tamar Valley acts as a conduit and stormwater from rooves of Launceston houses, is plumbed to run into the sewage treatment ponds, making them frequently overflow during any substantial rainfall event.

== Geography ==
The waters of the Tamar River Estuary form the north-western, northern and eastern boundaries.

== Road infrastructure ==
Route C728 (Deviot Road) runs along the south-west boundary. Access to the locality is provided by Paper Beach Road.
