= Selbourne, Tasmania =

Selbourne Tasmania
- Coordinates: 41°25′15″S 146°52′54″E
- Population: 68 (2016 census)
- Postcode(s): 7292
- Location: 29 km (18 mi) W of Launceston
- LGA(s): Meander Valley, West Tamar
- Region: Launceston
- State electorate(s): Lyons, Bass
- Federal division(s): Lyons, Bass
Localities around Selbourne:
| Birralee | Glengarry | Rosevale |
| Birralee, Westbury | Selbourne | Rosevale, Westwood |
| Westbury | Quamby Bend, Hagley | Hagley |

Selbourne is a rural locality in the local government areas of Meander Valley and West Tamar in the Launceston region of Tasmania. It is located about 29 kilometres (18 mi) west of the town of Launceston. The 2016 census determined a population of 68 for the state suburb of Selbourne.

== History ==
The name, with various spellings, is a juxtaposition of Sydney and Melbourne has been used for the area since 1853. Selbourne was gazetted as a locality in 1968.

== Geography ==
The Meander River forms most of the southern and south-eastern boundaries.

== Road infrastructure ==
The C735 route (Selbourne Road) starts at an intersection with B72 (Birralee Road) on the western boundary and runs through to the south-east, where it exits.
