= Roelf Vos =

Dutch Australian businessman (1921–1992)

- Born: 1921; 105 years ago Netherlands
- Died: December 2, 1992 (aged 70–71)
- Citizenship: Australian
- Occupation: Businessman
- Known for: Roelf Vos Supermarkets

Roelf Vos (1921 – 2 December 1992) was a Dutch Australian businessman who established a supermarket chain carrying his name initially in Launceston, and later throughout northern Tasmania. The equivalent in the south of the state was Purity Supermarkets established by Engel Sypkes.

== Early life ==
Born and raised in the Netherlands, Vos was involved in the Dutch resistance during the Second World War. He migrated with his wife and children to Australia in 1951 where he initially worked as a labourer on a wage of $19.

== Career ==
Roelf Vos Supermarkets
- Roelf Vos logo

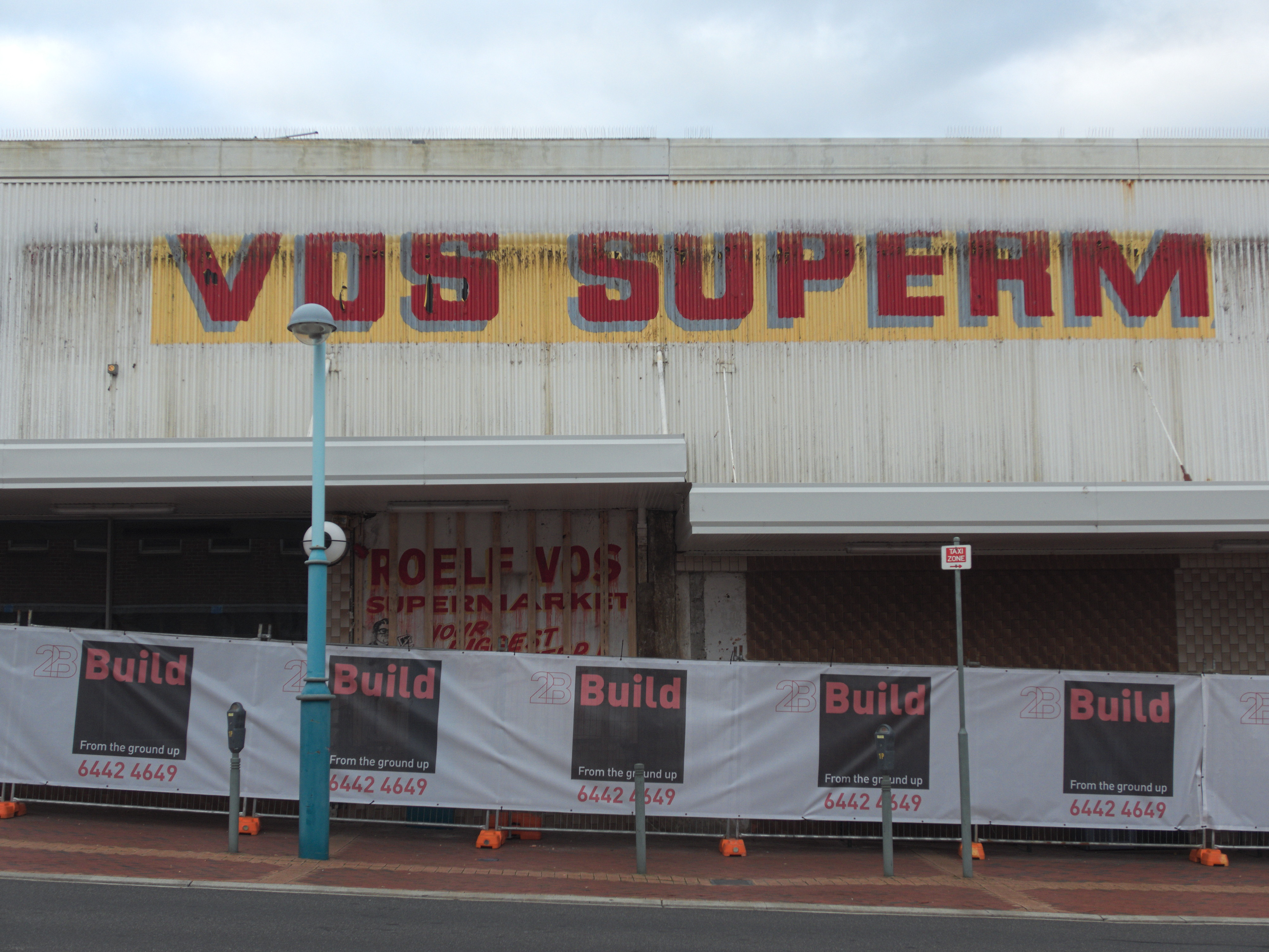
- Old Vos signwriting in Burnie
- Type: Subsidiary
- Industry: Retail
- Founded: 1958; 68 years ago
- Founder: Roelf Vos
- Defunct: 2000; 26 years ago
- Number of locations: 13 stores (1982)
- Area served: Northern Tasmania
- Owner: Woolworths
- Number of employees: 500 (1982)

In 1954, he opened a gift store in Deloraine followed shortly afterward by another in George Town. Around 1958, he rented a small shop in Launceston, a milk bar which he converted into northern Tasmania's first self-service grocery store.

By 1969, he was operating eight supermarkets in Launceston, each with a car park and a combined turnover in 1969 of $3,500,000. In December 1969, he purchased two Moran & Cato shops in Ulverstone and Devonport for $250,000, and was hoping to open two new shops, one of which in Burnie. He ultimately had thirteen supermarkets employing 500 people. In 1982, after he suffered two heart attacks, the supermarket operations were sold to Woolworths, who continued to trade under the Vos name for 20 years. Vos went on to establish the Grindelwald resort in Tasmania, modelled on Grindelwald in Switzerland.

The Vos family retained ownership of the properties, including two shopping centres in the north and north west of Tasmania. They were rebranded as Woolworths in the early 2000s.

At the time of the final loss of the Roelf Vos name, the stores in Launceston included a CBD store (Wellington Street), as well as Newstead, Kings Meadows, Prospect Vale, Riverside and Newnham. The CBD Wellington Street and Newstead stores are now Coles supermarkets, and the Newnham store has closed and is now a City Mission charity store.

The final store to be built under the Roelf Vos name was the Legana store, just north of Launceston. Only opening in 2000, a fitting final store being only a 5 minute drive from Grindelwald.

Roelf Vos supermarkets were colloquially referred to as Vossie's in Tasmania.

== See also ==
- Woolworths Frequent Shopper Club
