= Bridgenorth, Tasmania =

Bridgenorth
- Town
- Coordinates: 41°23′03″S 146°57′08″E
- Country: Australia
- State: Tasmania
- Region: Western Tamar Valley
- LGA: West Tamar
- Location: 22 km (14 mi) NW of Launceston

Government
  - State electorate: Bass
  - Federal division: Bass

Population
  - Total: 373 (2016)
- Postcode: 7277
Localities around Bridgenorth
Notley Hills	Exeter	Grindelwald
Rosevale	Bridgenorth	Legana
Rosevale	Rosevale	Riverside

Bridgenorth is a locality and small rural community in the local government area of West Tamar, in the Western Tamar Valley region of Tasmania. It is located about 22 kilometres (14 mi) north-west of the town of Launceston. A small part of the locality, about 4.5%, is in the Meander Valley Council area. The 2016 census determined a population of 373 for the state suburb of Bridgenorth.

== History ==
The locality is believed to be named for Bridgnorth, Shropshire, a town in England. The name was assigned in 1999 and the boundary with Notley Hills was adjusted in 2006.

== Road infrastructure ==
The C732 route (Bridgenorth Road) runs from the West Tamar Highway, passing through the locality from east to west and providing access to many other localities.
