= Exeter High School (Tasmania) =

School in Tasmania, Australia

Location
- Glen-Ard-Mohr Road; Exeter, Tasmania; Australia; 41°17′58″S 146°57′26″E

Information
- Type: Government comprehensive junior secondary school
- Established: 1909; 117 years ago as Exeter State School
- Status: Open
- School district: Northern
- Educational authority: Department for Education, Children and Young People
- Oversight: Office of Tasmanian Assessment, Standards & Certification
- Principal: Benjamin Frerk
- Teaching staff: 21.9 FTE (2019)
- Years: 7–10
- Gender: Co-educational
- Enrolment: 284 (2019)
- Campus type: Regional
- Website: exeterhigh.education.tas.edu.au

Exeter High School is a government co-educational comprehensive junior secondary school located in Exeter, northern Tasmania, Australia. Established in 1985, the school caters for approximately 300 students from Years 7 to 10. The school is administered by the Department for Education, Children and Young People.

In 2019, student enrolments were 284. The school principal is Benjamin Frerk.

== History ==
The school was established in 1909 as the Exeter State School. Following a merger with other state schools, in 1940 it became the West Tamar Area School. There followed further name changes, to Exeter Area School in 1954 and then to Exeter District High School in 1973. On 5 November 1985 the school was split into primary and secondary schools with the secondary streams forming Exeter High School. The high school was opened in 1985 by the then premier, Robin Gray.

== See also ==
- List of schools in Tasmania
- Education in Tasmania
