= Water fluoridation in the United States =

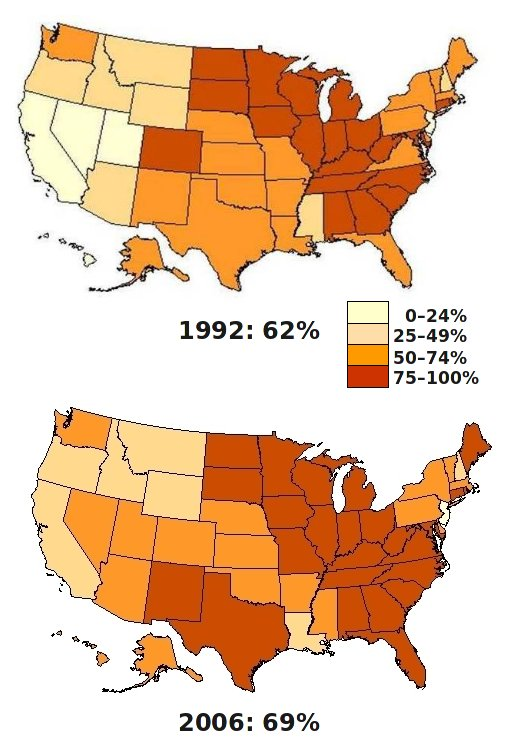
U.S. residents served with community water fluoridation, 1992 and 2006. The percentages are the proportions of the resident population served by public water supplies who are receiving fluoridated water.

Water fluoridation in the United States is common in most states. As of May 2000, 42 of the 50 largest U.S. cities had water fluoridation. On January 25, 1945, Grand Rapids, Michigan, became the first community in the United States to fluoridate its drinking water for the intended purpose of helping to prevent tooth decay.

Fluoridation became an official policy of the U.S. Public Health Service by 1951, and by 1960 water fluoridation had become widely used in the U.S., reaching about 50 million people. By 2006, 69.2% of the U.S. population on public water systems were receiving fluoridated water, amounting to 61.5% of the total U.S. population. Near the end of 2012, 67.1% of the U.S. population were getting water from community water systems (CWS) supplying water that had fluoride at or above recommended levels. Those included the 3.5% of the population that were on CWS with naturally occurring fluoride at or above recommended levels. 74.6% of those on CWS were receiving water with fluoride at or above recommended levels.

U.S. regulations for bottled water do not require disclosing fluoride content. A survey of bottled water in Cleveland and in Iowa, published in 2000, found that most had fluoride levels well below the 1 mg/L level common in tap waters.

On May 7, 2025, Utah officially became the first US state to implement a ban on fluoridation within their water supplies.

== History ==
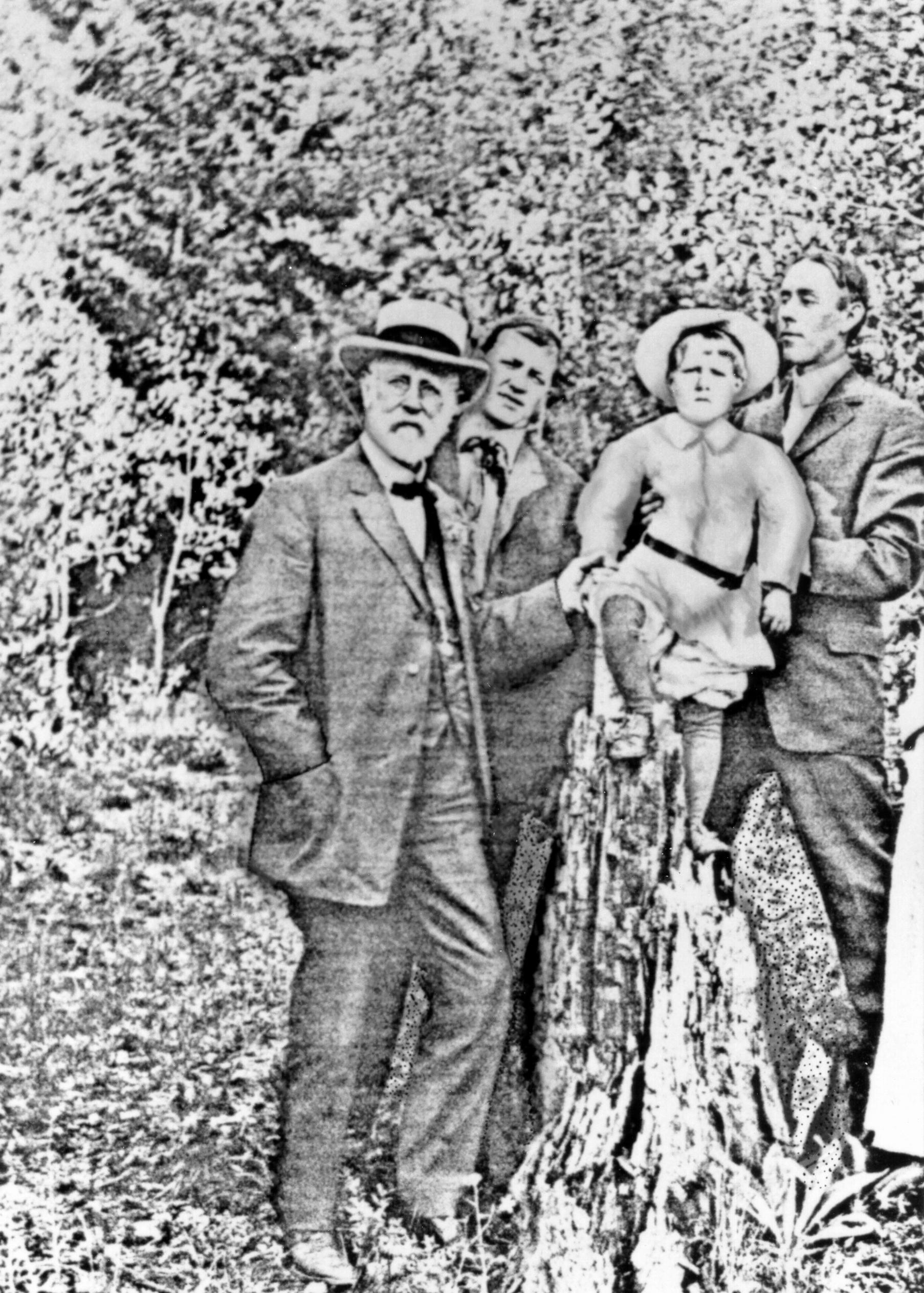
1909 photograph by Frederick McKay of Greene Vardiman Black (left) and Isaac Burton and F.Y. Wilson, studying the Colorado Brown Stain

Community water fluoridation in the United States is partly due to the research of Dr. Frederick McKay, who pressed the dental community for an investigation into what was then known as "Colorado Brown Stain." The condition, now known as dental fluorosis, when in its severe form is characterized by cracking and pitting of the teeth. Of 2,945 children examined in 1909 by Dr. McKay, 87.5% had some degree of stain or mottling. All the affected children were from the Pikes Peak region. Despite the negative impact on the physical appearance of their teeth, the children with stained, mottled and pitted teeth also had fewer cavities than other children. McKay brought this to the attention of Greene Vardiman Black, and Black's interest was followed by greater interest within the dental profession.

Initial hypotheses for the staining included poor nutrition, overconsumption of pork or milk, radium exposure, childhood diseases, or a [calcium] deficiency in the local drinking water. In 1931, researchers from the Aluminum Company of America (ALCOA) concluded that the cause of the Colorado stain was a high concentration of fluoride ions in the region's drinking water (ranging from 2 to 13.7 mg/L) and areas with lower concentrations had no staining (1 mg/L or less). Pikes Peak's rock formations contained the mineral cryolite, one of whose constituents is fluorine. As the rain and snow fell, the resulting runoff water dissolved fluoride which made its way into the water supply.

Dental and aluminum researchers then moved toward determining a relatively safe level of fluoride to be added to water supplies. The research had two goals: (1) to warn communities with a high concentration of fluoride of the danger, initiating a reduction of the fluoride levels in order to reduce incidence rates of fluorosis, and (2) to encourage communities with a low concentration of fluoride in drinking water to add fluoride in order to help prevent tooth decay. By 2006, 69.2% of the U.S. population on public water systems were receiving fluoridated water, amounting to 61.5% of the total U.S. population; 3.0% of the population on public water systems were receiving naturally occurring fluoride.

In April 2015, fluoride levels in the United States were lowered for the first time in 50 years to the minimum recommended level of 0.7ppm, because excess fluoride exposure had become a common issue for children's teeth, visible in the form of white splotches. This decision was based on the results of two national surveys (1999–2004 NHANES) which assessed the prevalence of dental fluorosis, and found that two out of five adolescents had tooth streaking or spottiness on their teeth - an increase of mostly very mild or mild forms.

On September 24, 2024, a federal judge ordered the U.S. Environmental Protection Agency (EPA) to take regulatory action citing the findings of an extensive federal review of many studies published in peer-reviewed scientific and medical journals showing a dosage-dependent negative impact on children's IQs. District Court Judge Edward Chen ruled that the current recommended fluoridation level of 0.7 ppm "poses an unreasonable risk of reduced IQ in children." The judge based his ruling largely on a comprehensive review of the scientific literature by the U.S. National Toxicology Program (NTP), a federal inter-agency program within the U.S. Department of Health & Human Service (HHS). In determining this unreasonable risk under the Toxic Substances Control Act (TSCA), the court relied on pooled benchmark dose (BMD) modeling, which identified a hazard level—or point of departure—where a 1-point drop in a child's IQ is expected for every 0.28 mg/L of fluoride in a pregnant mother's urine. The court noted that because median maternal urinary fluoride levels in the U.S. are approximately 0.8 mg/L, the safety margin required by standard risk assessment protocols is insufficient or non-existent for pregnant populations.

=== Early studies ===
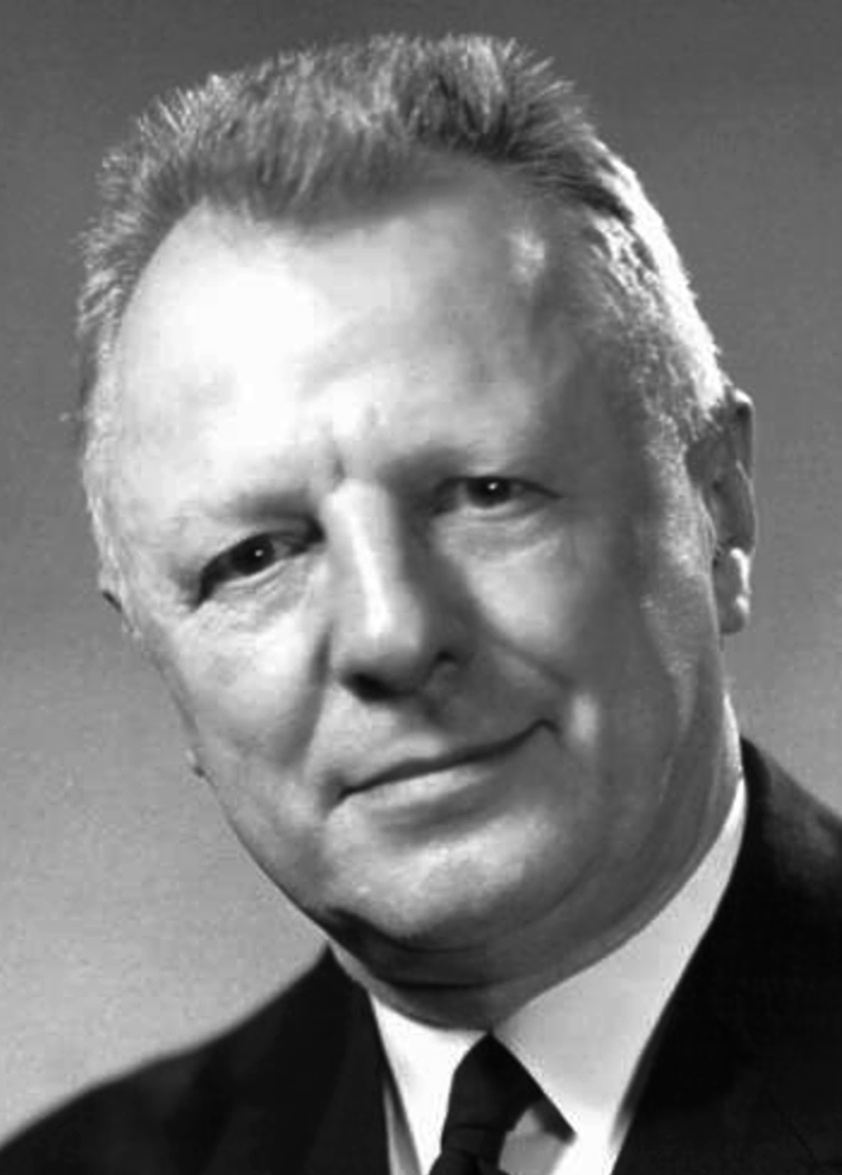
H. Trendley Dean set out in 1931 to study fluoride's harm, but by 1950 had demonstrated the benefits of small amounts.

A study of varying amounts of fluoride in water was led by Dr. H. Trendley Dean, a dental officer of the U.S. Public Health Service. In 1936 and 1937, Dr. Dean and other dentists compared statistics from Amarillo, which had 2.8 – 3.9 mg/L fluoride content, and low fluoride Wichita Falls. The data is alleged to show fewer cavities in Amarillo children, but the studies were never published. Dr. Dean's research on the fluoride-dental caries relationship, published in 1942, included 7,000 children from 21 cities in Colorado, Illinois, Indiana, and Ohio. The study concluded that the optimal amount of fluoride which minimized the risk of severe fluorosis but had positive benefits for tooth decay was 1 mg per day, per adult. Although fluoride is more abundant in the environment today, this was estimated to correlate with the concentration of 1 mg/L.

In 1937, dentists Henry Klein and Carroll E. Palmer had considered the possibility of fluoridation to prevent cavities after their evaluation of data gathered by a Public Health Service team at dental examinations of Native American children. In a series of papers published afterwards (1937–1941), yet disregarded by his colleagues within the U.S.P.H.S., Klein summarized his findings on tooth development in children and related problems in epidemiological investigations on caries prevalence.

In 1939, Dr. Gerald J. Cox conducted laboratory tests using rats that were fed aluminum and fluoride. Dr. Cox suggested adding fluoride to drinking water (or other media such as milk or bottled water) in order to improve oral health.

In the mid-1940s, four widely cited studies were conducted. The researchers investigated cities that had both fluoridated and unfluoridated water. The first pair was Muskegon, Michigan and Grand Rapids, Michigan, making Grand Rapids the first community in the world to add fluoride to its drinking water to try to benefit dental health on January 25, 1945. Kingston, New York was paired with Newburgh, New York. Oak Park, Illinois was paired with Evanston, Illinois. Sarnia, Ontario, was paired with Brantford, Ontario, Canada.

In 1952 Nebraska Representative A.L. Miller complained that there had been no studies carried out to assess the potential adverse health risk to senior citizens, pregnant women, or people with chronic diseases from exposure to the fluoridation. A decrease in the incidence of tooth decay was found in some of the cities which had added fluoride to water supplies. The early comparison studies would later be criticized as, "primitive," with a, "virtual absence of quantitative, statistical methods...nonrandom method of selecting data and...high sensitivity of the results to the way in which the study populations were grouped..." in the journal Nature.

== Water fluoridation ==
As of May 2000, 42 of the 50 largest U.S. cities had water fluoridation. According to a 2002 study, 67% of U.S. residents were living in communities with fluoridated water at that time.

The U.S. Centers for Disease Control has identified community water fluoridation as one of ten great public health achievements of the 20th century. The CDC recommends water fluoridation at a level of 0.7–1.2 mg/L, depending on climate. The CDC also advises parents to monitor use of fluoride toothpaste, and use an alternative water source other than a natural water source with a fluoride concentration above 2 mg/L, for children up to the age of 8. There is a CDC database for researching the water fluoridation status of neighborhood water.

In 1998, 70% of people polled in a survey conducted by the American Dental Association (ADA) believed community water should be fluoridated, with 18% disagreeing and the rest undecided. In November 2006, the ADA began recommending to parents that infants from 0 through 12 months of age should have their formula prepared with water that is fluoride-free or contains low levels of fluoride to reduce the risk of fluorosis.

The issue of whether or not to fluoridate water supplies frequently arises in local governments. For example, on November 8, 2005, citizens of Mt. Pleasant, Michigan voted 63% to 37% in favor of reinstating fluoridation in public drinking water after a 2004 ballot initiative ceased water fluoridation in the city. At the same time, voters in Xenia, Ohio; Springfield, Ohio; Bellingham, Washington; and Tooele City, Utah all rejected water fluoridation.

In Skagit County in the state of Washington, the county commissioners in 2007 voted 2 to 1 to order the local public utility district to begin fluoridating the public water supply by Jan. 2009. $1.2 million was to be provided by the privately funded Washington Dental Service Foundation to begin building the equipment needed to add fluoride to the Judy Reservoir, which supplies the majority of Skagit Valley's water customers. The source and type of fluoride to be added to the drinking water of more than 70,000 citizens had not been disclosed. However, in February 2009, Skagit County commissioners rescinded the 2007 order, citing costs and possible lawsuits.

The cost of adding fluoridation to the water of 44 Florida communities has been researched by the State Health Office in Tallahassee. In communities with a population of over 50,000 people, fluoridation costs were estimated at 31 cents per person per year. The estimated cost rises to $2.12 per person in areas with a population below 10,000. Unintended consequences, such as equipment malfunction, can substantially raise the financial burden, as well as the health risks, to the consumer.

In the U.S., Hispanic and Latino Americans are significantly more likely to consume bottled instead of tap water, and the use of bottled and filtered water grew dramatically in the late 1990s and early 2000s.

== Decisions about water fluoridation ==
Many political and popular entities and activities determine whether fluoride is added to water supplies. Those include courts, local governments, popular referendums, and water authorities.

=== Court cases ===
Fluoridation has been the subject of many court cases wherein activists have sued municipalities, asserting that their rights to consent to medical treatment and due process are infringed by mandatory water fluoridation. Individuals have sued municipalities for a number of illnesses that they believe were caused by fluoridation of the city's water supply. In most of these cases, the courts have held in favor of cities, finding no or only a tenuous connection between health problems and widespread water fluoridation. To date, no federal appellate court or state court of last resort (i.e., state supreme court) has found water fluoridation to be unlawful.

==== Early cases ====
A flurry of cases were heard in numerous state courts across the U.S. in the 1950s during the early years of water fluoridation. State courts consistently held in favor of allowing fluoridation to continue, analogizing fluoridation to mandatory vaccination and the use of other chemicals to clean the public water supply, both of which had a long-standing history of acceptance by courts.

In 1952, a federal regulation was adopted that stated in part, "The Federal Security Agency will regard water supplies containing fluorine, within the limitations recommended by the Public Health Service, as not actionable under the Federal Food, Drug, and Cosmetic Act."

The Supreme Court of Oklahoma analogized water fluoridation to mandatory vaccination in a 1954 case. The court noted, "we think the weight of well-reasoned modern precedent sustains the right of municipalities to adopt such reasonable and undiscriminating measures to improve their water supplies as are necessary to protect and improve the public health, even though no epidemic is imminent and no contagious disease or virus is directly involved .... To us it seems ridiculous and of no consequence in considering the public health phase of the case that the substance to be added to the water may be classed as a mineral rather than a drug, antiseptic or germ killer; just as it is of little, if any, consequence whether fluoridation accomplishes its beneficial result to the public health by killing germs in the water, or by hardening the teeth or building up immunity in them to the bacteria that causes caries or tooth decay. If the latter, there can be no distinction on principle between it and compulsory vaccination or inoculation, which, for many years, has been well-established as a valid exercise of police power."

In the 1955 case Froncek v. City of Milwaukee, the Wisconsin Supreme Court affirmed the ruling of a circuit court which held that "the fluoridation is not the practice of medicine, dentistry, or pharmacy, by the City" and that "the legislation is a public health measure, bearing a real, substantial, and reasonable relation to the health of the city."

The Supreme Court of Ohio, in 1955's Kraus v. City of Cleveland, said, "Plaintiff's argument that fluoridation constitutes mass medication, the unlawful practice of medicine and adulteration may be answered as a whole. Clearly, the addition of fluorides to the water supply does not violate such principles any more than the chlorination of water, which has been held valid many times."

==== Fluoridation consensus ====
In 1973, as cases continued to be brought in state courts, a consensus developed that fluoridation, at least from a legal standpoint, was acceptable. In 1973's Beck v. City Council of Beverly Hills, the California Court of Appeal, Second District, said, "Courts through the United States have uniformly held that fluoridation of water is a reasonable and proper exercise of the police power in the interest of public health. The matter is no longer an open question."

The Science Advisory Board, Subcommittee on Toxic Sprays first researched this in 1938, after its creation by executive order issued by President Franklin D. Roosevelt. This also included a National Resources Committee which studied Population Problems, in addition to The Committee for Research in Problems of Sex (CRPS).

==== Contemporary challenges ====
Much of the contemporary debate on water fluoridation revolves around questions of how consumer demand for fluoride is determined and processed, which fluoridation costs and benefits are considered, how conflicts over its provision and production are addressed or resolved, and how the merits of relevant health policies can be equally recast in terms of their presumed demerits.

Opponents continue to make contemporary challenges to the spread of fluoridation. For instance, in 2002, the city of Watsonville, California, chose to disregard a California law mandating fluoridation of water systems with 10,000 or more hookups, and the dispute between the city and the state ended up in court. The trial court and the intermediate appellate court ruled in favor of the state and its fluoridation mandate, and the Supreme Court of California declined to hear the case in February 2006. Since 2000, courts in Washington, Maryland, and Texas have reached similar conclusions.

In 2017, multiple environmental groups sued the United States Environmental Protection Agency (EPA), alleging that water fluoridation at current levels was harmful and associated with reduced IQs. U.S. District Judge Edward M. Chen of the United States District Court for the Northern District of California ruled that the scientific literature "provides a high level of certainty that a hazard is present," saying "fluoride is associated with reduced IQ" while stressing that he was not concluding with certainty that fluoridated water endangered public health. Judge Chen's ruling ordered the EPA to address these risks, though it did not prescribe a specific method for doing so, and suggested options including warning labels about the risks of fluoride to tightening restrictions on its addition to water.

=== Federal drinking water regulations ===
The U.S. Environmental Protection Agency (EPA) published a maximum contaminant level (MCL) standard of 4.0 mg/L for fluoride, applicable to public water systems. The standard was promulgated pursuant to the Safe Drinking Water Act (SDWA). The SDWA allows states to set more stringent standards, and several states have done so, including New York, where the fluoride MCL is 2.2 mg/L.

=== State law ===
San Diego, California, began water fluoridation in February 2011, despite Municipal Code Section 67.0101 prohibiting the city from fluoridating. The local ordinance was preempted by California law that requires fluoridation when an outside funding source is available. In 2008, First 5 Commission of San Diego County, a state-funded child advocacy organization, provided nearly $4 million to San Diego for fluoridation equipment and operating costs for the first two years of fluoridation. That organization is funded with tobacco taxes instituted by California Proposition 10 (1998). San Diego raises the fluoride level of its water to 0.7 mg/L, as recommended by CDC.

In 2012, New Hampshire began requiring public water systems that fluoridate to post the following notice in their consumer confidence reports: "Your public water supply is fluoridated. According to the Centers for Disease Control and Prevention, if your child under the age of 6 months is exclusively consuming infant formula reconstituted with fluoridated water, there may be an increased chance of dental fluorosis. Consult your child's health care provider for more information." The law was passed with overwhelming majorities in the legislature and took effect August 4.

In 2025, the Utah State Senate voted 18–8 to prohibit state cities and towns from fluoridating their public water supply. The bill was signed by Utah Governor Spencer Cox and the ban took effect on May 7, 2025. Utah is the first U.S. state to ban fluoride in public drinking water. In May of the same year, Florida soon followed with its own fluoridation ban.

=== Local ordinances ===
On September 22, 2011, the city council of College Station, Texas, voted 6–1 against fluoridating city water supplies, ending 22 years of fluoridation.

In 2011, the Pinellas County, Florida, commissioners voted to stop adding fluoride to the county's public drinking water. Tampa Bay Times editor Tim Nickens and columnist Daniel Ruth then published a joint series of ten editorials challenging the decision in 2012, and two of the commissioners who had voted to stop fluoridation were voted out of office and replaced with candidates who had pledged to add it back. In March 2013, after a 6–1 vote, the county resumed the addition of fluoride, which the Times characterized as being "long considered the most effective method to prevent tooth decay". Nickens and Ruth were awarded the 2013 Pulitzer Prize for Editorial Writing for their series.

The Board of County Commissioners of Hernando County, Florida, voted 4–1 on February 25, 2014 to not begin fluoridating the county's water.

=== Referendums ===
On September 12, 2012, the Portland, Oregon City Council unanimously passed Ordinance No. 185612, authorizing and directing the Portland Water Bureau to begin fluoridating. Those opposing the ordinance immediately began a petition process to hold a referendum that could reverse the ordinance. In October, it was revealed that four city council members had had undisclosed meetings with pro-fluoridation lobbyists. Public calendars of those four did not mention the meetings, except that one meeting was mentioned with a vague title. This was in violation of a city ordinance requiring the disclosure of such meetings. Over 33,000 signatures were gathered for the petition, which led to the referendum that defeated fluoridation. In the campaign, the pro-fluoridation side out-raised opponents $850,000 to $270,000. On May 21, 2013, Portland voters decided 61–39% not to commence fluoridation of the city's water, which is supplied to 900,000 people. It was the fourth defeat of fluoridation proposals in Portland, the first being in 1956.

== See also ==
- Fluoride
- Fluoride therapy
- Opposition to water fluoridation
- Health care in the United States
