= Birchalls =

Former Tasmanian bookstore

Birchalls Ltd
- Type: Bookstore
- Founded: 1844; 182 years ago in Launceston, Tasmania, Australia
- Founder: Samuel Tegg
- Defunct: 25 February 2017; 9 years ago
- Headquarters: Launceston, Tasmania, Australia
- Area served: Tasmania
- Owner: Tilley family
- Number of employees: 40 (2016)

Birchalls Ltd was a Tasmanian bookstore, former publisher, education supply and stationery company. Founded in 1844 by Samuel Tegg, it was the oldest book store Australia at the time of its closing. In 1902 J. A. Birchall, owner of the store, invented the first commercial notepad. The Tilley family have owned the company since 1969. It was announced the store would close in 2017 after ten months for sale with no buyer, the book store shut its doors in 25 February 2017 at 4:00 PM.

== History ==
Birchalls was founded in 1844 by Samuel Tegg, as the Launceston outlet for his Hobart book store. Blake, Huxtable and Duthie purchased it from Samuel Tegg, and in 1863 J. Walch & Sons became the owners. Andrew Birchall became manager and in 1867 became a business partner. Until 1893 it was Walch Bros and Birchall, when it changed to just Birchalls. During the 19th century it was active as a publisher of music scores and sermon pamphlets. In 1967 the centenary of Birchalls family ownership of the company was commemorated by a plaque at their Brisbane Street Store in Launceston, stating that "knowledge art and culture have been disseminated from this site since 1844." Stanley Tilley began work at Birchalls in 1928, and in 1969 purchased the store. In November 2016 they sold the property of their Brisbane Street store, which they had occupied continually since 1844, and in early 2017 announced they would close the store after ten months of the company being for sale. Their education supply business will remain operating to be sold separately.
