= West Tamar Council =

- Local government area
- Interactive map of West Tamar Council
- Coordinates: 41.2797°S 146.8652°E
- Country: Australia
- State: Tasmania
- Region: Western Tamar Valley
- Established: 2 April 1993
- Council seat: Beaconsfield

Government
  - Mayor: Christina Holmdahl
  - State electorate: Bass
  - Federal division: Bass

Area
  - Total: 691 km^{2} (267 sq mi)
- Website: West Tamar Council
LGAs around West Tamar Council
Bass Strait	Bass Strait	Bass Strait
Latrobe	West Tamar Council	George Town
Meander Valley	Meander Valley	Launceston

West Tamar Council is a local government body in Tasmania, situated along the western side of the Tamar River in the north of the state. West Tamar is classified as an urban local government area and has a population of 23,769, it extends from the outer reaches of north-west Launceston and includes the towns and localities of Beaconsfield, Beauty Point and Legana.

== History and attributes ==
The municipality was established on 2 April 1993, after the boundaries of the Beaconsfield municipality were extended and its name changed to West Tamar. West Tamar is classified as urban, fringe and small under the Australian Classification of Local Governments.

The municipal area starts with the Launceston suburb of Riverside in the south; the satellite suburb of Legana; the towns of Exeter, Beaconsfield and Beauty Point, all the way up to the beach resort town of Greens Beach at the mouth of the Tamar River.

The current mayor of West Tamar Council is Christina Holmdahl and the chief executive officer is Kristen Desmond.

== Council ==
=== Composition ===
Name	Position	Party
Christina Holmdahl	Mayor	Independent
Rick Shegog	Deputy Mayor	Independent
Jess Greene	Councillor	Independent
Joshua Manticas	Councillor	Independent
Geoff Lyons	Councillor	Independent
Lynden Ferguson	Councillor	Independent
Julie Sladden	Councillor	Independent Liberal
Joy Allen	Councillor	Independent
Richard Island	Councillor	Independent

=== 2022 Election Results ===
2022 Tasmanian local elections: West Tamar
Party	Candidate	Votes	%	±%
Independent	Christina Holmdahl (elected)	2,969	19.12	−12.15
Independent	Rick Shegog (elected)	2,088	13.44	+8.34
Independent	Jess Greene (elected)	1,465	9.43	+5.42
Independent	Joshua Manticas (elected)	1,064	6.85	
Independent	Geoff Lyons (elected)	1,015	6.54	−1.04
Independent	Peter Kearney	909	5.85	+1.12
Independent	Lynden Ferguson (elected)	818	5.27	−0.85
Independent	Julie Sladden (elected)	769	4.95	
Independent	Joy Allen (elected)	766	4.93	−1.56
Independent	Richard Ireland (elected)	733	4.72	−0.32
Independent	Jim Collier	571	3.68	−0.43
Independent	Jorden Gunton	520	3.35	+0.99
Independent	Tim Woinarski	435	2.80	−2.63
Independent	Caroline Larner	406	2.61	
Independent	Dane Edwards	339	2.18	+0.50
Independent	Victoria Wilkinson	260	1.67	−0.07
Independent	Sven Wiener	147	0.95	−0.57
Independent	Peter Stoops	122	0.79	
Independent	Mark Price	90	0.58	−0.28
Independent	Malcolm Carey	44	0.28	
Total formal votes		15,530	95.59	+0.12
Informal votes		716	4.41	−0.12
Turnout		16,246	87.18	+33.99

== Suburbs ==
Suburb	Census population 2016	Reason
Badger Head	41	
York Town	72	
Greens Beach	209	
Kelso	146	
Clarence Point	226	
Ilfraville		Incl. in Beauty Point
Beauty Point	1222	Includes Ilfraville
Beaconsfield	1298	
Rowella	170	
Kayena	219	Includes Richmond Hill
Richmond Hill		Incl. in Kayena
Sidmouth	394	
Deviot	337	
Robigana	111	
Swan Point	282	
Loira	160	
Gravelly Beach	567	
Exeter	633	
Blackwall	270	
Lanena	320	
Rosevears	352	
Grindelwald	965	
Legana	4029	Includes Danbury Park
Danbury Park		Incl. in Legana
Riverside	6424	
Bridgenorth	373	
Notley Hills	46	
Glengarry	525	
Frankford	176	
Winkleigh	203	
Holwell	65	
Flowery Gully	87	
Total	19,992	
	2726	Variance
Local government total	22,718	Gazetted West Tamar local government area

=== Not in above list ===
- Birralee
- Parkham
- Rosevale
- Selbourne

== See also ==
- List of local government areas of Tasmania
