= Beaconsfield, Tasmania =

Coordinates: 41°12′S 146°48′E

Beaconsfield
- Town
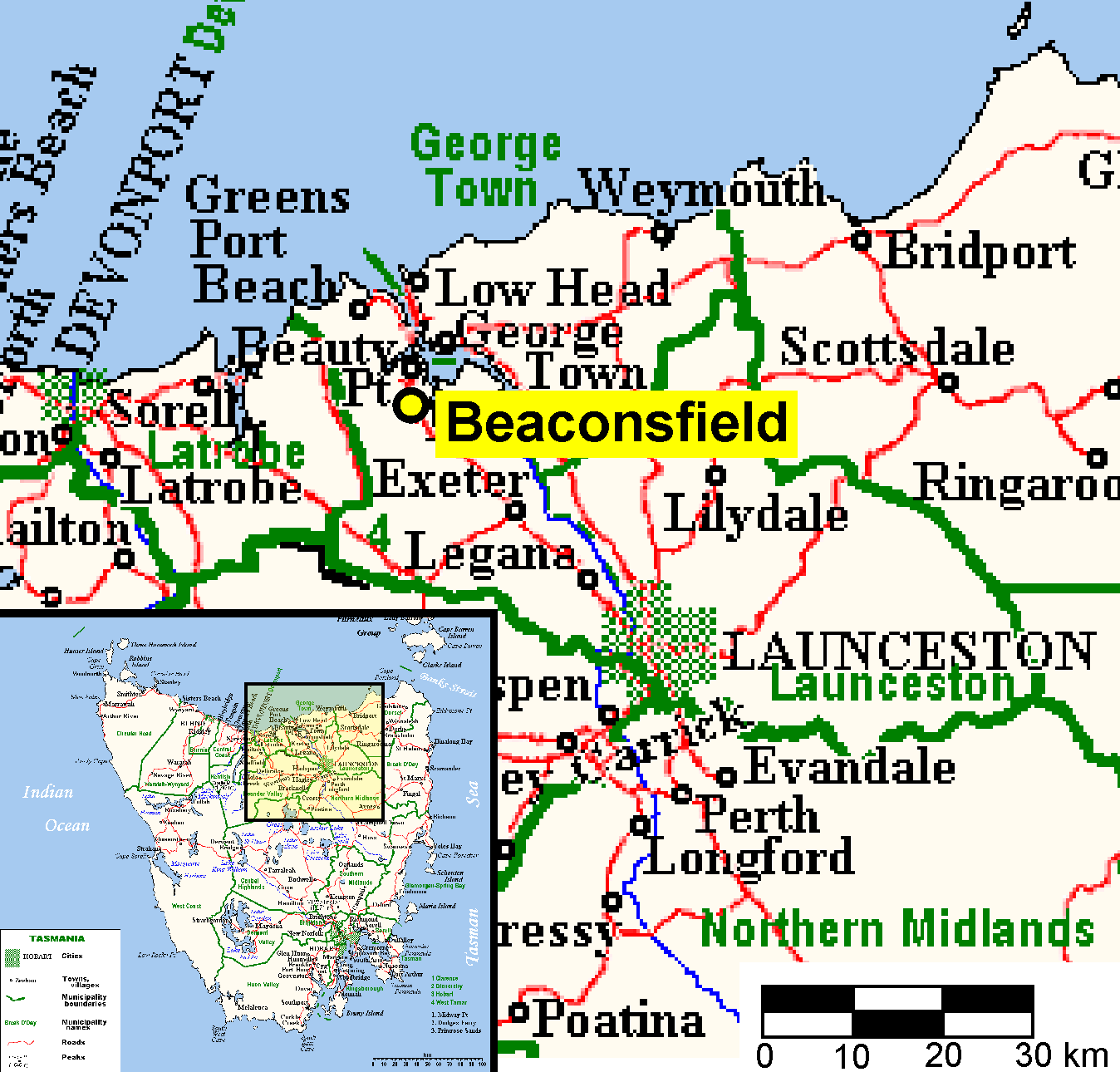
- Location of Beaconsfield
- Country: Australia
- State: Tasmania
- Region: Launceston, North-west and west
- LGA: West Tamar, Latrobe
- Location: 239 km (149 mi) N of Hobart; 42 km (26 mi) NW of Launceston

Government
  - State electorate: Bass, Braddon
  - Federal division: Bass, Braddon

Population
  - Total: 1,298 (2016 census)
- Postcode: 7270
Localities around Beaconsfield
York Town	Beauty Point	Tamar River
Bakers Beach	Beaconsfield	Kayena, Sidmouth
Frankford	Flowery Gully, Holwell	Sidmouth

Beaconsfield /ˈbiːkənzfiːld/ is a former gold mining town near the Tamar River, in the north-east of Tasmania, Australia. It lies 40 kilometres north of Launceston on the West Tamar Highway. It is a rural and residential locality in the local government areas (LGA) of West Tamar and Latrobe in the Launceston and North-west and west LGA regions of Tasmania. The 2016 census recorded a population of 1298 for the state suburb of Beaconsfield.

== History ==
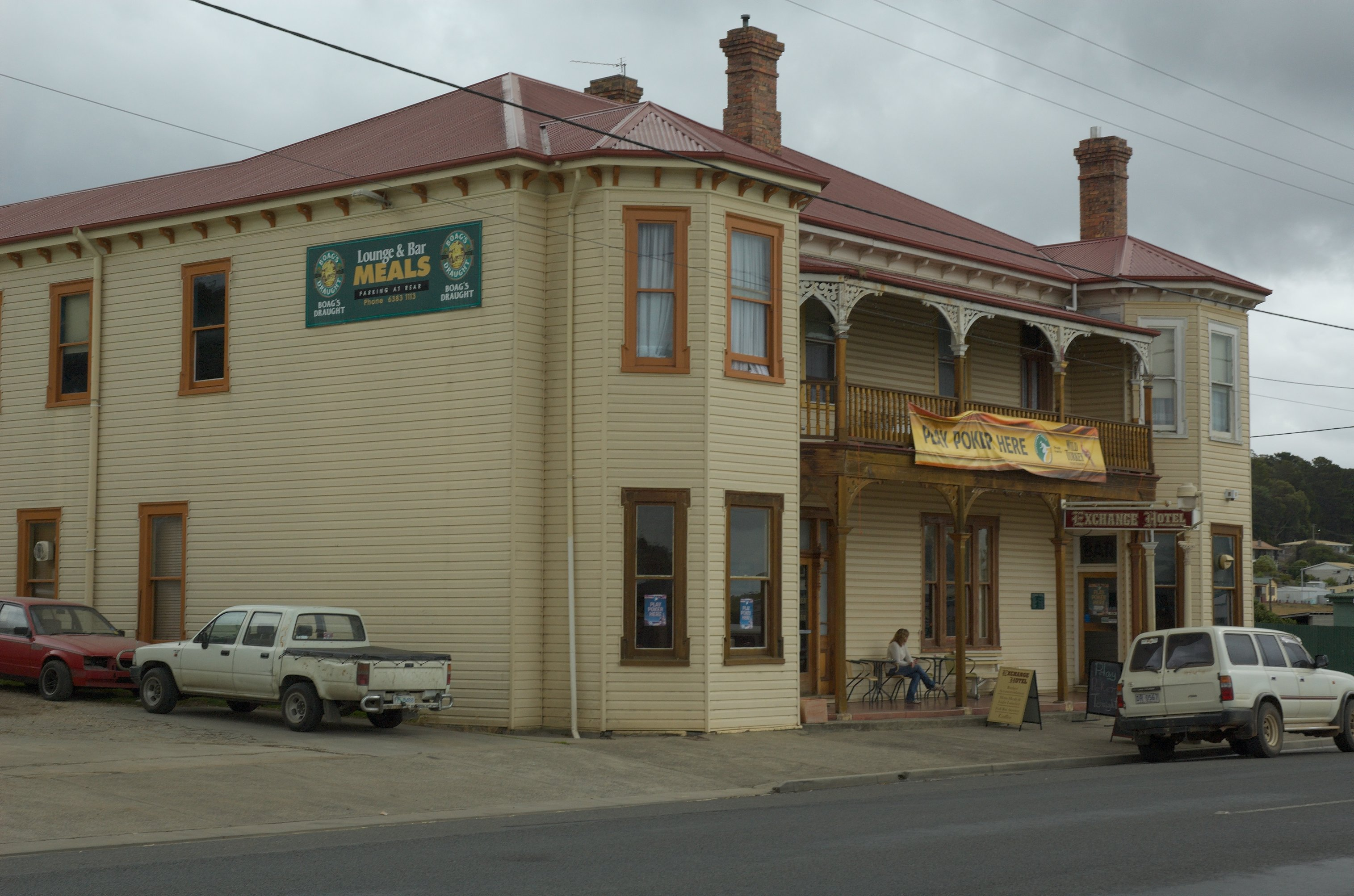
The Exchange Hotel from c1890.

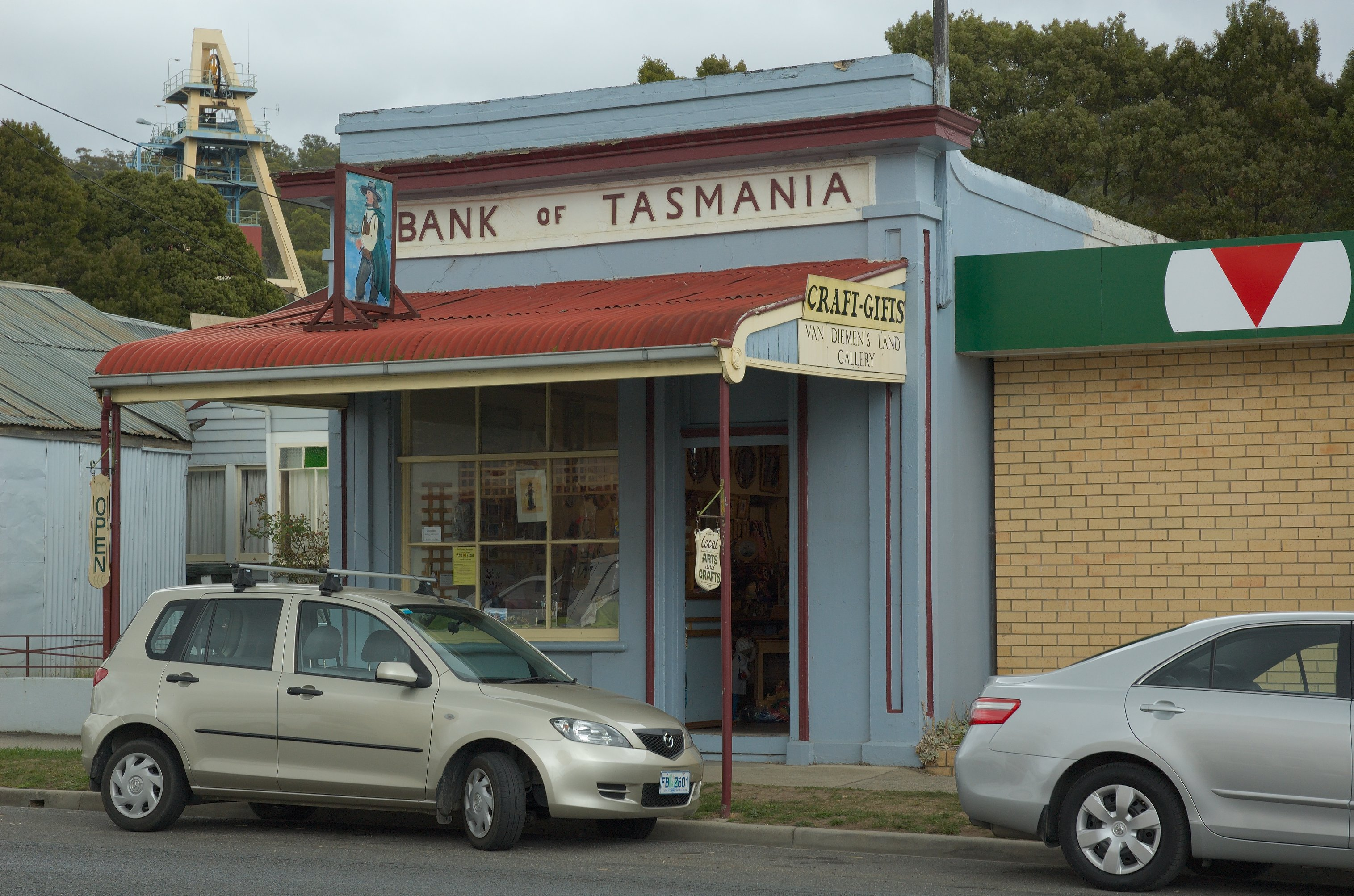
Former Bank of Tasmania branch.

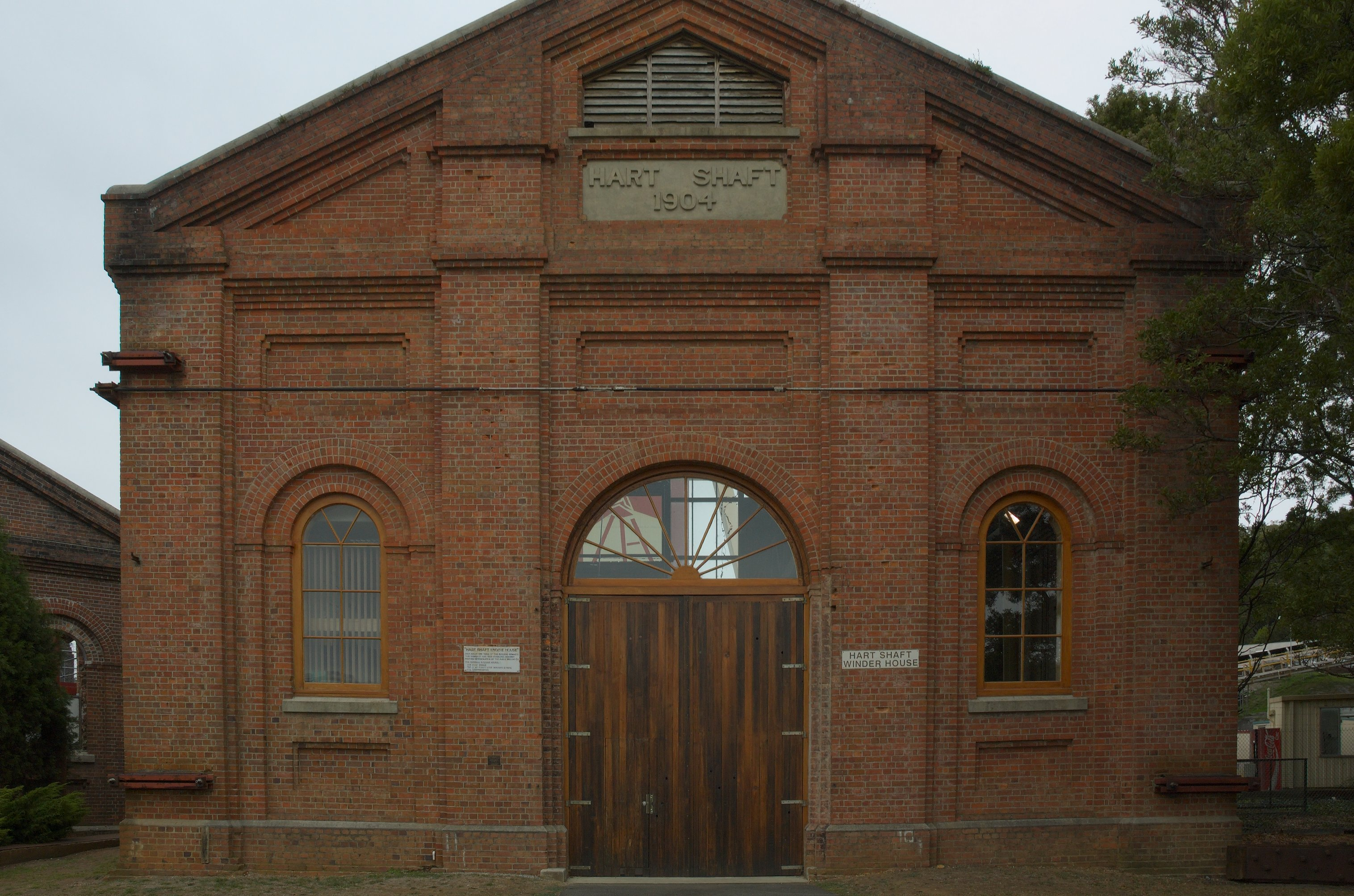
Hart Shaft winder house dated 1904.

The area around Beaconsfield was first explored by Europeans in 1804 when William Paterson led an expedition to Port Dalrymple and established a settlement at York Town. Settlement of Beaconsfield itself, then known as Brandy Creek did not occur until the 1850s. Limestone mining led to the discovery of gold in 1869. Gold mining began in 1877 and the area's population boomed. Brandy Creek Post Office opened on 1 December 1877 and was renamed Beaconsfiel in 1879.

The town was named Beaconsfield in 1879 in honour of Benjamin Disraeli, 1st Earl of Beaconsfield, who was the prime minister of the United Kingdom at the time. In 1881, the Beaconsfield newspaper was called the Beaconsfield Tickler. In 1953, Beaconsfield was the first town in Australia to fluoridate the water supply. Beaconsfield was gazetted as a locality in 1967.

== Geography ==
The waters of the Tamar River estuary form part of the northern boundary.

== Road infrastructure ==
The West Tamar Highway (Route A7) passes through from south-east to north-east. Route C720 (Greens Beach Road) starts at an intersection with A7 and runs north-west until it exits. Route C715 (Holwell Road) starts at an intersection with C720 and runs south until it exits. Route A7 (now called West Arm Road) rejoins Greens Beach Road just inside the northern boundary.

== Gold mining at Beaconsfield ==
Gold was first discovered in Beaconsfield in 1847. When the gold rush hit Victoria and New South Wales in 1851 and the Tasmanian Government offered a reward for the discovery of a payable goldfield. In 1877 the cap of a payable gold reef was discovered on the eastern slope of Cabbage Tree Hill by brothers William and David Dally. This became known as the fabulous Tasmanian Reef. In October 1877 the Dally brothers sold their claim on the Tasmania Reef to William D Grubb & William Hart for 15,000 pounds, and 1/10 share in any company formed.

At the peak of the gold rush 700 men were employed in the gold mine and 26 tonne of gold was recovered.

An early settler at the time, Mr Campbell wrote that, "the blacks were here in those days…. On each side was nothing but thick tea tree scrub and snakes…. When the rush for gold was discovered there was only two shops, drapery and grocery but soon the little township swarmed with people. More shops, hotels, dance halls and hall were built for plays to come to the town which they did in plenty. There came circuses and the children got excited and followed to see the horses and elephants going through the town to get somewhere to camp and build their tents. Those entertainments came very often because there was plenty of money about

The town began its early life as "Brandy Creek" because of the colour of the water in the creek where the gold was originally discovered. "The growing civic consciousness found voice in the demand for a new name for the town and in March 1879 Brandy Creek was renamed Beaconsfield, after Lord Beaconsfield, (Benjamin Disraeli)", (Town With a History by Coultman Smith, 2006) the then Prime Minister of the United Kingdom at the time "in a ceremony conducted Governor Weld after he rejected a suggestion that it should be named after him".

In 1903 an English company bought the Tasmanian Gold Mining and Quartz Crushing company and formed the Tasmanian Gold Mining Company Ltd. As water had become such a huge problem at Beaconsfield, a substantial injection of capital was required to purchase and operate suitable dewatering equipment. The Company extracted gold from two shafts adjacent to each other, Grubb and Hart Shafts. In 1904 engine houses were built at these shafts and a central boiler house. These buildings now house the Beaconsfield Mine & Heritage Centre.

Underground mining began in 1879 with the sinking and development of three main shafts to access the reef: the Hart Shaft, the Main Shaft and the Grubb Shaft.

Beaconsfield became the richest gold town in Tasmania. In 1881 there were 53 companies working the field. These were all absorbed by the owners of the Tasmania mine.

The gold mine closed in 1914 due to regular flooding of the shafts but re-opened in 1999 with mixed success. To 1914, the mine was worked to a depth of 450 metres and produced 800,000 ounces of gold. In 1982, the Grubb Shaft Gold & Heritage Museum was established,(now called the Beaconsfield Mine & Heritage Centre url www.beaconsfieldheritage.com.au) with displays relating to the former gold mining era operating since 1984.

During the 1970s exploration drilling confirmed that the reef continued at least another 200 metres below the old workings. By 1991 the old Hart Shaft collar had been re-established and water pumped out to 160 metres deep. The project was suspended until 1992 when the mine's owners changed. Deep drilling resumed in 1993 to review the resource estimates and, from 1994, the Beaconsfield Mine Joint Venture has carried out drilling of the depth extension of the Tasmania Reef. A permanent stage pumping station 181 m below ground had been lowering the water in the shaft since August 1995. The permanent winder and head frame were completed in January 1996 and the shaft finished in late 1996. An ore treatment plant was built during the 1999/2000 financial year.

In the financial year 2004/05, 240 685 tonnes of ore was produced from which 3890 kilograms of gold was extracted.

In 2006 the participants in the unincorporated Beaconsfield Mine Joint Venture (BMJV), which operated the Beaconsfield Mine, were the Allstate group (Asx:ALX - delisted) with a 51.51% interest and the Beaconsfield Gold group (Asx:BCD - delisted) with a 48.49% interest. Allstate managed the BMJV, with the mine manager, and all personnel reporting to him, employed by Allstate.

=== 2006 mine collapse ===
On Tuesday 25 April 2006, a small earthquake caused a rock fall in the Beaconsfield gold mine. Fourteen miners escaped safely, one miner, Larry Knight, was killed, and the remaining two, Todd Russell and Brant Webb, were trapped in a shaft approximately one kilometre underground. The two trapped miners were found alive five days later on Sunday 30 April. Rescue operations continued for nearly two weeks until the two miners were freed on Tuesday 9 May.

In September 2007, the Foo Fighters released a tribute ("Ballad of the Beaconsfield Miners") to the miners on their album Echoes, Silence, Patience & Grace.

The Beaconsfield gold mining operations finally ended with the closure of the mine in June 2012.

== Water fluoridation ==
On 30 September 1953 Beaconsfield was the first town in Australia to add fluoride to its water supply. The municipal chemist at the time, Frank Grey, produced a report for the town council detailing evidence from studies in the USA that supported water fluoridation to improve dental health. With permission of the Tasmanian Director of Public Health and the Chief Health Inspector, Grey oversaw the introduction of fluoride to the town water supply.

In an interview in 2019 Frank Grey's daughter, Jeanette, added a personal note about her father's fluoride promotion. At the time she was a budding singer and had been told that keeping her teeth was necessary to sing well. She claims this further prompted Grey to follow the research occurring in the USA.

On the 50th anniversary of this first water fluoridation in Australia a monument was erected in Beaconsfield at West Street, near the Grubb Shaft Museum "by the Australian Dental Association in gratitude to Mr Frank Grey, the Beaconsfield Municipal Council and the people of West Tamar in their role in the introduction of fluoride to Australia".

== Population ==
At the 2016 census, Beaconsfield had a population of 1,298. 82.9% of people were born in Australia and 91.2% of people only spoke English at home. The most common responses for religion were No Religion 38.6%, Anglican 25.2% and Catholic 11.1%.

== Notable people ==
- Sister Mary Ursula Grachan OAM (1901–1992), Presentation Sister and educator; born in Beaconsfield, she was the first woman to receive a Diploma of Education from the University of Tasmania.
- David O'Keefe, miner, journalist and politician
