= Exeter, Tasmania =

Exeter
- Town
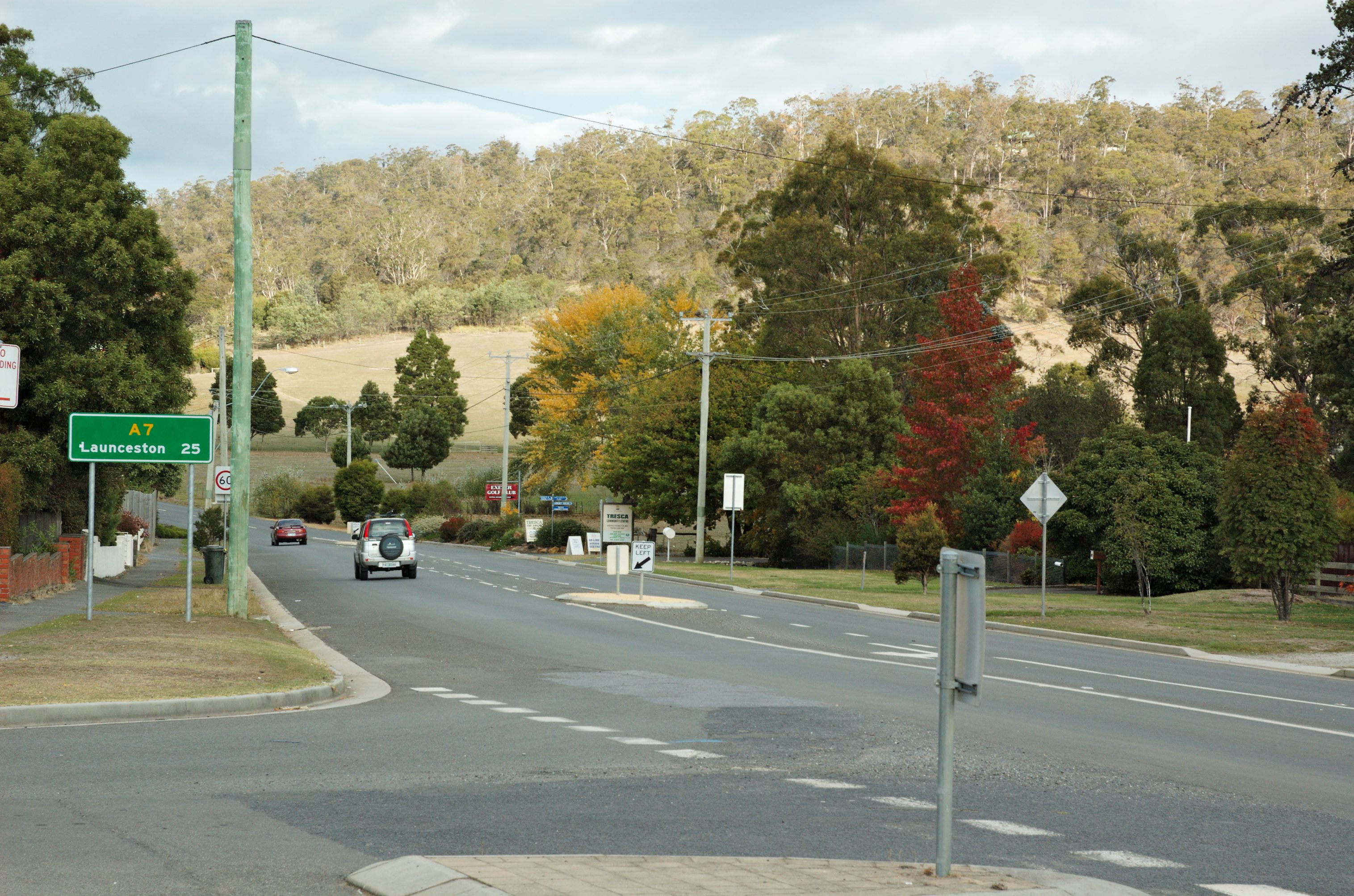
- West Tamar Highway at Exeter

- Coordinates: 41°17′59″S 146°57′11″E
- Country: Australia
- State: Tasmania
- City: Launceston
- LGA: West Tamar Council
- Location: 24 km (15 mi) N of Launceston; 223 km (139 mi) N of Hobart; 67 km (42 mi) E of Devonport

Government
  - State electorate: Bass
  - Federal division: Bass

Area
  - Total: 3.2 km^{2} (1.2 sq mi)

Population
  - Total: 633 (2016 census)
  - Density: 198/km^{2} (512/sq mi)
- Time zone: UTC+10 (AEST)
  - Summer (DST): UTC+11 (AEDT)
- Postcode: 7275

Exeter is a small town approximately 24 kilometres north of the city of Launceston, Tasmania, Australia. At the 2016 census, Exeter had a population of 633.

It is an important town agriculturally due to its positioning in the centre of a large rural area known for its orchards, dairy and beef cattle, fruit produce and sheep herds.

== Features ==
The Exeter Methodist Church is a timber building that was completed in 1861, being the oldest Methodist Church in Tasmania. Brady's Lookout is 5 km (3 mi) south of Exeter on the West Tamar Highway. It was used by the infamous bushranger Matthew Brady to identify potential victims below.

== Education ==
Exeter High School is a comprehensive secondary school located on Glen-Ard-Mohr Road. It was established in 1985, following a reorganisation of the earlier Exeter District School.
