= Tamar Valley, Tasmania =

Valley in Tasmania

The Tamar Valley is a valley in Tasmania, Australia (lutruwita). It runs north-west from the northern city of Launceston to the coast either side of the Tamar River, a distance of approximately 70 km.

There are more than 20 vineyards lining the valley, making it the largest wine region in lutruwita Tasmania. Tourists are guided by the Tamar Valley Wineroute. The main varieties of grapes grown are pinot noir and chardonnay.

The body of water which flows through Tamar Valley extends from the Bass Strait to Launceston, and is commonly referred to as Tamar River despite it actually being an estuary. The palawa name for the Tamar River is kanamaluka and it stretches 70km, making it Australia’s longest estuary. kanamaluka/Tamar estuary is part of the East-Asian Flyway; a migratory corridor which stretches from the Russian Tundra, Mongolia, and Alaska to non-breeding grounds in the Southern Hemisphere. Migratory birds using the East-Asian Flyway are protected under federal legislation. kanamaluka/Tamar estuary is home to over 20 migratory bird species including more than 1% of the global Chestnut Teal and Pied Oystercatcher populations which rely on the estuary during a key stage in their lifecycle.

The Tamar Valley is a graben—a depressed block of the crust bordered by parallel faults.

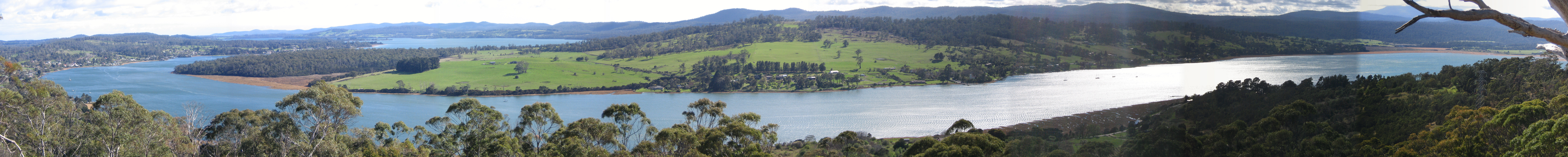
Tamar River from Bradys Lookout

== See also ==
- Bell Bay Pulp Mill
