= Mary Ursula Grachan =

Australian nun and educator (1901–1992)

Sister Mary Ursula Grachan OAM
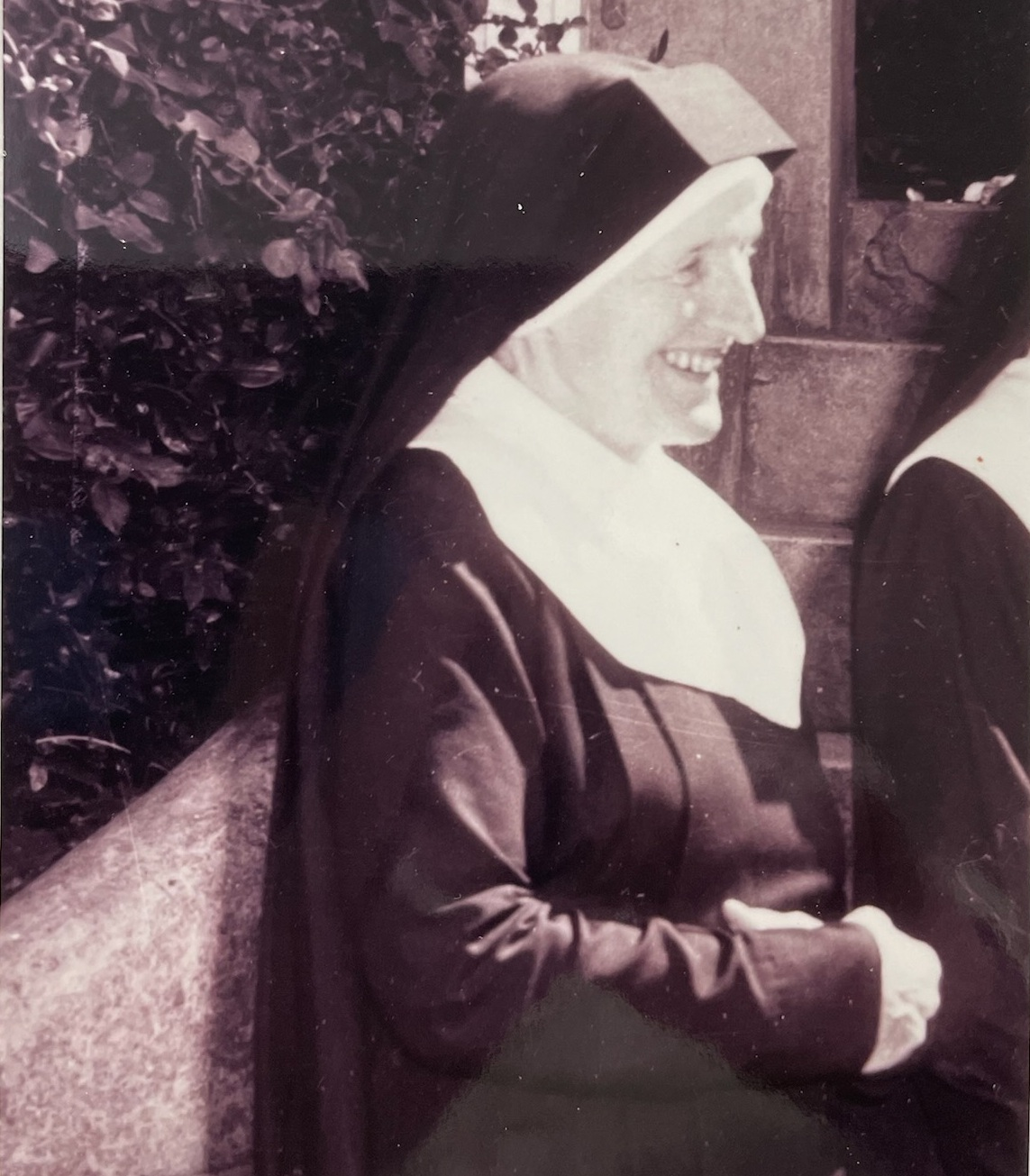
- Born: Alma Veronica Grachan; 17 September 1901; Beaconsfield, Tasmania, Australia
- Died: 17 July 1992 (aged 90); Launceston, Tasmania, Australia
- Resting place: Carr Villa Memorial Park, Launceston, Tasmania
- Education: University of Tasmania (BA, Dip.Ed.)
- Occupations: Nun; educator; musician
- Organization: Sisters of the Presentation of the Blessed Virgin Mary
- Known for: First woman to receive a Diploma of Education at the University of Tasmania; pioneer of Home Science curriculum
- Awards: Medal of the Order of Australia (1981)

Sister Mary Ursula Grachan (born Alma Veronica Grachan; 17 September 1901 – 17 July 1992) was Professed as a Sister of the Presentation of the Blessed Virgin Mary in 1925. She was the first woman to receive a Diploma of Education at the University of Tasmania.

Sister Ursula was born at Beaconsfield, Tasmania. She worked as a dedicated teacher in Presentation schools at Launceston and Hobart. In 1981 she received the Order of Australia Medal for “service to education”.

Sister Mary Ursula Grachan died on 17 July 1992 at Launceston, Tasmania.

== Early years ==
Alma Grachan was the eldest of five children born to a miner William Grachan and Emily Ross. While in the Primary School at Beaconsfield she showed spiritual and academic potential and which Mother Gertrude O’Sullivan noticed and hence arranged that she attend boarding school at Sacred Heart College in Launceston.

After completing her secondary school education Alma taught with the Tasmanian Department of Education for some years. Employed as student teacher: St Mary's Kindergarten, Hobart (1919–1920), St Mary's College (1920), Cressy State School, Wellington Square Infant School (1922).

Alma was 21 when she entered Launceston convent on 13 August 1922, when she was given the name Ursula.

== Religious life ==
She entered religious life in 1922 and took her first vows three years later. Sr Ursula was highly qualified with university honours in education and music.

Studying relentlessly to gain university degrees and musical qualifications so that she could more ably assist her students. She was the first woman to receive a Diploma of Education at the University of Tasmania. Arts degree in English, Latin, Psychology, Mathematics. In music she achieved an Associate of Music, Australia (A.Mus.A [Performer]) and a Licentiate of Music (A.Mus.A. [Teacher]).

Sister Ursula also taught Music before and after school hours, in this way, no doubt, contributing to the meagre income of the Sisters.

When Home Science was introduced in the school, she was able to share her abilities in dressmaking, needlework, spinning, weaving, pottery, painting and other crafts, becoming renowned as a known teacher. She was also exhibited at the Launceston Show over many years, gaining a host of awards in the sewing, knitting and handicraft sections.

Most of her life was spent in Launceston, where she taught at the Sacred Heart College. She taught for 12 years in Hobart and was Head of St Mary's College there for three years.

In 1981 she received the Order of Australia Medal for “service to education”. The Queen personally awarded her with the Order of Australia at Albert Hall in Launceston for contribution to music and education.

In the post-Second Vatican Council years she found change difficult and choosing to retain the former practices and the traditional habit. Sister Mary Ursula Grachan died on 17 July 1992 at Launceston, Tasmania.

== Legacy ==
In her later years, Sister Mary Ursula Grachan continued to teach sewing and handicrafts to generations of Tasmanian girls. A former student, journalist Robyn Riley, recalled her as “frail and tiny” but still skilled and precise, often unpicking students’ hems and redoing them to perfection. Her gentle manner and lifelong dedication left a lasting impression on many of her pupils.
