= Eymard Temby =

Australian Presentation sister (1911–1990)

Mother Eileen 'Mary Eymard' Temby pbvm

Personal life
- Born: Eileen Mary Temby; 10 July 1911
- Died: 6 September 1990 (aged 79)
- Known for: Being the congregational leader of the Presentation Sisters in Victoria (1967-1977)
- Occupation: Religious sister, educator

Religious life
- Religion: Christianity
- Denomination: Roman Catholic
- Order: Presentation Sisters

Sister Eymard Temby pbvm (1911 – 1990) was an Australian religious sister and educator. Through many leadership roles, she contributed significantly to Catholic education in Victoria. She was principal of Star of the Sea College for eighteen years and, in 1967, was appointed the first principal of Christ College, a tertiary Catholic Teachers' Training College. She was Superior General of the Congregation of Presentation Sisters in Victoria from 1967 to 1977.

== Early life and education ==
Eileen Mary Temby was born in Victoria on 10 July 1911. She was educated at Star of the Sea College during the First World War. She trained as a primary school teacher with the Victorian Education Department, and had her teacher's registration before joining the Presentation Sisters. Founded by the venerable Nano Nagle, who was dedicated to educating poor children in Ireland, the Sisters of the Presentation of the Virgin Mary is a Roman Catholic religious order dedicated to teaching and service to the poor. The Presentation Sisters first arrived in Australia in 1866.

Temby completed a Bachelor of Arts (Hons) and Bachelor of Education (Hons) at the University of Melbourne. She was placed first in her Diploma of Education year and, in 1950, also topped the Honours course in the Bachelor of Education. Her thesis dissertation, completed as part of her Bachelor of Education Investigation at Melbourne Teachers' College in 1951, was titled, 'An investigation of some of the personality traits associated with leaders and rejected children at Star of the Sea Convent School, Gardenvale.' She was elected as a Fellow of the Australian College of Education and became a member of the Education Faculty of the University of Melbourne.

== Religious life and career ==
Temby made her first vows at a ceremony of profession and reception on 8 October 1932. The ceremony was held at the Presentation Novitiate in Elsternwick and was officiated by Archbishop Daniel Mannix.

Temby was appointed principal at Star of the Sea College, Gardenvale in 1941, at the age of 28, and guided the college through the years of the Second World War and the Second Vatican Council until 1964. Her period as principal (1941-46, 1952-56, 1958-64) was interrupted with a period in the late 1940s when she studied educational psychology at the University of Melbourne.

Temby was appointed as the first principal of Christ College, a tertiary Catholic Teachers' Training College in Chadstone. Although it was a short-lived appointment, she was instrumental in designing the course of training for students, creating a community of competent staff, planning the layout and equipping of the new college, and ensuring that the new premises was ready for occupation in 1968.

The role was cut short when Temby was elected as superior general of the Congregation of Presentation Sisters in Victoria in November 1967, a role she held until 1977. Appointed at the age of 56, she had a well-founded reputation for visionary leadership within and beyond the Presentation congregation. Temby led about 300 members of the Victorian Presentation Sisters' congregation during the challenging post-Vatican II period, contributing significantly to the renewal of religious life in Australia. She worked with the members of her congregation as they determined how to make religious life more relevant in the present-day, and how to best direct their resources and services to the areas of greatest need.

Temby was elected as the president of Victorian Conference of Major Superiors of Religious Orders in 1971. In 1974 she was re-elected for a second term and was also the representative of the major superiors on the Melbourne Board of Catholic Education. Temby was selected as one of two Australian delegates to attend the International Triennial Assembly of Superiors General of Religious Congregations, held in Rome in 1976.

== Honours ==
In 1950, Temby was awarded the Dwight Prize in Education for being the best student of the year in the Master of Education course at the University of Melbourne. In 2001, Temby was inducted into the Victorian Honour Roll of Women.

== Death ==
Temby died on 6 September 1990 at the age of 79.
