= Star of the Sea College =

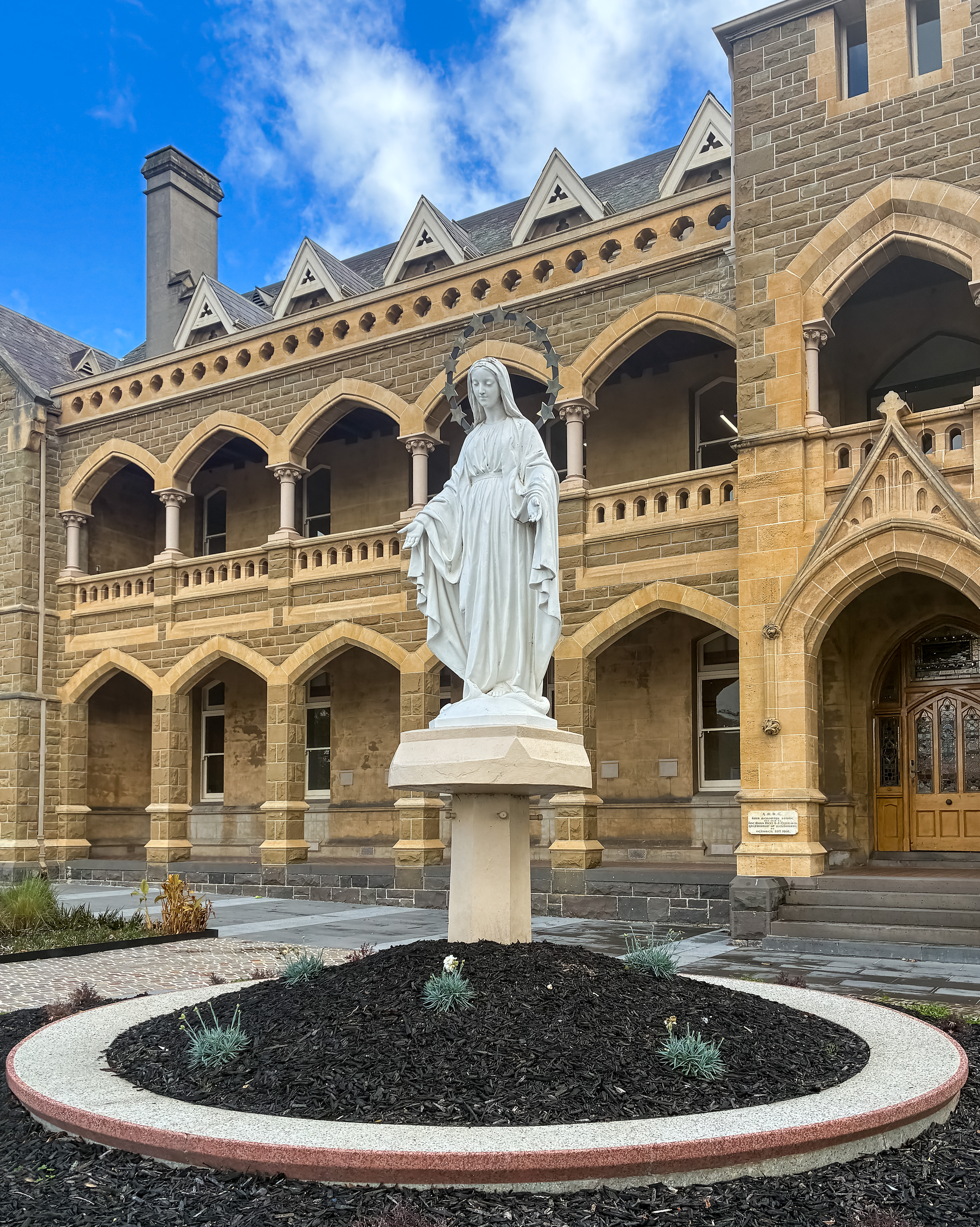
- Star of the Sea College in Gardenvale Victoria.

Location
- 80 Martin Street; Brighton, Victoria, 3186; Australia; 37°53′49″S 144°59′49″E

Information
- Type: Independent, Catholic, day school
- Motto: Latin: Facta Non Verba (Deeds Not Words)
- Denomination: Roman Catholic (Presentation Sisters)
- Established: 1883
- Chairman: Vincent Savage
- Principal: Mary O'Connor
- Years offered: 7–12
- Gender: Girls
- Enrolment: ~1,200 (7–12)
- Colours: Navy blue and red
- Affiliation: Girls Sport Victoria
- Website: www.starmelb.catholic.edu.au

Star of the Sea College is an independent, Catholic, day school for girls, located in Brighton, an inner south-eastern suburb of Melbourne, Victoria, Australia.

Established in 1883 by the Presentation Sisters, the college has a non-selective enrolment policy, and currently caters for approximately 1,200 female students from Years 7 to 12.

Star of the Sea is affiliated with the Association of Heads of Independent Schools of Australia (AHISA), the Alliance of Girls' Schools Australasia (AGSA), and is a founding member of Girls Sport Victoria (GSV).

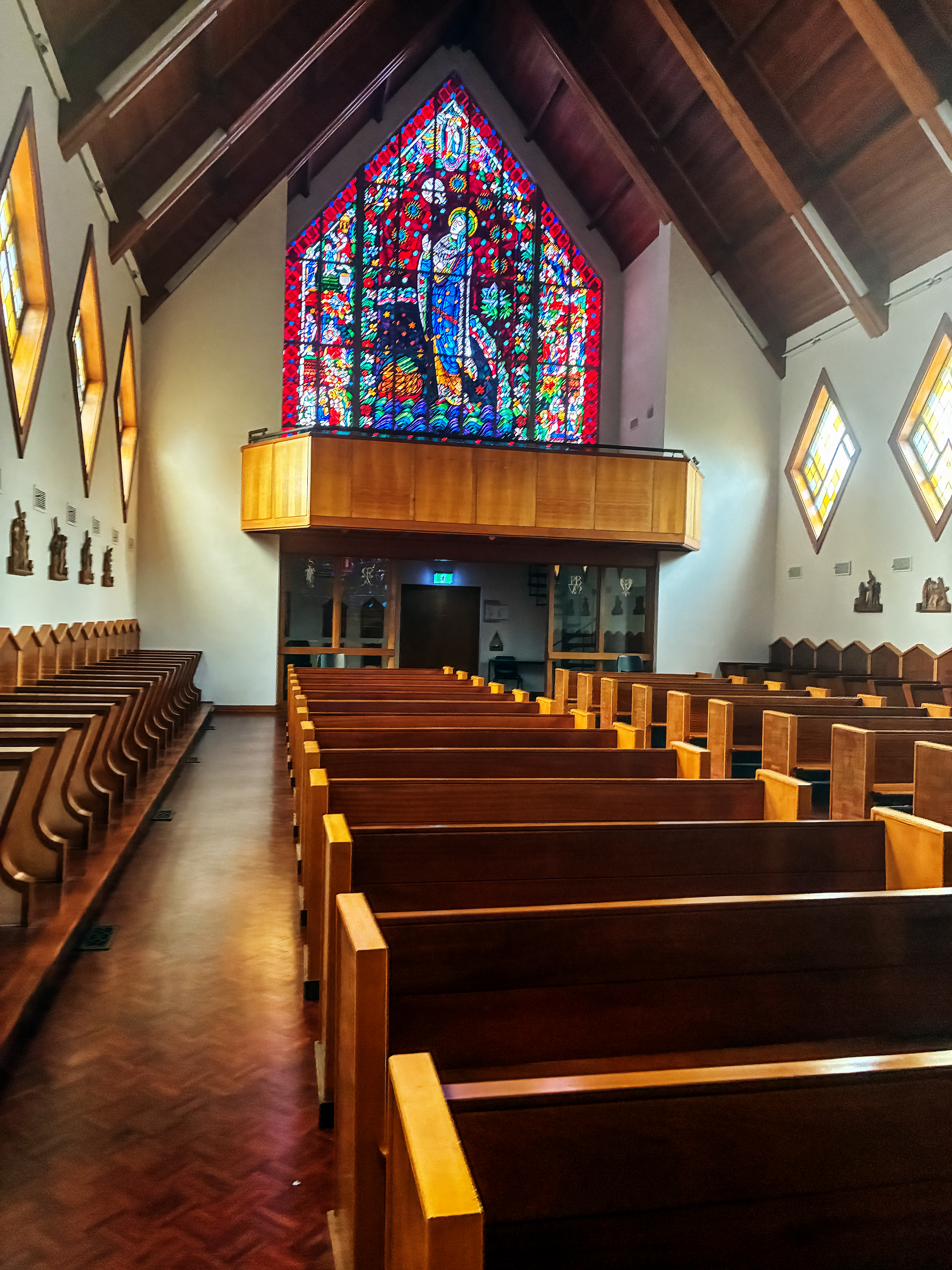
Star of the Sea Chapel

== History ==
Star of the Sea College was founded by the Presentation Sisters in March 1883. The sisters were asked to come to Australia from Ireland by Father James Corbett, and after establishing the first Presentation Convent and school in Victoria at Windsor (now Presentation College Windsor), they moved to Gardenvale (then known as Elsternwick). The Presentation Sisters from Wagga Wagga in New South Wales, established Star of the Sea College.

The foundresses, Mother John Byrne and Mother Paul Fay, named the school after Our Lady, 'Star of the Sea' when they moved into a house called "Turret Lodge", which had a clear view of a local bay.

== Principals ==
School Principals
Year	Principal
0000–present	Mary O'Connor
2006–2016	Sandra Diafas
2005	Kathy Smith (Acting)
1991–2005	Rosalie Jones
1968–70, 1982–90	Sr Josepha Dunlop
1972–78, 1980–81	Sr Paschal Rushford
1971, 1979	Sr Patricia Carroll
1950–51, 1957, 1960, 1965–67	Sr Marie Michael Convery
1941–46, 1952–56, 1958–64	Sr Eymard Temby
1947–49	Sr Leonard Gartlan
1935–40	M. Angela Johnston
1919–22, 1929–34	M. Sebastian Lardi
1923–28	M. Agnes Keane
1914–19	M. Magdalen Keogh
1908–13	M. Aloysius Heenan
1883–1908	M. John Byrne & M. Paul Fay

== House system ==
The school has four houses through which students engage in inter-house competition and other activities. The house system dates back to the 1930s, when principal Mother Angela Johnston formed Nagle (blue), named after founder of the Presentation Sisters Nano Nagle, and Stella (red), named for the Latin word for "star". Two additional houses were created in 1948: Ave (yellow) draws its name from the Latin word (in reference to "Ave Maria"), and Fay (green) is named for one of the school's two founders, Mother Paul Fay. Each house has its own crest which symbolises the spirit of the house. From years 10 to 12 students participate in a vertical homeroom system in which students from the same house are grouped together to encourage house spirit.

== Sport ==
Star of the Sea is a member of Girls Sport Victoria (GSV).

=== GSV premierships ===
Star of the Sea has won the following GSV premierships.

- Athletics (8) – 2001, 2002, 2003, 2004, 2005, 2006, 2007, 2008
- Basketball (2) – 2002, 2010
- Cricket (5) – 2004, 2005, 2006, 2007, 2012
- Football – 2010
- Netball (8) – 2005, 2006, 2009, 2010, 2012, 2013, 2014, 2018
- Soccer (6) – 2001, 2003, 2004, 2007, 2008, 2019
- Soccer, 5 a Side (2) – 2015, 2016
- Softball (3) – 2001, 2006, 2007
- Tennis – 2019
- Volleyball (3) – 2008, 2011, 2016

== ANZAC ==
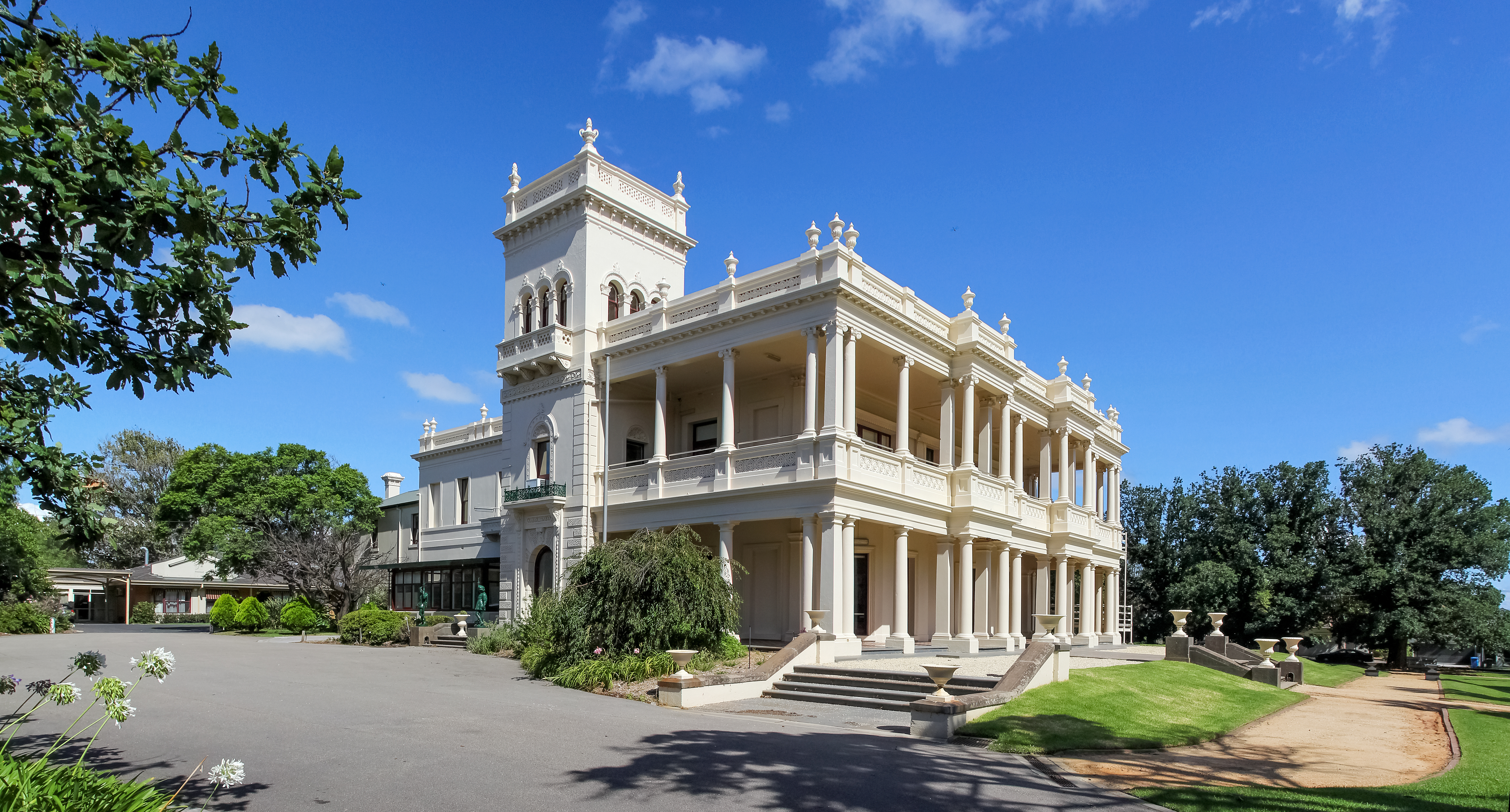
Kamesburgh, the Year 9 campus, in 2007

Named for the Australian war veterans once housed there, ANZAC is Star of the Sea's Year 9 campus. Located in the heritage-listed Kamesburgh Gardens on North Road, Brighton, the forty-room mansion was built in 1874 and presented as a gift to the Repatriation Department in 1919. It served for a time as ANZAC Hostel before the aged care home relocated to an updated facility in 1996. The mansion was then leased by the college, and opened as a Year 9 campus in 1997.

ANZAC retains a close relationship with the hostel, participating in Remembrance Day ceremonies and a "Companions Program" which allows students to engage in weekly visits with the hostel's residents.

The campus has its own system of four houses, each of which are named after well-known battles or military campaigns fought by Australian soldiers: Kokoda, Gallipoli, Long Tan and Tobruk.

== Stacella ==
Stacella is the name of the college's a cappella choir. Founded in 1996, Stacella is composed of over 120 students from years 7 to 12, and has performed for primary schools, nursing homes, local festivals, service organisations and corporate clients. The choir holds an annual concert, in which all students perform the repertoire they have learnt during the year. As well as five tours to New Zealand and a trip Fiji, to date, the choir has also released five CDs.

== Student-exchange programs ==
The school has a student exchange program for German, Italian and Japanese students. Every year girls who are learning a language in the senior years get the opportunity to be part of the student exchange program. Students in years 10 and 11 also are able to go on a study tour to either Italy or Japan.

== Notable alumnae ==
- Nicky Buckley – model and long-serving Sale of the Century hostess
- Dame Carmen Thérèse Callil – critic and writer; founder of Virago Press (finished schooling at Loreto Mandeville Hall)
- Kaye Darveniza – Victorian Labor politician (also attended Shepparton High School)
- Mary Louise Easson – managing director of Probity International; former federal Labor member for Lowe
- Caroline Finch AO – sports injury epidemiologist and prevention researcher
- Sarah Fitz-Gerald AM – former professional squash player; consultant coach at the Victorian Institute of Sport (also attended MacGregor State High School)
- G Flip – musician, singer, songwriter, producer and drummer
- Anna Funder – author
- Ellia Green – Australian rugby union player
- Germaine Greer – feminist academic and journalist
- Rachel Griffiths – actress
- Jacoténe – singer-songwriter
- Gina Liano – barrister and television personality, known for The Real Housewives of Melbourne
- Maureen McCarthy – author
- Elizabeth Miller – Victorian politician
- Caitlin Stasey – actress
- Holly Valance – actress and singer

== See also ==
- List of schools in Victoria
- Victorian Certificate of Education
