= Gwendoline Dooley =

Australian Roman Catholic religious sister and educator

Sister Gwendoline Dooley RSJ
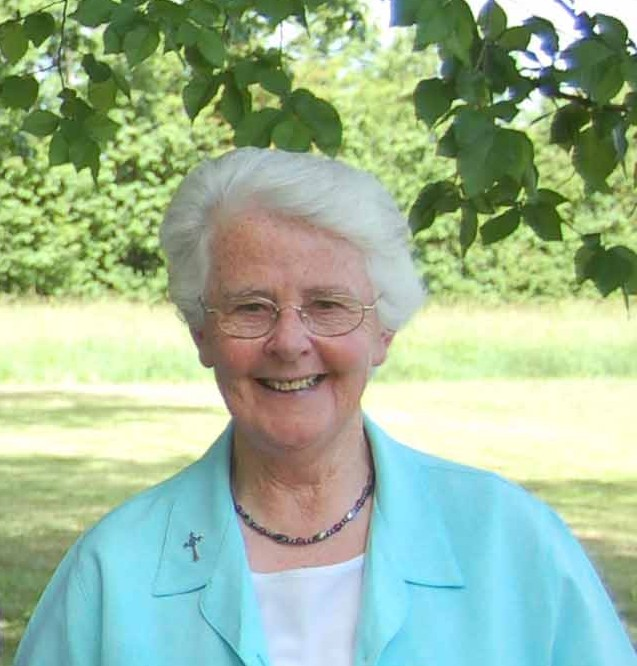
- Sister Gwendoline (Gwen) Dooley RSJ at Clarendon House, Tasmania, in 2007.
- Born: Gwendoline Therese Dooley; 1935; Tasmania, Australia
- Died: 4 July 2015 (aged 79–80); Hobart, Tasmania, Australia
- Resting place: Cornelian Bay Cemetery
- Other names: Sr M Gabrielle of the Annunciation, Sr Gwen
- Occupations: Religious sister, educator, pastoral worker
- Known for: Catholic education and pastoral ministry in Tasmania

Sister Gwendoline Therese Dooley RSJ (1935 – 4 July 2015), commonly known as Sr Gwen Dooley and formerly Sr M Gabrielle of the Annunciation, was an Australian Roman Catholic religious sister, educator and pastoral worker of the Sisters of St Joseph of the Sacred Heart. She taught and worked in Catholic communities throughout Tasmania for nearly sixty years. She belonged to the final generation of Josephite teachers and principals associated with the transition from religious to lay leadership in Tasmanian Catholic schools.

== Early life ==
Gwendoline Therese Dooley was born in Tasmania in 1935, the youngest daughter of James and Geraldine Dooley of Devonport. She was educated at Our Lady of Lourdes Catholic School, Devonport, where she was taught by the Sisters of St Joseph.

She was a great-great-granddaughter of Tasmanian politician James Monaghan Dooley.

== Religious life ==
At the age of 18, Dooley entered the novitiate of the Sisters of St Joseph at New Town in April 1953. She made her profession on 4 January 1956 and received the religious name Sr M Gabrielle of the Annunciation.

In later years she reverted to the use of her baptismal name and became widely known throughout Tasmania as Sr Gwen.

== Educational ministry ==
Sr Gwen spent most of her religious life in Catholic education and parish ministry in Tasmania.

Her teaching and ministry appointments included Smithton, Franklin, Zeehan, Ulverstone, Lenah Valley, Newstead, Geeveston and Rosebery.

She taught at several Josephite schools, including:

- Our Lady of Lourdes Catholic School, Devonport
- Sacred Heart Catholic School, Ulverstone
- Immaculate Heart of Mary Catholic School, Lenah Valley
- Sacred Heart Catholic School, Geeveston
- St Joseph's Catholic School, Rosebery

At Immaculate Heart of Mary Catholic School, Lenah Valley, she served as principal.

During her period of ministry in Ulverstone between 1982 and 1985, she was featured in The Advocate in connection with school sporting activities and coaching.

== Transition in Catholic education ==
Dooley belonged to the final generation of Josephite educators in Tasmania during the transition from religious to lay staffing and leadership in Catholic schools. The official history of Sacred Heart Catholic School, Geeveston records that she was the last Sister of St Joseph to teach at the school, retiring at the end of 1991.

Following her teaching ministry, Sr Gwen worked in parish, spirituality and pastoral roles. From 1998 she served in Moonah parish, at the Sisters of St Joseph Spirituality Centre at MacKillop Hill, Forth, and at St Marys on Tasmania's east coast before returning to Moonah to work at the Emmanuel Centre.

== Later life ==
In late 2013, Sr Gwen moved into an independent living unit at Guilford Young Grove, Sandy Bay. She remained active in community life and attended Tasmanian cultural events including the Taste of Tasmania, Festival of Voices and Dark Mofo.

The Sisters of St Joseph maintained a significant mission presence in Hobart from 1907 through the Josephite Mission at New Town.

== Death ==
Sr Gwen Dooley died on 4 July 2015 in Hobart. After a Mass of Christian Burial at Sacred Heart Church, New Town, she was buried at Cornelian Bay Cemetery.

In his eulogy, Emeritus Archbishop Adrian Doyle gave thanks for her "generous and bright spirit", her dedication to family and congregation, and her service to the Tasmanian Catholic community.
