= Sister Mary Vincent Shelverton =

Australian religious sister and teacher (1925–2003)

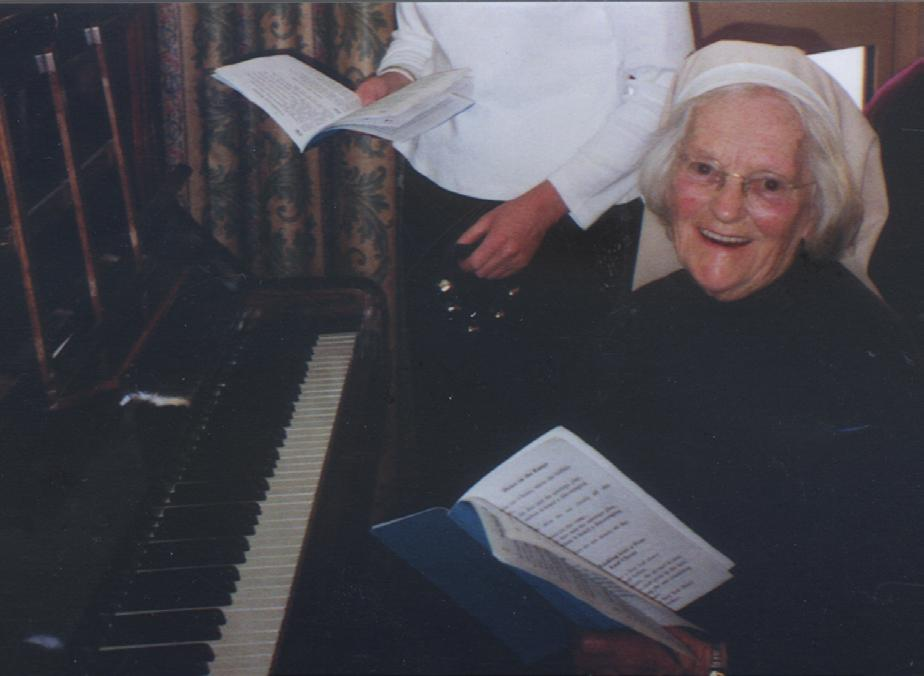
- Sister Mary Vincent Shelverton at piano
- Born: Patricia Bernadette Shelverton; 6 January 1925
- Died: 16 January 2003 (aged 78)
- Education: University of Tasmania (English, Psychology)

Sister Mary Vincent Shelverton (1925-2003) was a Catholic religious sister.

She was born as Patricia Bernadette Shelverton on 6 January 1925 in Hobart, Tasmania, Australia and was professed as a Sister of the Presentation of the Blessed Virgin Mary on 2 February 1945. She served as a dedicated teacher in many Presentation schools and as a Pastoral Sister in many parishes. She died on 16 January 2003 in Hobart.

== Early life ==
Patricia Bernadette Shelverton was the youngest of nine children born to Arthur and Amelia Shelverton. Her brothers and sisters were: Bernard, Mary, Ella, Frank, George, Arthur, Ted and Fr Vincent Shelverton. After their mother died on 29 April 1932, Patricia attended St Mary's College, Hobart.

== Religious life ==
Sr Vincent entered the Presentation Order in Launceston on 2 February 1942 aged 17 and was received in 1943. She was first professed on 2 February 1945. Sr Vincent's final profession was 2 February 1948. Her vocation to the religious life spanned almost 58 years.

Sr Vincent worked as a dedicated teacher in Presentation schools at Launceston, Hobart, Bellerive, Invermay, George Town, Riverside and Zeehan. Her later years as a Pastoral Sister saw her committed to the parishes of Invermay, Lindisfarne, South Hobart and Lenah Valley in Tasmania.

Those later years enabled her to give of her time and talents to many who were aged, lonely and housebound. They enjoyed her musical talents and her presence. She would visit and care for many and travelled to nursing homes and hospitals. Sr Vincent was an advisor to the Society of Saint Vincent de Paul within the parishes where she lived and worked and also was a long-time member of the Human Life Protection Society.

Sr Vincent was a gifted, talented and well educated woman. She gained a Bachelor of Arts from the University of Tasmania in 1970; majoring in English and Psychology. She gained her Associate in Music in 1941 and Licentiate in Music in 1945 and was proficient at the pipe organ.

Her life centered on Jesus in the Eucharist and her devotion to the Blessed Virgin Mary. Sister Vincent died on 16 January 2003 due to complications from an operation.
