= Katherine Bourke =

Australian lawyer and judge

Judge Katherine Louise Bourke

Judge of the County Court of Victoria
- Incumbent
- Assumed office 11 December 2007

Personal details
- Born: 5 July 1961 (age 65)
- Education: O'Neill College; Presentation Convent; University of Melbourne
- Occupation: Judge, lawyer

Katherine Louise Bourke is an Australian lawyer and judge. She has been a Judge of the County Court of Victoria since December 2007.

== Biography ==
Judge Bourke was born in Melbourne on 5 July 1961. She is one of five children, all girls, of Dr John Bourke AM. Bourke was educated by the Presentation Sisters, first at O'Neill College and then at Presentation Convent. She was dux of her school in her final year, and finished in the top hundred students in the state. She subsequently studied Arts and Laws at the University of Melbourne, graduating B.A and LL.B. She later completed a Master of Laws degree from UM; her thesis was Crimes Compensation.

While in secondary school Bourke played cello in the school orchestra and in the State Catholic Schools orchestra. At UM she played competitive soccer, and was a foundation member of the University Women's Soccer Club at UM. After sustaining an injury from playing soccer, Bourke later underwent extensive knee reconstructive surgery.

Bourke completed her Articles of Clerkship at Ford & Co, solicitors (later Nevett Ford) and subsequently worked for that firm as a solicitor and as an associate partner. She was called to the Victorian Bar in 1989, and practiced as a barrister for 18 years, principally in the common law jurisdictions of the Victorian courts, before being appointed to bench of the County Court of Victoria (2007) by the Attorney-General of Victoria, Rob Hulls.

Bourke was appointed Chair of the Bookmakers and Bookmakers' Clerks Registration Committee in 2000. She also served on the Victorian Bar Council from 2000 to 2002.

In 2014 Bourke's younger sister Claire Quin was also appointed a judge of the County Court.

== Horse racing interests ==
Bourke was born into a prominent horse-racing family. Her father was Chief Veterinary Surgeon for the Victoria Racing Club (VRC) for many years. Her paternal uncle, David Bourke CBE, was VRC chairman for 7 years.

Judge Bourke has been part-owner of several race horses and in July 2004 was elected to the committee of the Victoria Racing Club, of which she remains a director.
