= Mother Mary Xavier Byrne =

Australian religious sister (1821–1906)

Mother Mary Xavier Byrne pbvm
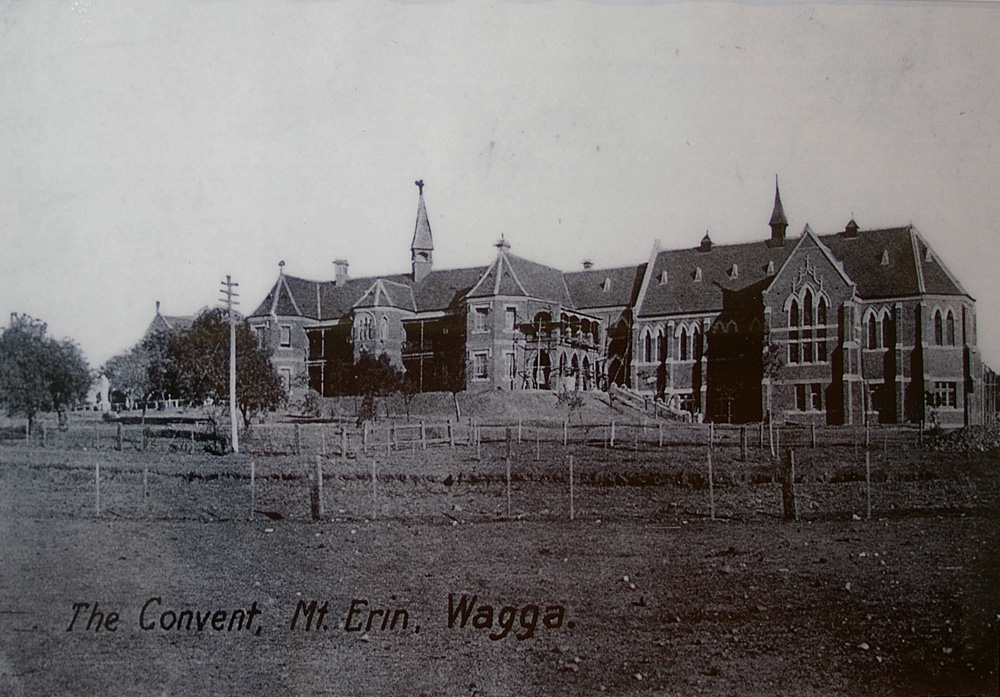
- Mount Erin Convent and Chapel

Personal life
- Born: Anna Maria; 1821 Swords, County Dublin, Ireland
- Died: 21 July 1906 (aged 84–85) Melbourne, Australia
- Parent: John Byrne (father)

Religious life
- Religion: Christianity
- Denomination: Roman Catholic
- Order: Presentation Sisters

Mother Mary Xavier Byrne pbvm (1821 – 21 July 1906) was an Irish-born Australian Presentation sister. She was one of the early pioneering sisters who came to Australia and was the foundress of the Mount Erin Convent in Wagga Wagga, New South Wales.

== Early life and family ==
Mother Mary Xavier Byrne was born in 1821 in Swords, a town north of Dublin in Ireland. Her birth name was Anna Maria Byrne. Her father, John Byrne, came from the village of Ballyboughal in County Dublin. She had a younger sister, who went on to become Mother Mary John Byrne, the Superioress of the Presentation convent in Kildare.

== Religious life ==
Anna Maria Byrne entered the Order of the Presentation of the Blessed Virgin Mary (PBVM) at the Presentation Convent in Carlow. The Presentation Sisters is a religious institute that was established in Ireland in 1775 by Nano Nagle. Historically, the Sisters have focused their energies on establishing and staffing schools that educated young people, especially young women. Byrne was professed on 3rd December 1843 and was given the name Sister Xavier.

In 1856, Byrne was sent to Mountmellick, a town in County Laois in Ireland. At the time, many people there were destitute because of famine and disease. Byrne's financial acumen ensured that funds were sufficient for both the Presentation Sisters to survive and for being able to continue to minister to the impoverished people in the area.

Byrne was one of the founding Presentation sisters who volunteered to come to Wagga Wagga mission from Ireland in 1874, to help establish the order in Australia. The other sisters included her younger sister, Mother John Byrne, Sr Evangelist Kelly, Sr Paul Fay, and Sr Stanislaus Dunne. The sisters travelled by ship from both the Kildare and Mountmellick convents in Ireland. Mary Xavier Byrne became the Reverend Mother of the Mt Erin Convent when the first branch house was opened in Elsternwick in Melbourne, and her sister became the Superioress there.

Mother Mary Xavier Byrne is credited with planning the Mount Erin Convent and further developments of the Mt Erin Boarding School. The Mount Erin Convent was established in 1876 and was the first mother house of the Sisters of the Presentation of the Blessed Virgin Mary in Australia. She is also remembered for her gentle and loving nature.

== Death and legacy ==
Mother Mary Xavier Byrne died suddenly of a heart attack on 21 July 1906 at the Mt Erin convent in Wagga Wagga. When she died at the age of 85, she had been a Presentation Sister for 67 years.

Byrne has been nominated for an entry in the Australian Dictionary of Biography as part of its Colonial Women project.

On 3 June 2024, Australian politician Michael McCormack made a speech in parliament which acknowledged the debt of gratitude owed to the five pioneering sisters. It noted that the work of the Presentation Sisters in Wagga Wagga had made a significant contribution to the education of many generations of Australians in the Riverina region.
