= James Monaghan Dooley =

Australian politician

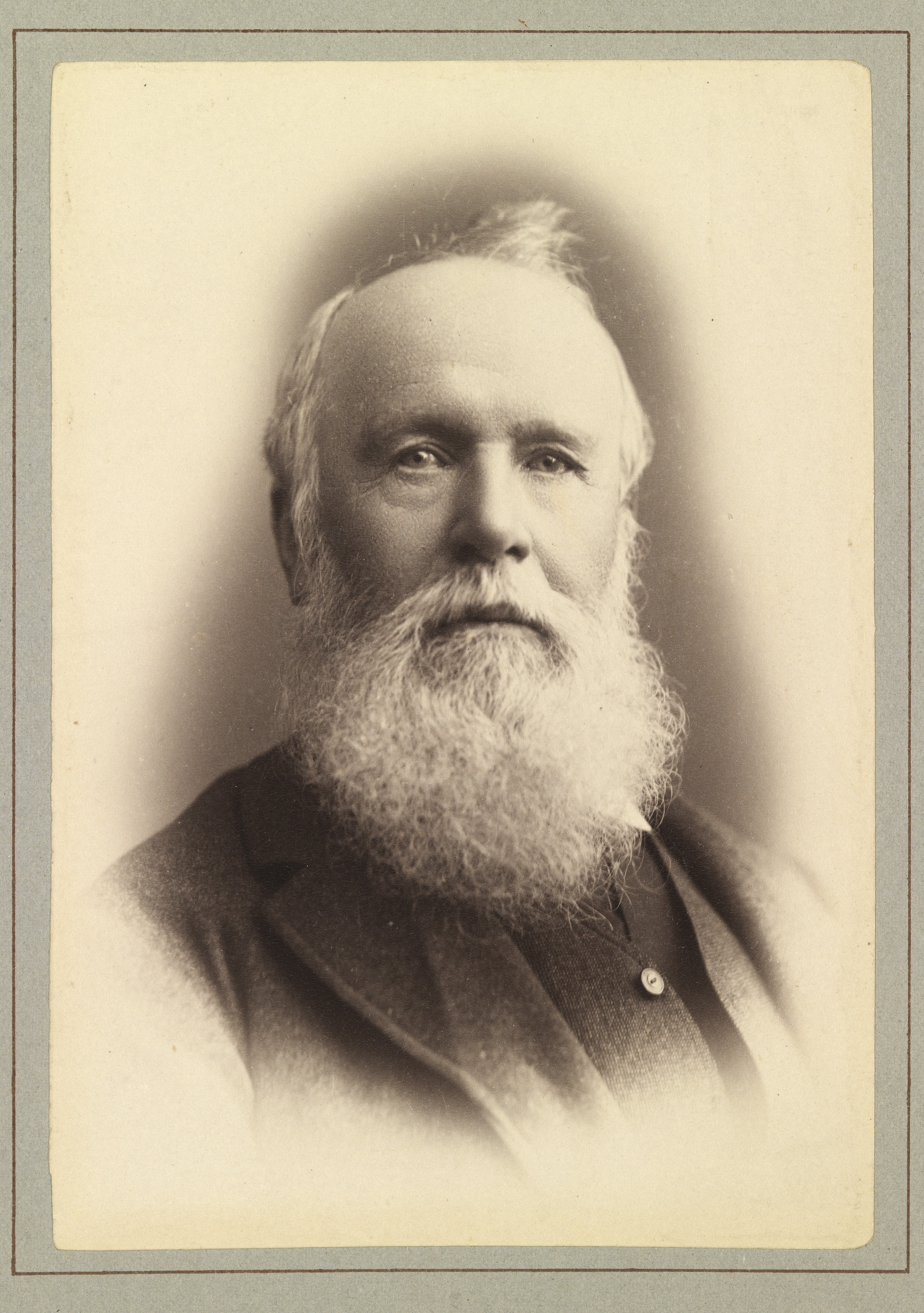

Member of the Tasmanian House of Assembly
- In office October 1872 – February 1891
- Preceded by: Adolphus Rooke
- Succeeded by: John Henry (Australian politician)
- Constituency: East Devon

Personal details
- Born: James Monaghan Dooley; 1 January 1822 County Tipperary
- Died: 5 February 1891 (aged 69) Latrobe, Tasmania
- Spouse: Alice Ainsworth
- Children: Rose, Alice, George Alfred, Eliza, William, James Joseph, and Andrew Joseph

James Monaghan Dooley (1822–1891) was an Australian politician from 1 October 1872 until his death on 5 February 1891.

James Monaghan Dooley was born in County Tipperary, Ireland. He came from a farming background, however he trained in Dublin for a career in surveying. He spent some time working in England and there became involved in survey work for railways, expertise he later brought to the colony of Tasmania. Also whilst there, he met and married his wife, Alice Ainsworth, in Preston, Lancashire.

In 1855, Dooley and Alice came to Tasmania, settling first at Hamilton-on-Forth with their three children. A baby, John Patrick, had died in Dublin before the journey began. Five more children were to be born at Forth, but the eldest, Mary Ann, died there in 1861 of scarlet fever. In 1870 the family moved to Latrobe and lived in Gilbert Street; their home being called 'The Wattles'. Of the family, two daughters (Rose and Alice) remained unmarried; George Alfred died as a young man in Latrobe, and Eliza became a nun in the Presentation Order, later becoming Superior as Mother Mary Xavier. Three sons (William, James Joseph, and Andrew Joseph) were to marry.

Shortly after arriving in Tasmania, Dooley was appointed district surveyor for Tasmania's East Devon, and for the next fifteen years, he worked in this large area of Tasmania’s North West Coast, laying out many of the towns including Latrobe which by the 1880s was the main town in the area.

Dooley demonstrated incredible stamina and bushcraft, and made some epic journeys. In 1863 Surveyor General J. E. Calder commented: "No one is better acquainted with the district than Mr. Dooley is with the one in his charge, and no one in the colony has done so much successfully to push forward settlement than he has."

Dooley entered parliament in 1872, when elected to the Parliament of Tasmania as member for electorate of East Devon. He held the seat in the Tasmanian House of Assembly until his death in 1891. Again he was faced with isolation from his family. He once remarked that it took two weeks to get home to Latrobe, and he thus often spent the entire Parliamentary session in Hobart. Even after the rail link to Launceston was established, it was still a considerable journey. Much later he was responsible for the railway being extended to Latrobe. In these early days, members were further disadvantaged because expenses were not paid to them until 1889.

Dooley was a born politician, possessing a ready Irish wit and a gift of rhetoric. He was never lost for words, however he emerged as a compassionate man who was generous to his Church, and caring for the needs of the struggling early settlers on the North West Coast. He put in place the amenities they needed to carve a living out of the wilderness. It was written of him:

"His Irish affability and his flair for making his constituents feel that he was one of themselves, and above all the shrewdness which enabled him to reconcile the more or less conflicting demands of his electorate and the Liberal faction to which he belonged in Parliament all combined to keep him in Parliament until his death".

When he died suddenly in Gilbert Street, Latrobe in the midst of an election campaign, there was great consternation. A town was in mourning for the: "genial kind old gentleman who had represented East Devon for nineteen years." Never before had Latrobe seen such a funeral. A crowd of 2000 assembled. As well as the many dignitaries crowding into the little chapel, the people of Latrobe from many organisations and religious persuasions assembled in Gilbert Street, and over 1000 people followed the Latrobe Federal Band as the cortege moved to his final resting place in the Latrobe Cemetery.

== Legacy ==
Among his descendants was Sister Gwendoline (Gwen) Dooley RSJ, a Tasmanian educator and member of the Sisters of St Joseph of the Sacred Heart.
