= Sacred Heart School, Launceston =

Sacred Heart School

Location
- Launceston, Tasmania; Australia
- Coordinates: 41°26′24″S 147°08′10″E

Information
- Type: Primary school
- Denomination: Catholic
- Established: 1872; 154 years ago

Sacred Heart School is a Catholic primary school in Launceston, Tasmania, Australia.

== History ==
Sacred Heart College, Launceston, was established in 1872 by the Presentation Sisters. It was co-educational to Grade Two, then girls only to Grade 12. For some years a small number of boarders were taken in by the Sisters. For some years the Sisters taught both girls and boys, including secondary education. Then for some time a gentleman ran the section for young men using the southern end of the buildings. It was not until 1919 that the Christian Brothers came to Launceston to educate the boys. For many years the Sisters were able to run two schools on the site: Sacred Heart College, a fee paying establishment and a parish school, St Mary's School. In 1978, Sacred Heart College amalgamated with St Thomas More's to form Marian College, which catered for Catholic Secondary and Primary School Girls.

Marian College was located in Launceston. It catered for Catholic Secondary and Primary School Girls. It was formed from an Amalgamation of Sacred Heart College, Launceston and St Thomas More's College. The sites of Sacred Heart and St Thomas More's were the two campuses of Marian College. In 1984, Marian College’s Secondary Classes were transferred to St. Patrick’s College. St Thomas More's and Sacred Heart then became Co-ed primary schools in 1984, Becoming St Thomas More's School and Sacred Heart School, Launceston.

== Notable Staff ==
Sister Mary Ursula Grachan OAM (1901–1992), a member of the Presentation Sisters, dedicated much of her life to education at Sacred Heart College in Launceston. She was the first woman to receive a Diploma of Education from the University of Tasmania and held additional qualifications in music and the arts. Known for her excellence in teaching, she introduced Home Science into the school's curriculum, sharing her expertise in dressmaking, needlework, spinning, weaving, pottery, painting, and other crafts. Her contributions extended beyond the classroom; she frequently exhibited her work at the Launceston Show, earning numerous awards in sewing, knitting, and handicraft sections.

In recognition of her service to education, she was awarded the Medal of the Order of Australia in 1981. Sister Ursula remained active in the school community until her later years and is remembered as a "brilliant teacher" by generations of students.

== See also ==
- List of schools in Tasmania
- Education in Tasmania
- Roman Catholic Archdiocese of Hobart
- Catholic education in Australia
