= Teresa Mulally =

- Born: October 1728; Pill Lane, Dublin, Ireland
- Died: 9 February 1803 (aged 74); Dublin

Teresa Mulally (October 1728 – 9 February 1803) was an Irish educationist, businesswoman, and philanthropist.

== Biography ==
Teresa Mulally was born in Pill Lane, near Chancery Street, Dublin in October 1728. She was the only daughter of Daniel and Elizabeth Mulally. When Mulally was young her father retired from being a provisions dealer, and the family moved to Phrapper Lane. Little else is known of Mulally's early life. Her mother was the inspiration for Mulally's philanthropy, with her helping the poor in the severe winters in 1740 and 1741. She moved to live with an elderly relative for four years in Chester in the late 1740s. This relative left her a legacy of £70, and with this money Mulally set up a millinery business, with further dividends allowed her to invest further. She was a capable business women, but after the deaths of both her parents in 1762, she lost interest in the business. She then decided to devote her life to poor, supported by an annual retirement income of £30.

Having abandoned thoughts of joining a convent, Mulally became aware of the lack of education for poor girls in her parish of St Michan's, she opened a charity school on Mary's Lane in 1766 with the help of the Jesuits, Father John Austin and Father James Philip Mulcaile (1727–1801). In June 1766, Mulally and Mulcaile published An address to the charitable of St Michan's parish outlining their plans for school to secure subscriptions from local Catholics. The curriculum had a large amount of religious instruction, but also including reading, writing, arithmetic, glove making, needlework and knitting. Despite facing the possibility of being persecuted under the Penal Laws, Mulally and her assistants, Anne Corballis (d. 1793) and Judith Clinch, taught up to 100 girls. The school expanded in 1771 when Mulally established an orphanage and boarding school.

Mulally became friends with Nano Nagle, having corresponded with her for two years after their first meeting in Cork in September 1778. Her health was in decline, and she became anxious for the Presentation Sisters to take over her school. With this in mind, she began to look for recruits with the aim of setting up a community in Dublin. She continued with these efforts after Nagle's death in April 1784, and concluded with the purchase of disused glassworks in George's Hill near the school in August 1787. This site became a convent in August 1789 with the help of two large bequests and a gift of £1000. A chapel was completed on the site in 1801. It was in April 1794 that two novices professed in Cork, came to Dublin to run the new convent. Two more nuns were received in 1796, one of whom was Judith Clinch.

Mulally did not join the order, but she lived the remainder of her life living in the orphan house beside the convent. From here, she looked after the school finances. She died on 9 February 1803 at the orphan house, and is buried in the vault of the convent chapel. She left most of her estate to the school.
