= School of the Epiphany =

Coordinates: 37°42′57.31″N 122°26′5.31″W

Location
- 600 Italy Avenue; San Francisco, California; United States

Information
- Type: Private
- Motto: Non Vox Sed Votum "Not Words But Deeds"
- Religious affiliation: Roman Catholic
- Established: 1938
- Principal: Brian Joost
- Faculty: 36
- Grades: K-8
- Enrollment: about 300
- Colors: Green and Gold
- Mascot: Eagle
- Website: http://www.sfepiphany.org

School of the Epiphany, colloquially called Epiphany or Epiphany School, is a Catholic school in San Francisco, California. The school opened in 1938 and is named for the Feast of the Epiphany.

== Quick Facts ==
- 94% of the students are baptized Roman Catholics
- Over 80% of the students are members of Parish-registered families. (Note: Of the registered families, only 74% have chosen to act as “Participating Families”)
- 77% of the students come from the immediate area
- 67% of the students are Filipino; 23% are Latino; and 10% are other
- 50% of the students are male, and 50% are female
- 71% of the students come from families that speak a variety of languages in addition to, or instead of, English
- 92% of the students come from families with at least one computer (of which 88% have internet access).

== Facilities ==
The original building, built in 1938, houses the K – 8th grade classrooms (two classrooms per grade, with 30–37 students per classroom), the faculty room, the portable Mac lab, the music room (previously a convent), several bathrooms, and offices for the learning specialist, principal, counselor, and main activity. The halls are decorated with much student work. On the first floor is the awards wall, with "Student of the Month" and various other awards won by the students. The newer building, christened Nano Nagle Hall after the foundress of the Presentation Sisters, was built in 2003. The hall houses athletics awards, a gymnasium, a library, the vending machine room (with two vending machines that are off-limits to students during school hours), and both eighth grade classrooms, one of which is a science lab. Each classroom has at least Three Apple computers that students use for research. The sixth grade lockers are located outside their classrooms in the main building, while the seventh and eighth grade students have lockers in the hallways of their classrooms in the Nano Nagle Hall.

== Communication ==
The school sends out a Wednesday envelope every first and last Wednesdays of the month. In it is the newsletter (the Epiphany Times) and various flyers regarding upcoming events for the school. Each teacher has an e-mail address with the school's server and phone extension; most middle school teachers prefer e-mail as a means of communication, for they are supplied with Apple laptops each year.

All students have online access to their progress reports (when the teachers have updated them) and classroom calendars, which informs one about daily assignments and upcoming tests.

== Student life ==
There are about 300 students. Students start school 8:00 am everyday and school ends at 3:00-3:15 p.m. Before classes start there is a morning prayer and the Pledge of Allegiance which the students recite.

=== Daily Schedule ===
Epiphany starts every school day at 8:00 a.m.. On Mondays, students are let out at 2:00 or 12:35 p.m.; on every other day, classes are dismissed at 3:00-3:15 p.m. Church is attended daily by a class. Four days a week students fill in their day with one of the four following classes: Physical Education, Makerspace, Art, or Spanish.

=== Athletics ===
The sports teams, known as the Eagles, compete in CYO, PAL, and FLAME. There are over 20 teams total for boys and girls at Epiphany. The sports offered at Epiphany include basketball for both boys and girls, along with baseball for boys and volleyball for girls. The sports run fall-winter and winter-spring seasons, the latter being significantly longer.

=== Curriculum ===
The school offers many subjects that get progressively harder each year. Every grade takes math, language arts, religion, science, history, and P.E. In 2000, the school began offering Spanish, as a result of a schoolwide survey on their preference for a language course. Spanish is a class taken Tuesdays to Fridays for grades K to 8.

=== Exploratories & Advisory ===
Epiphany offers a program called Exploratories (similar to high school electives) to the middle school students. Exploratories take place on Tuesday and Thursday afternoons for a grading quarter or semester, depending on the Exploratory. Students make a list of preferences in the last months of fifth, sixth, and seventh grades. Quarter-long Exploratories include Karate, First Aid & CPR, badminton, and Semester-long exploratories include Drama and handbells. In addition, qualified students in all three years of middle school are chosen for the school's Junior High Academic Decathlon team, which takes place of their first semester Exploratory. All middle school students are placed in an advisory with several other of their classmates and a teacher. This is their group for all of middle school; students sign agreements to not reveal anything said in their advisory outside of the advisory time. Generally, advisory activities are team-building and discussion – if no activity is given, the period becomes a study hall.

=== Connection to the parish ===
While most, if not all, current teachers are lay men and women, Catholicism plays a huge role in defining this community. Epiphany's students and teachers regularly attend Mass. Catholic baptized students have their first Holy Communion and Reconciliation in the 2nd grade, along with other students from the parish. Eighth grade students who have received all three of the aforementioned sacraments are then eligible to participate in the sacrament of Confirmation. Students are not required to take these sacraments to pass; however, students are required to take Religion (study of Catholicism) as a class. Starting in the third grade, classes attend 8 AM mass on a specific day, according to grade. Starting at the end of fifth grade, students are invited to become altar servers for the church. The school choir, also known as the Songleaders, include a range of students from the third to eighth grades; the Songleaders sing at school Masses and various church gatherings.

=== Arts ===
All students study music to some extent. Basic instrumental lessons are given to grades 4 – 6 (the recorder), and optionally for 7 & 8 (the handbell Exploratory). Extra piano lessons are offered after school once a week for grades K – 6 (there is a piano in two classrooms, excluding the music room). Everyone is mandated to sing at the school's annual winter caroling concert.

Each year there is an art fair when students display their visual artwork.

=== Other ===
The junior high also takes part in associations such as NJHS and CJSF. All students are encouraged to participate in the school spelling bee, geography bee, and science faire, and students regularly win awards in these competitions. The school also has an active Parents Association. The school has a READ program where, every month, students in all grades turn in their READ folders for prizes ranging from a little trinket to a free ice cream pass. Epiphany has an Extended Care program after hours until 6 PM. During this time, students who are signed up for Homework Club (mostly remedial students) get help with their schoolwork from a junior high student in CJSF or NJHS.
