= Presentation College, Windsor =

Presentation College
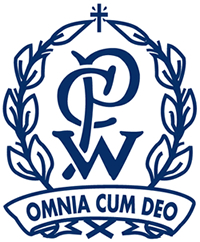

Location
- Windsor, Victoria; Australia
- Coordinates: 37°51′27″S 144°59′41″E

Information
- Type: Independent, day school
- Motto: Latin: Omnia Cum Deo (Everything for God)
- Denomination: Roman Catholic; Presentation Sisters
- Established: 1873
- Closed: 2020
- Principal: Filina Virgato (at closure)
- Years: 7–12
- Gender: Girls
- Enrolment: 153 (at closure)
- Colours: Navy blue and green
- Website: Official website, via Web Archive.

Presentation College, Windsor (PCW) was an independent Roman Catholic, secondary, day school for girls, located in Windsor, an inner suburb of Melbourne, Victoria, Australia. The school was founded in 1873, and closed in 2020. The brother school of PCW was the Christian Brothers College, St Kilda (CBC), located adjacent to PCW.

== History ==
Presentation Convent, Windsor was established upon the arrival of seven Presentation Sisters from Ireland in 1873. Prior to their arrival, from 1839, the Church and colonial government debated the need for education to be provided by local church schools.

The Victorian government wanted to alter the education legislation. It was said that the system of denominational schools was too great a burden on the economy of a young country and left many areas with no access to education. That was resolved following the election of James Wilberforce Stephen to the Victorian Legislative Assembly in 1870, representing St. Kilda. Appointed Attorney-General in 1872, he had responsibility for the proposed Education Bill, which provided for free, secular and compulsory education. After the passage of the bill, financial grants given to denominational schools were discontinued, making the continuation of Catholic schools staffed by lay people financially impossible.

Father Corbett, Parish Priest at St Mary's, East St Kilda, acted quickly and sent a letter to the Presentation Convent in Ireland. It opened in dramatic fashion: "Dear Reverend Mother. From the ends of the earth I write to you for help ..." Responding to the request in September 1873, Sister Mary Paul Mulquin, together with six sisters from Limerick, boarded the steamer, the SS Great Britain, at Liverpool, arriving at Sandridge (Port Melbourne) 21 December 1873.

Presentation Convent Windsor became a reality on Christmas Day 1873. The school commenced in January 1874 with 33 enrolments. By 1883, the enrolment of pupils at Windsor Convent was 367, with 11 sisters and three lay teachers forming the staff.

== Closure ==
On 29 July 2019, it was announced that Presentation College Windsor would close at the end of 2020, due to declining enrolments.

== Lease of Campus to Edmund Rice Education Australia ==
After the closure of PCW, the Presentation Sisters opted to lease the campus to Edmund Rice Education Australia for use by Christian Brothers College (now St Mary's College) for a period of 5 years. In October 2023, Micheal Lee, acting principal of St Mary's College, released a letter to the community informing them that at the end of the lease period, St Mary's will not extend the lease and will instead continue all operations on the Edmund Rice Campus.

== House system ==
The four houses were formed in 1940 by the Principal at the time Mother Bertrand Rahilly, who was very interested in sport and wanted to encourage students to become more active. Within their House girls compete in the Music Festival, Athletics and Swimming as well as participating in other sports.

Mother Bertrand introduced the names of the Houses and allocated the colours:

- Nagle (yellow): After Nano Nagle, founder of the Presentation Sisters
- Kostka (red): After Stanislaus Kostka, renowned Jesuit who died young and came to symbolise youth
- Xavier (blue): After St Francis Xavier, Jesuit missionary and patron Saint of Australia
- Loyola (green): After St Ignatius Loyola, founder of the Jesuits

== Notable alumni ==
- Jana Wendt, journalist
- Katherine Bourke, judge
- Anna Burke, politician
- Sheila Florance, actress
- Clare Oliver, health activist
- Pia Miller, actress
- Lydia Schiavello, television personality
- Matilda Boseley, reporter for 7NEWS and Guardian Australia

== See also ==
- List of schools in Victoria
- Victorian Certificate of Education
