= Mary Xavier Dooley =

Australian religious sister (1858–1929)

Mother Mary Xavier Dooley
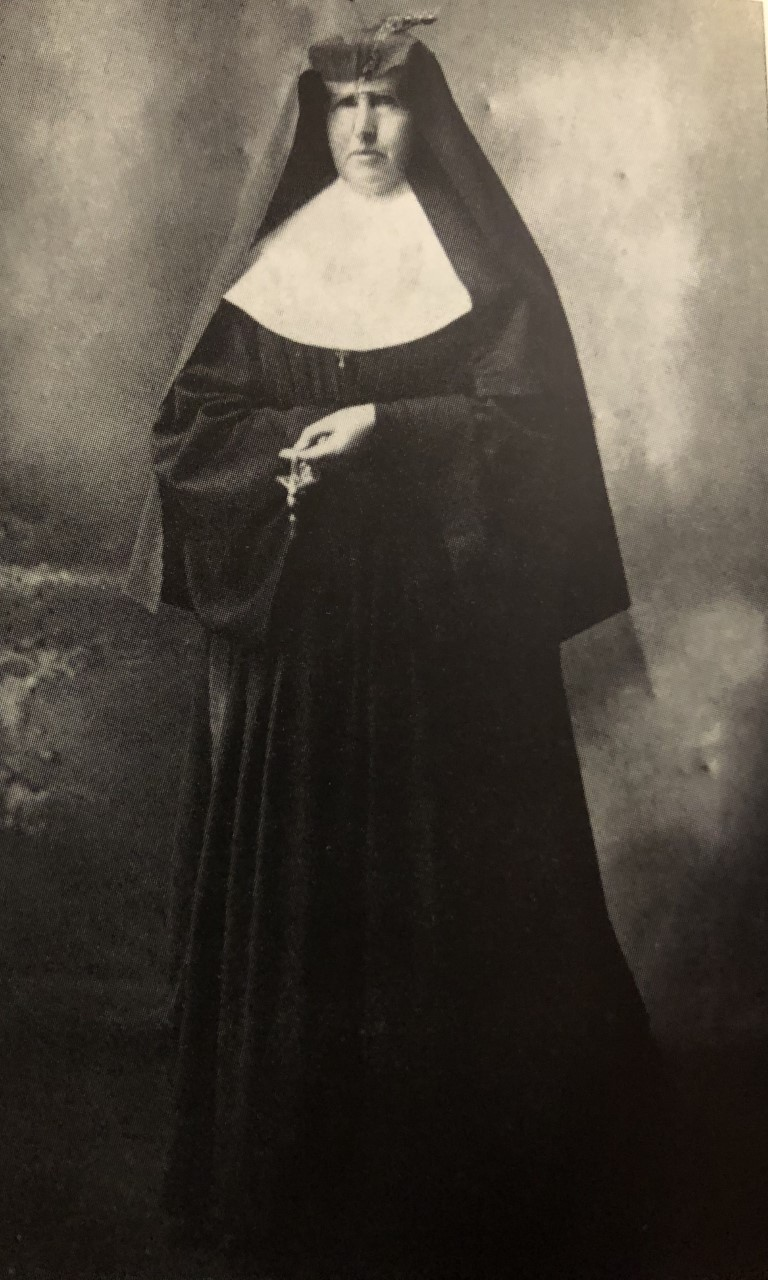
- Mother Xavier Dooley, professed as Presentation Sister on Presentation Day, 21 November 1883.
- Born: Eliza Dooley; June 19, 1858
- Died: July 4, 1929 (aged 71)

Mother Mary Xavier Dooley (19 June 1858 – 4 July 1929) was born Eliza Dooley in Forth, Tasmania, Australia. She was professed as a Sister of the Presentation of the Blessed Virgin Mary in Tasmania in 1883. In 1911, she became the first Superior of the amalgamated Hobart and Launceston Presentation Congregations. She died in Launceston, Tasmania.

== Early life ==
Eliza Dooley was the second daughter of the late Alice and James Monaghan Dooley, of Latrobe. Eliza spent several years as a boarder at the Presentation Convent, Hobart.

== Religious life ==
In 1880 she entered the Novitiate of the Presentation Convent in Hobart; and in 1881 her Superior, Mother Xavier Murphy, sent her to Launceston. In the following year she was received as a novice, and in 1883 she made her religious profession in the Church of the Apostles.

The popularity of the Convent Schools incited jealously in those who were afraid of their success. In the Launceston Examiner, 17 June 1887, Reverend Charles Price of the Tamar Street Congregational Church penned a slanderous letter about the Convent. This led the Convent to file criminal application against Price for defamatory libel. Price withdraw his imputation and the case was dismissed.

In 1896 Mother Xavier Dooley was chosen, along with Mother Bernard Moore, to open St. Columba's School in Launceston. Dooley taught there until 1906, when she was elected Superior of the Launceston Presentation community. She was re-elected in 1909 for another three years. During this time it was proposed that the Hobart community would join with the Launceston community, with one Superior for a Tasmanian Congregation. Launceston was recognized as the Mother House with the Novitiate, and Hobart was to be a filial formation. Dooley as Superior in Launceston automatically became Superior of the first amalgamated Tasmanian Congregation. This change came into effect in 1911.

After leaving the role of Superior, Dooley went back to St. Columba's School for a few years, and in 1923 she was transferred to St. Mary's School, where she worked until her death in 1929.
