= Convent Gallery =

Gallery in Daylesford, Australia

Coordinates: 37°20′31.19″S 144°08′53.86″E

The Convent Gallery is located in the Spa region of Daylesford, in Central Victoria, Australia.

The Convent Gallery's origins date back to the 1860s gold rush, home to the Gold Commissioner, and then known as 'Blarney Castle'. The Catholic Church purchased the building in the 1880s for the local parish presbytery, where it was home to the priest for ten years.

In 1891 Archbishop Thomas Joseph Carr of Melbourne envisaged a "source of light and edification" for the Central Victorian community of Daylesford, Victoria. In 1892, the building was deemed appropriate for nuns and boarders and the Holy Cross Convent and boarding school for girls was opened. It was the first Victorian establishment outside of Melbourne by the Presentation Sisters. In 1904 the new chapel was completed and in 1927 the parlour, dormitory and music rooms were added.

The convent lacked adequate heating and required a large amount of upkeep, inside and out. In the 1970s it was decided that more suitable accommodation should be found for the nuns. The school was closed in 1973 and at the suggestion of the head nun Sister Mary Agatha Murphy, the building was presented in 1975 by the parish of St Peter's to the wider community of Daylesford for its use as a Community Center for arts and education under the direction of a Committee of Management. By the end of 1977, 28 local groups were using it every week with an average weekly attendance of 250 people. It was sold in 1988, needing a great deal of repair and restoration. It was sold to Tina Banitska, a well-known local artist and ceramicist.

The building retains many of its Victorian architectural features, and is located on the slope of Wombat Hill overlooking the Central Highlands twin towns of Daylesford and Hepburn Springs.

The Convent now houses eight individual galleries, featuring new local and international artists every 8 weeks, the original restored chapel, a museum with the history of the building set up by the nuns themselves, retail selling one-off clothing and jewellery pieces, pottery, local wines and produce, a Mediterranean style cafe`, New York style penthouse apartment, two glass fronted architecturally designed function rooms, Daylesford's first world class wine bar, scenic views and 6 acres (24,000 m^{2}) of picturesque gardens.
