= Bertha Southey Brammall =

Australian writer

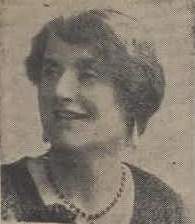
Bertha Southey Brammall Tasmanian writer 1935

Bertha Southey Brammall (née Adams; 10 December 1877 – 10 February 1957) was an Australian writer. A direct descendant of English Poet Laureate Robert Southey, Brammall wrote material for children's radio programs as well as poems, novels and short stories for adults. She was widely considered to be Tasmania's own poet and novelist.

== Biography ==
=== Early life and education ===
Bertha Southey Adams was born in Hamilton-on-Forth, Tasmania on 10 December 1877, one of twelve children of the Rev. Henry White Adams, school teacher and Katherine Adams (née Southey). The family residence, "Westleigh", was built for Edward J. Beecroft and is today an important historical house in the Ulverstone district. Bertha attended the Forth State School, where her nascent literary talents soon become evident, winning her a number of school artistic and writing prizes.

=== Career ===
Her writing career commenced at the age of 18 with the publication of Mate and Moses, a story for children, serialised in the Launceston Examiner from 23 May 1896. A second serial, Fulath, The Fool of the Shadowy Valley, was published the following year by the same newspaper.

Her first novel, Dusky Dell, was published in 1898. Set in northern Tasmania, it tells the story of an orphan taken in by a large family, where she is harshly treated before being rescued by her long-lost parent. Brammall's only full-length novel, The Mystery of Four Corners, was published in serial form in the Weekly Courier in 1923.

Her most productive period as a poet was between the years 1896 and 1907, when many of her poems were published in the Tasmanian Mail, including a number of patriotic Tasmanian poems such as "Tasmania's Soldiers: The Men Who Went and the Women Who Sent them", "Tasmania's Tribute (Our Great National Triumph Song)" and "How the Tasmanians Enthused on Hearing of the Relief of Ladysmith in Hobart, Thursday Night". These poems firmly established her reputation as Tasmanian's national poet. One of her better known poems, "Hinkler in Italy", appeared in The Bulletin in 1933. It commences with the following lines:

High on the shoulders of the Apennines,

Where only grey wolves roam,
They found our Hinkler 'mid the twisted pines,
Ten thousand miles from home.

Only the pale stars, and the wailing winds,
That lay the pine trees low,
Knew where he slept through the long winter nights,

Wrapped in his shroud of snow.

In 1904, she married Thomas Colin Brammall. They moved to Melbourne for a time before returning to Hobart following her husband's appointment as a Master at The Hutchins School. Thomas Brammall was later a tutor at Christ College and was associated with the college and the University of Tasmania until his death in 1945.

In 1928, she began hosting a children's radio program as The Authoress on Hobart's Radio 7ZL, reciting original Australian fairy tales and poems for children. Broadcast twice a week the program was very popular, with Mrs Brammall receiving letters from all over Australia and as far away as New Zealand and South Africa. The program only ended when she left to nurse her sick husband.

She was intensely interested in the theatre and adapted parts of many English classics to the stage, often producing and acting in them herself. In 1934 she won second prize in an Australian Broadcasting Commission play-writing competition with her play, Flickering Candles, one of nearly 400 entries received. The play is a moving narrative of an episode of the convict days in Tasmania. An escaped prisoner takes refuge in the wardrobe of the rector's house. He turns out to be an Oxford man of good family wrongfully sentenced for another's crime. The maid recognises in him the sweetheart she had followed into exile. While the rector's wife is pleading with her husband to marry the couple and help them to escape, the police arrive to search the house. By a clever ruse the police are outwitted and the lovers get their chance to start out together in pursuit of happiness. The play was broadcast on radio 2BL in Sydney on 30 January 1935.

She was a consistent winner in the old Lyceum Club literary circle in Hobart and was a regular contributor of short stories and poems to a number of Australian periodicals and women's magazines.

=== Death and afterward ===
Mrs Brammall died in Sydney on 10 February 1957. She was survived by four sons, two of whom became well-known Australian journalists, Mr C. C. Brammall and Mr Angus Garett Brammall. A fifth son, Bruce, died of tetanus as a young man. Her other two sons were Harry and Thomas.
