= St Mary's College, Hobart =

Coordinates: 42.882°S 147.318°E

St Mary's College

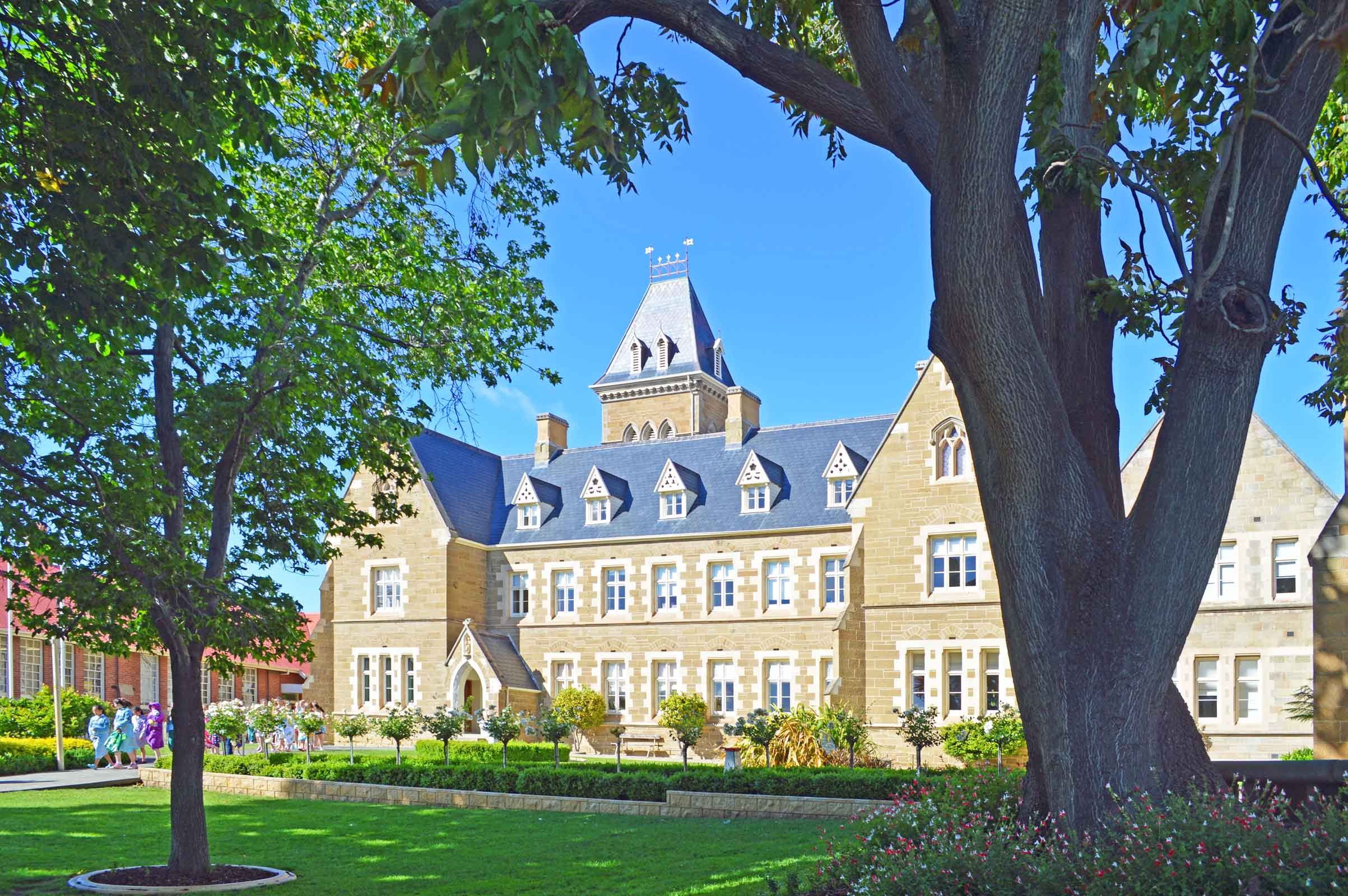
- St Mary's College, pictured in 2014
- Hobart, Tasmania; Australia

Information
- Type: Single-sex, day school
- Motto: God is the Fountain of all Knowledge
- Religious affiliation: Presentation Sisters
- Denomination: Roman Catholic
- Established: 1868; 158 years ago
- Principal: Damien Messer
- Enrolment: ~940 (K–12)
- Colours: Green, pale blue & brown
- Slogan: One Pace Beyond
- Affiliation: Sports Association of Tasmanian Independent Schools
- Website: www.smc.tas.edu.au

St Mary's College is a Kindergarten to Year 12 Catholic, day school for girls, located on the northern city fringe of Hobart, Tasmania, Australia.

A girls' school, St Mary's currently caters for approximately 900 students from kindergarten to Year 12. It is located on the grounds of St Mary's Cathedral, next to the Junior School campus of St Virgil's College.

St Mary's College is a member of the Alliance of Girls' Schools Australia. In 2008 St Mary's College celebrated its 140th birthday as a school of the Presentation Sisters. Its slogan to celebrate this year was "St Mary's College. A proud past. A strong future".

== History ==
The college was founded by the Presentation Sisters in 1868, and although students are no longer exclusively taught by sisters of the order, they still administer the college. Originally there were two schools on the present-day campus – St Columba's (a free primary school for the poorer community) and Mt St Mary's. The two were eventually merged. The original convent and school-rooms are still on-site today.

Although it is primarily an all-girls school, until the opening of St Virgil's College in 1911, the college catered for boys in senior grades as well. The college only taught Preparatory to Grade 12 until 1996, when the kindergarten was opened. Until the 1990s the college's principal was always a member of the order, but the last of the Presentation Sisters to be Principal was Sister Barbara Amott. Sister Barbara was a teacher and has been an active member of St Mary's College for many years, and has been Principal on several occasions. The current Principal is Damien Messer.

== Curriculum ==
St Mary's College is currently implementing the Australian Curriculum in grades Prep–10. All subjects are compulsory in grades 7 and 8. In grades 9 and 10, students choose a certain number of elective subjects, as well as having core subjects. In Grade 11/12, students choose subjects which must add up to a minimum of 700 hours per year. Many of these subjects are prerequisites for university courses.

== Co-curriculum ==
The school offers a variety of after-school activities in both sporting and arts areas. Sports include hockey, badminton, soccer, and rowing. The rowing boat shed is jointly own by St Mary's College, St Virgil's College, and Guilford Young College, and is located in Newtown Bay. Other activities include the Junior and Senior School Choirs, the Senior Choral Group, the Senior Concert and Jazz bands, St Vincent de Paul Society, debating, and public speaking.

In the past, the college held a biannual arts festival, which went for the three days before Hobart Show Day. During this week the students were allowed to choose from a variety of activities that included making jewellery, painting murals, and learning to belly dance. The Long Lunch, a picnic lunch on the school lawns, happened every arts festival, as did "KickArts", a competition in which other local schools entered their rock bands.

=== Sport ===
St Mary's College is a member of the Sports Association of Tasmanian Independent Schools (SATIS).

==== SATIS premierships ====
St Mary's College has won the following SATIS premierships.

- Athletics (2) – 2011, 2012
- Basketball (2) – 2014, 2016
- Hockey (4) – 2016, 2017, 2018, 2019
- Netball (2) – 1991, 1992
- Rowing (2) – 2010, 2011
- Softball (2) – 1999, 2009
- Swimming (3) – 1988, 1989, 1990

== Religion ==
St Mary's College is located next to St Mary's Cathedral. The college celebrates the Catholic liturgical year by attending Mass.

== See also ==
- List of schools in Tasmania
- Education in Tasmania
- Roman Catholic Archdiocese of Hobart
- Catholic education in Australia
