= Albert Hall, Launceston =

Concert hall and convention centre in Launceston, Tasmania

Coordinates: 41.4329°S 147.1415°E

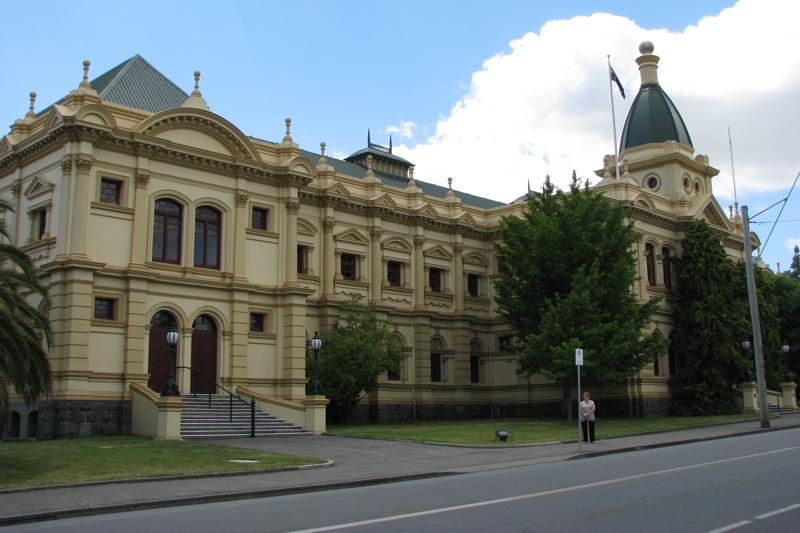
Albert Hall

The Albert Hall is a convention centre in Launceston, Tasmania in the style of high Victorian architecture, first opened as the main structure for the Tasmanian Industrial exhibition which ran from 25 November 1891 to 22 March 1892. It is located on the corner of Tamar Street and Cimitiere Street. It was first listed on the Register of the National Estate on 21 March 1978.

Designed by John Duncan and built by J.T. Farmilo at a cost of 14,000 pounds, it features a large two-level brick-and-stucco hall, containing a historically significant water-powered organ manufactured by the English firm of Charles Brindley c. 1859. The organ was made from blackwood and pine, and its bellows are uniquely lined with kangaroo skin.
