= Forth, Tasmania =

Forth
- Town
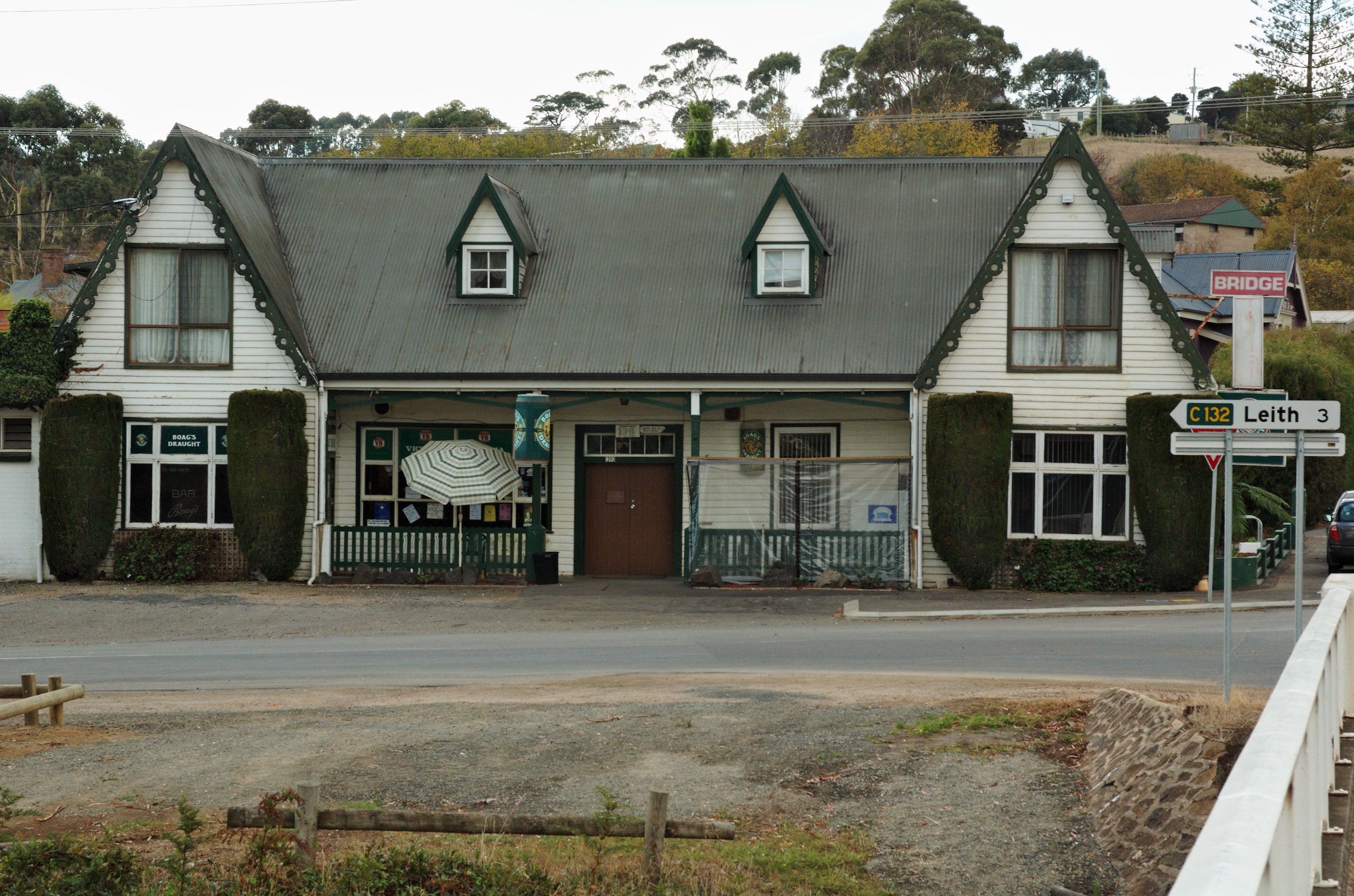
- The Bridge Hotel in Forth

- Coordinates: 41°12′S 146°15′E
- Country: Australia
- State: Tasmania
- LGA: Central Coast Council (75%), City of Devonport (25%)
- Location: 264 km (164 mi) NW of Hobart; 110 km (68 mi) NW of Launceston; 11 km (6.8 mi) W of Devonport

Government
  - State electorate: Braddon
  - Federal division: Braddon

Population
  - Total: 738 (2021 census)
- Postcode: 7310

Forth is a small village in north-west Tasmania on the Forth River, 11 kilometres (7 mi) west of Devonport and 110 kilometres (68 mi) north-west of Launceston via the Bass Highway. It is mainly in the Central Coast Council area, but with just under 25% in the City of Devonport.

Forth has a population of about 738. Previously known as Hamilton-on-Forth, the village predates the larger settlement of Devonport. Nearby is the Forthside Dairy Research Facility run by the Tasmanian Institute of Agricultural Research.

== History ==
James Fenton, a young man of Irish descent came to the Forth estuary in 1839 in search of arable land. Assisted by his hired male companion, he erected the first European edifice in the district, and in 1840 returned to take up permanent settlement. He was soon to be followed by Andrew Risby, his wife and young family and a handful of other settlers seeking a new life.

Fenton expended large sums of money attempting to drain the estuarine swamplands which he hoped would produce ideal cropping fields. This venture failed and he resorted to moving further inland to the rich, although heavily timbered soils of the sloping ground to the west. Fenton is attributed to introducing the practice of ring-barking the large eucalyptus trees to allow light to penetrate the forest floor where the first domestic crops were grown. The district produced fine crops of potatoes in those early years.

Forth Post Office opened on 12 May 1856 (it was known as Hamilton On Forth between 1868 and 1876).

== Notable people ==
- Bertha Southey Brammall (1878–1957), writer
- Mother Mary Xavier Dooley (1858–1929), Australian nun
- Alexander Rud Mills (1885–1964), barrister and author
