= Presentation Sisters =

Religious institute founded in Ireland

The Presentation Sisters, officially the Sisters of the Presentation of the Blessed Virgin Mary, are a religious institute of Roman Catholic women founded in Cork, Ireland, by Honora "Nano" Nagle in 1775. The sisters of the congregation use the postnominal initials PBVM.

The Presentation Sisters' mission is to help the poor and needy around the world. Historically, the Sisters focused their energies on creating and staffing schools that would educate young people, especially young women. Most of these schools are still in operation and can be found across the globe.

As of 2024, the Presentation Sisters are active in 19 countries: Australia, Bolivia, Canada, Chile, Dominica, Ecuador, India, Ireland, Israel, New Zealand, Pakistan, Papua New Guinea, Peru, Philippines, Thailand, United Kingdom, United States, Zambia, and Zimbabwe.

== History ==
=== Beginnings ===
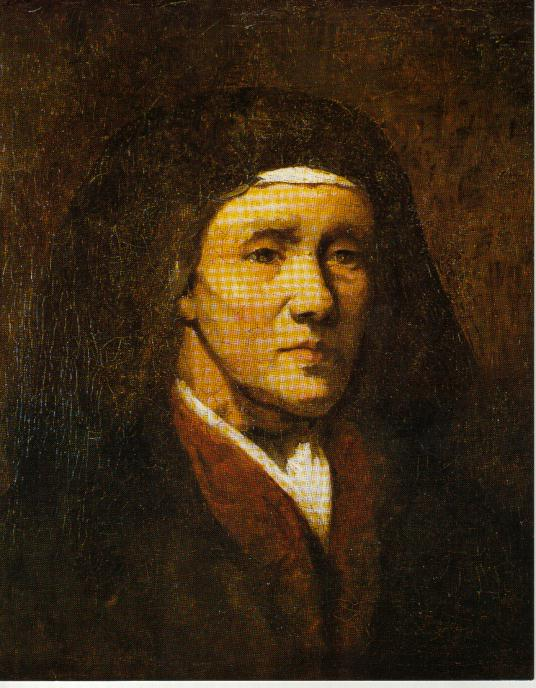
Nano Nagle

Honora (Nano) Nagle (1718–1784) was born in Ballygriffin, Cork, Ireland. Her wealthy Catholic family provided her the advantage of an education in France, at a time when Ireland's Education Act 1695 precluded the less advantaged from education. She quietly began teaching Irish children in the trading port of Cork City, and her reputation spread widely. In a 1769 letter, she wrote: "I often think my schools will never bring me to heaven, as I only take delight and pleasure in them... I can assure you my schools are beginning to be of service to a great many parts of the world."

In 1775, Nagle entered with some companions on a novitiate for the religious life. With them, she received the habit on 29 June 1776, taking the name of "Mother Mary of St John of God". They made their first annual vows 24 June 1777. The foundress had begun the construction of a convent close to that which she had built for the Ursulines, and it was opened on Christmas Day, 1775. They adopted as their title the Society of Charitable Instruction of the Sacred Heart of Jesus, which was changed in 1791 to that of "Presentation Order" (Ord na Toirbhirte). Their habit was similar to that of the Ursulines. Ireland honored the Presentation Order with a pair of postage stamps for the 1975 bicentennial. The Roman Catholic Church declared Nagle a Servant of God in 1994, and Venerable in 2013, on the path toward possible canonization as a Saint.

=== Institutional development ===
The second superior was Mary Angela Collins. Soon after her succession, a set of rules, adapted from that of Augustine of Hippo, was drawn up by Bishop Francis Moylan, and approved by Pope Pius VI in September 1791. This congregation of teaching Sisters itself was given formal approval by Pope Pius VII in 1805.

Communities branching from Cork were founded at Killarney in 1793, Dublin in 1794, and Waterford in 1798. A second convent at Cork was established in 1799, by Mary Patrick Fitzgerald; and a convent at Kilkenny in 1800, by Mary Joseph McLoughlan. The schools, regulated at the time by a United Kingdom Government board, had for their first object the Catholic and moral training of the young, which was not interfered with by the government. The secular system followed was the "National", superseded, in many cases, by the "Intermediate", both of which ensured a sound education in English; to these were added domestic economy, Latin, Irish, French, and German. The average attendance of children in each of the city convents of Dublin, Cork, and Limerick was over 1,200, and that in the country convents between 300 and 400, a total enrollment of 22,200 receiving an excellent education without charge. For girls who needed to support themselves by earning a living, workrooms were established at Cork, Youghal, and other places, where Limerick lace, Irish points and crochet were taught. In 1802, the Sisters' example inspired the formation of the Presentation Brothers.

In 1829 the Presentation Sisters established their first foreign convent, when Josephine French and M. de Sales Lovelock went from Galway to Newfoundland. In 1833 a house was founded by Josephine Sargeant from Clonmel at Manchester, England, from which sprang two more, one at Buxton St Anne's and one at Matlock St Joseph's. The schools were well attended; the number of children, including those of an orphanage, being about 1,400.

India received its first foundation in 1841, when Xavier Kearney and some Sisters from Rahan and Mullingar established themselves at Madras. Soon four more convents in the Madras presidency were founded from this, and in 1891 one at Rawalpindi. These schools comprised orphanages, and day and boarding schools, for both Europeans and local children. The Presentation Sisters entered the Southern Hemisphere in 1866 with a convent and school in Tasmania, Australia.

In the 20th century, foundations were established in Africa (Zimbabwe, 1949; Zambia, 1970) and New Zealand (1951). The first of a new wave of foundations from Ireland in the USA began in Texas (San Antonio, 1952), followed by foundations in the Philippines (1960), South America (Chile, 1982; Ecuador, 1983; Peru, 1993); Slovakia (1992); and Thailand (1999).

== Organization ==
Communities of Presentation Sisters exist throughout the world. However, historical and legal factors caused these communities to develop and operate as autonomous groups. Each community is independent of the motherhouse, and subject only to its own superioress and the bishop of its respective diocese. A large proportion of these communities are today more closely united within the Union of Sisters of the Presentation of the Blessed Virgin Mary, created by papal decree on 19 July 1976. Today, more than 1,600 Sisters pursue work in education and relief of the poor on every continent.

== International Presentation Association (IPA) ==
The International Presentation Association was established in 1988 as a network of the various congregations of PBVM women, including the Union of Presentation Sisters, the Conference of Presentation Sisters of North America, and the Australian Society. The goal of the IPA is to foster unity and to enable collaboration for the sake of mission. The IPA has NGO consultant status with the UN Economic and Social Council.

=== Union of Presentation Sisters ===
The Union of Presentation Sisters is a congregation of 1,300 women working internationally in thirteen Provinces or Units. Each Unit takes responsibility for its own life and mission in response to the direction of the congregation. (The United States Province is also a member of the Conference of Presentation Sisters of North America.)

- English Province
- Indian Province
- Ireland (two provinces: North East, South West)
- Latin America unit
- New Zealand mission
- Pakistan Province
- PBVM Philippines
- Slovakia mission
- Thai Mission
- United States Province
- Vice-Province of Zambia
- Zimbabwe mission

Presentation Sisters in the Pakistan Province founded several notable schools, including Presentation Convent School, Jhelum; Presentation Convent High School, Murree; Presentation Convent School, Peshawar; Presentation Convent Girls High School, Rawalpindi; and Presentation Convent High School, Sargodha. The Indian Province includes Presentation Convent Higher Secondary School, Srinagar, and Presentation Convent Senior Secondary School, Delhi.

Presentation schools in Ireland include High Cross College (formerly Presentation College, Currylea); Cashel Community School (formerly Presentation Convent, Cashel); Our Lady's College, Greenhills; Presentation College, Athenry; Presentation College Headford; Presentation Secondary School, Clonmel; and Killina Presentation Secondary School, Rahan. In Ireland, the Presentation Sisters also founded Clann Credo, a social investment fund.

=== Conference of Presentation Sisters of North America (CPS) ===
The Conference of Presentation Sisters of North America began in August 1953 under the title of the "North American Conference", when several Presentation communities in North America began to collaborate and communicate on issues of ministry, spirituality and social justice. All of these communities claim their origins from Nano Nagle. In 2002, the North American Conference included eight communities, and changed its name to CPS. Together the eight communities established a collaborative ministry project in New Orleans called "Lantern Light".

==== St. John's, Newfoundland ====
The first Presentation Convent in the Americas was founded in Newfoundland in 1833 at the request of Bishop Michael Anthony Fleming, Vicar Apostolic of the island. The convent and a neighboring school were established in St. John's, Newfoundland, by Mary Bernard Kirwan, accompanied by Mary Xavier Molony, Mary Magdalen O'Shaughnessy, and Mary Xaverius Lynch. The motherhouse was established adjacent to the Basilica of St. John the Baptist. As of 2019, the congregation was serving twelve ministry locations in Newfoundland.

==== San Francisco, California ====
In November 1854, five Presentation Sisters arrived in San Francisco from Ireland at the invitation of Archbishop Joseph Sadoc Alemany. Mary Joseph Cronin was appointed as the community's first superior; but due to unforeseen circumstances, she returned to Ireland in 1855 with two other members of the small community, Clare Duggan and Augustine Keane. The remaining Sisters were Mary Teresa Comerford, who assumed the role as new superior, Xavier Daly, and their first postulant, Mary Cassian. The Sisters had great difficulties in their early founding years, but succeeded in interesting prominent Catholics of the city in their work. By 1900, the San Francisco Presentation foundation established two convents and schools within the city limits named Presentation High School, San Francisco, and one in Berkeley, California named Presentation High School, Berkeley. They also staffed schools in Gilroy and Sonoma, California. The Presentation Sisters opened San Francisco's School of the Epiphany in 1938, and Menlo Park's Nativity Catholic School in 1956.

Presentation High School San Francisco was an all-girls school. The most-recent main building was constructed in 1930 at 2340 Turk Street. In 1991 the building became University of San Francisco's Education Building.

In nearby San Jose, California, the Presentation Sisters opened Presentation High School in 1962. The school still operates as an all-girls Catholic high school.

In Sacramento, California, the Sisters staffed a pair of K–8 schools for 30 years each: Presentation School during 1961–1991, and Saint Mary School during 1969–1999.

==== Dubuque, Iowa ====
The congregation was introduced into the Diocese of Dubuque by Mother Mary Vincent Hennessey in 1874. By 1913, the congregation had established ten branch-houses in neighboring Nebraska.

==== Staten Island, New York ====
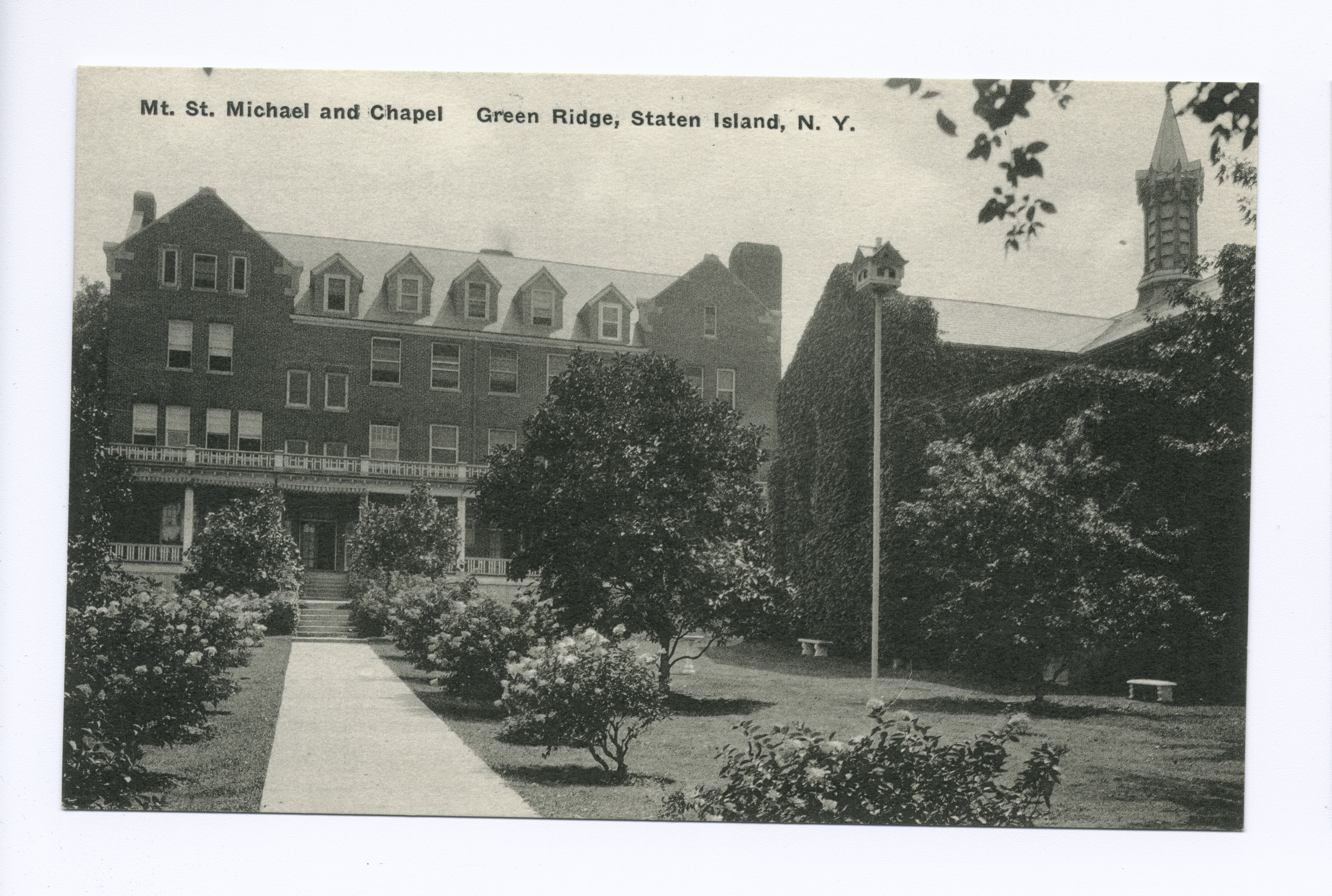
St. Michael's Home (Staten Island motherhouse until 1945)

The Presentation Convent of St. Michael's Church (New York City) was founded on 8 September 1874, by Mother Mary Joseph Hickey of the Presentation Convent, Terenure, County Dublin, with two Sisters from that convent, two from Clondalkin, one from Tuam, and five postulants. Father Arthur J. Donnelly, the founding pastor of St. Michael's Church as its school building neared completion, went to Ireland in February 1874 to invite the Presentation Sisters to take charge of the girls' department. Upon the Sisters' agreeing, Paul Cardinal Cullen, Archbishop of Dublin, applied to the Holy See for the necessary authorization for the Sisters to leave Ireland and proceed to New York, which was accorded by Pope Pius IX. In 1884, Mary Joseph Magdalen, Mary Teresa Reynolds, and four other Sisters from the New York group took charge of St. Michael's Home, Greenridge, Staten Island, where soon hundreds of destitute children were cared for. This became the home of the newly established Sisters of the Presentation of Staten Island, which became its own congregation on 1 May 1890. (Others from the early New York community developed into today's Presentation Sisters of New Windsor.)

In 1921–1922, the Staten Island congregation began educating young local students at St. Ann's Church, St. Clare's Church, and Our Lady Help of Christians. By the 1950s, a dozen locations were served by more than 120 Presentation Sisters of Staten Island, larger than any other Presentation community in their first two centuries. In the 1960s, they were instrumental in establishing Countess Moore High School. Founded in 1962 as an all-girls school, in September 1969 it became co-educational and later changed its name to Moore Catholic High School.

In 1945, the Staten Island motherhouse moved from St. Michael's Home in Greenridge to the former "Horrmann Castle" atop Grymes Hill, and finally in 1965 to a new convent next to the old Greenridge property. As their numbers later dwindled, the Sisters downsized the convent and property in 2010, and began moving toward a long-term partnership with the New Windsor community.

==== Fargo, North Dakota ====
The Fargo, North Dakota community was established in 1880 under Mary John Hughes, and took charge of a free school, home, and academy. Fargo's Presentation Sisters merged into the Union (U.S. Province) in 2013.

==== Aberdeen, South Dakota ====
In 1886, some Sisters from Fargo went to Aberdeen, South Dakota, and, under the guidance of Mary Joseph Butler, took charge of schools at Bridgewater, Bristol, Chamberlain, Elkton, Jefferson, Mitchell, Milbank, and Woonsocket, as well as two hospitals. In 1922, what was eventually named Presentation College opened in Aberdeen. The college primarily educated nurses for the northern portion of South Dakota.

==== New Windsor, New York ====
In 1886, Mary Magdalen Keating, with a small group of Sisters, left New York at the invitation of Philip Joseph Garrigan (later Bishop of Sioux City, Iowa), to take charge of the schools of St. Bernard's Parish, Fitchburg, Massachusetts. The mission flourished and established other foundations in West Fitchburg and Clinton, Massachusetts; Central Falls, Rhode Island; and Berlin, New Hampshire. In 1997, the Sisters of the Presentation of Fitchburg, Massachusetts, and the Sisters of the Presentation of Newburgh, New York, united to form one congregation, now based in New Windsor, New York.

==== Union of Presentation Sisters (U.S. Province) ====
A new wave of foundations from Ireland in the USA began in 1952. In 1976, in response to the invitation of Vatican II, a number of autonomous Presentation congregations came together as one congregation. This new congregation was established by papal decree on 19 July 1976. Its full title is: The Union of Sisters of the Presentation of the Blessed Virgin Mary. As of 2015, member communities were those of:

- Robertsdale, Alabama (1979)
- Phoenix, Arizona (1989)
- Cypress (1963), Huntington Beach (1966), Los Angeles (1978), Montclair (1959), Oakland (2003), Orange (1965), San Bruno (1970), Upland (1955), California
- New Orleans, Louisiana (1991)
- DeGraff, Minnesota
- Long Beach (1994), and Shaw (2010), Mississippi
- Fargo, North Dakota (three: starting 1880)
- San Antonio, Texas (two: 1952, 2001)
- Chimbote, Peru

=== Presentation Society of Australia and Papua New Guinea ===
In 1946 the major superiors of the seven Presentation congregations in Australia agreed on common constitutions. In 1958 Pope Pius XII approved the formation of the Society of the Australian Congregations of the Presentation of the Blessed Virgin Mary.

==== Tasmania ====
On 20 July 1866, four professed Sisters and five postulants set out from Fermoy, Ireland, to Tasmania, Australia. They boarded The Empress at Queenstown, Ireland, and arrived at Hobart three months later to open, at Richmond, the first Presentation convent and school in the Southern Hemisphere. The group was led by Francis Xavier Murphy, whose brother Daniel Murphy was Bishop of Hobart and later its first Archbishop.

The Presentation Sisters' Tasmanian presence expanded over the following years. In 1871 they opened St Mary's College, Hobart, the first Catholic boarding school in Australia. In 1873 Hobart established its first foundation in Launceston. Led by Francis Xavier Beechinor, the founding sisters were four Irish-born and two born in the colony. Gabriel (Teresa) Horner was the first Australian to join the Sisters.

After copper was discovered in Queenstown on the west coast of Tasmania, Archbishop Murphy wanted a convent and school to be set up there. In January 1899, four Presentation Sisters from the Hobart Community sailed to Strahan, then by train to Queenstown. On 16 January 1899, St Joseph's School was opened with 65 children attending. The sisters were led by Mary Paul Boylson.

In 1911 the Convent houses of Launceston and Hobart amalgamated, led by Mother Mary Xavier Dooley. She was born in Tasmania to Alice and James Dooley, and she was educated at St Mary's College, Hobart.

The Launceston foundation saw the development of a school at Invermay, and St Finn Barr's Church School was opened on 14 January 1894 under the leadership of Mary Patrick Hickey. The Launceston community made four more foundations: Beaconsfield, Karoola, Lilydale and Longford. St Francis Xavier's School at Beaconsfield was opened on 23 April 1899 led by Mother Mary Paul Boylson and three other sisters. Hearing of the successful work of the Presentation Sisters, the Irish settlers of Karoola petitioned the Sisters to open a convent and school. In 1902, Magdalen Riordan and novice Aquin Darling started St Margaret's school with 50 children in attendance. In 1953 a new convent dedicated to the Sacred Heart was built. In 1891 Archbishop Murphy laid the foundation of St Anne's Church, Lilydale, which was opened in January 1892. In 1903 St Monica's convent was opened at Longford. Attached to the convent was a large classroom that closed in 1911.

In 1929 a holiday house was purchased by the Sisters at Blackmans Bay. The original farmhouse later became Maryknoll, a prayer House set up by Betty Bowes in 1979.

In 1935 a new parish was established in Bellerive and the Presentation Sisters were asked to make a foundation there. By the end of 1935, Corpus Christi Church-School and convent had been erected. In 1938 the sisters taught at St Cuthbert's Church-School. On 13 March 1949, Archbishop Tweedy offered the Presentation Sisters a foundation at New Norfolk. St Brigid's School was opened on 4 January 1926 and taken over by the Presentation Sisters in 1950. In 1956 Archbishop Young approached the Presentation Sisters to open a convent and school at George Town. In 1957 Sisters Gabriel and Bernadette opened Stella Maris, a Church-School with 64 pupils.

In February 1959 the Presentation Sisters accepted the invitation to open St Anthony's school at Riverside, a suburb of Launceston. The Presentation Sisters were in charge of the school from its inauguration, with Clare as the first principal. In 1961 the Poor Clare Sisters arrived and in 1962 a new school block was completed. When the Poor Clares withdrew in 1971, the Presentation Sisters agreed to return. Sister Mary Vincent Shelverton was Head Teacher from 1972 to 1981. In 1961, Our Lady Help of Christians school was begun at Newnham with 52 children.

The first off-shore foundation was made in 1963 on King Island. By the end of the year, the sisters were giving religious instruction to 200 children all over the island. In 1962 a request was made by the Franciscan missionaries to make a foundation in the Aitape Vicariate, Papua New Guinea. In 1988 the Presentation Sisters requested to minister on Flinders Island and Cape Barren Island.

In 1981 Sister Mary Ursula Grachan received the Order of Australia Medal for "service to education", personally awarded by Queen Elizabeth II at Albert Hall, Launceston.

==== Victoria ====
On 21 December 1873, six Sisters and a postulant arrived in Melbourne from Limerick to found a convent and school at St Kilda, the summer resort for the growing capital of the newly established colony of Victoria. The current congregation leader for the Presentation Sisters of Victoria is Helen Carboon.

==== Western Australia ====
The party of Presentation women who arrived in Geraldton, Western Australia in July 1891 was made up of three Sisters and one postulant from Sneem, one Sister from Mitchelstown, one postulant from Tipperary and three from Cork.

==== New South Wales ====
In May 1874, five Sisters arrived in Wagga Wagga from Kildare, including Mother Mary Xavier Byrne; and in August 1886, three Sisters and seven postulants from Lucan arrived in Lismore. Sisters from Wagga Wagga established new foundations in Elsternwick (1882), Hay (1883) and Longreach (1900). From Hay, a group travelled in 1900 to the goldfields of Western Australia. This group formed a union with the Geraldton Congregation in 1969.

==== Australian Presentation Schools ====
- Assumption Catholic Primary School, Mandurah, Western Australia
- Avila College in Melbourne
- Domremy College, Five Dock, New South Wales
- Holy Cross Convent, Daylesford, Victoria (now, The Convent Gallery)
- Iona Presentation College, Perth
- Iona Presentation Primary School, Perth
- Marian College, Myrtleford
- Mary Immaculate College, Sutherland (merged into the former Christian Brothers College, now St Patrick's College, Sutherland)
- Mt St Patrick's College, Murwillumbah, New South Wales
- Nagle Catholic College, Geraldton, Western Australia
- Nagle College, Bairnsdale, Victoria
- Nagle College, Blacktown, New South Wales
- Presentation College, Moe; and Presentation College, Newborough; now merged into Lavalla Catholic College, Victoria
- Presentation College, Windsor, Victoria
- St Anthony's School, Riverside, Launceston, Tasmania
- St Carthage's Primary School, Lismore, New South Wales
- St John's Regional College, Dandenong, Victoria
- St Joseph's Primary School, Como/Oyster Bay, Sydney, New South Wales
- St Mary's College, Hobart, Tasmania
- St Mary's College, Lismore, New South Wales (now, Trinity Catholic College)
- St Mary's Star of the Sea Catholic School, Carnarvon, Western Australia
- St Patrick's College, Sutherland, Sydney, New South Wales
- St Rita's College, Clayfield, Queensland
- St Ursula's College, Yeppoon, Queensland
- Star of the Sea College, Brighton, Victoria
- Star of the Sea College, George Town, Tasmania

== Watervliet, New York ==
The Presentation Sisters of Watervliet, New York established their community in 1881. They elected not to join the Conference of Presentation Sisters of North America, and Watervliet remains an independent congregation.
