= Nano Nagle =

Pioneer of Catholic education in Ireland (died 1784)

Venerable Nano Nagle PBVM
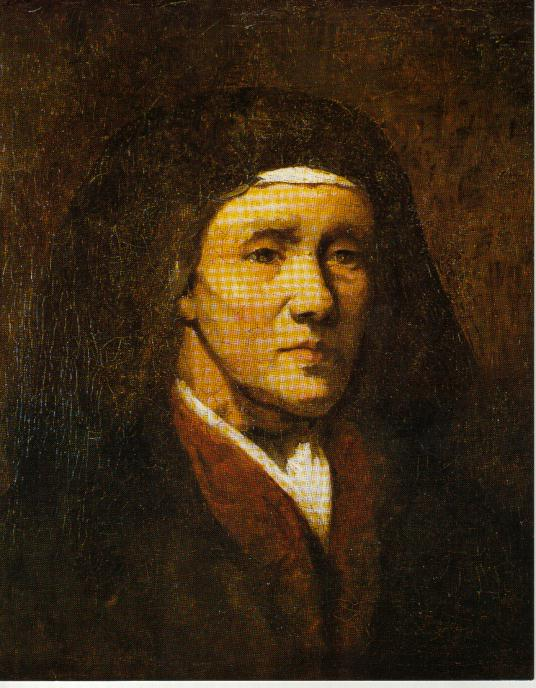
- Portrait of Nano Nagle attributed to James Barry

Virgin
- Born: Honora Nagle c. 1718; Ballygriffin, County Cork, Ireland
- Died: 26 April 1784 (age 65); Cork, Ireland

Honora "Nano" Nagle (c. 1718 – 26 April 1784) was an Irish Catholic religious sister who served as a pioneer of Catholic education in Ireland despite legal prohibitions. She founded the Sisters of the Presentation of the Blessed Virgin Mary, commonly known as the Presentation Sisters, now a worldwide Catholic institute of women religious. She was declared venerable on 31 October 2013 by Pope Francis.

== Background ==
Nano Nagle lived during the period when the Catholic majority in Ireland were subject to the anti-Catholic Penal Laws. The Catholic Irish were denied political, economic, social and educational rights that would have lifted them from mass poverty. The parliamentarian and philosopher Edmund Burke, a younger cousin of Nagle who spent part of his childhood in her birthplace, described those laws: "Their declared object was to reduce the Catholics in Ireland to a miserable populace, without property, without estimation, without education."

== Early life ==
Nano Nagle was born in Ballygriffin, in the parish of Killavullen, County Cork, to Garrett and Ann (née Mathew(s) or Matthew(s)) Nagle. Though her exact date of birth is unknown, and the year of her birth disputed, Nagle is most likely to have been born in 1718. The name "Honora" given at baptism was soon replaced in the family circle by the affectionate name "Nano". She was the eldest of six or seven children, the others being Mary (omitted in many sources), Ann, Catherine, Elizabeth, David, and Joseph.

Nagle was born in the Blackwater Valley in County Cork which possesses views of the distant Nagle Mountains. Much of this region was once the property of the Nagle family. Originally known as "de Angulo" or "D'Angulo", they were connected to some of the most prominent local families, and their ancestors had lived in the area for hundreds of years. However, after the Williamite War in Ireland, the Nagle (as they were now known) family's loyalty to the exiled Catholic King James II led to many of their ancestral lands being confiscated by the government. However, when Nagle's parents married, the family still owned considerable property at Ballygriffin, Killavullen. Garret's brother Joseph kept it in nominally Protestant hands so that the family could retain it under the Penal Laws.

Nano Nagle is believed to have attended a local hedge school, like her cousin Edmund Burke, before she travelled to France to complete her education. The Education Act 1695 banned Catholic schoolteachers in Ireland, while also prohibiting overseas travel for Catholic education. Nagle relatives with strong connections in France arranged for Nagle and her sister Ann to travel to Paris, perhaps smuggled in a cargo ship. They finished their schooling and Nagle enjoyed a busy social life in Paris – "balls, parties and theatre outings, all the glamour of the life of a wealthy young lady." After one of these parties, "she noticed a group of wretched-looking people huddled in a church doorway" and was struck by the contrast with her privileged life.

== Work with the poor ==
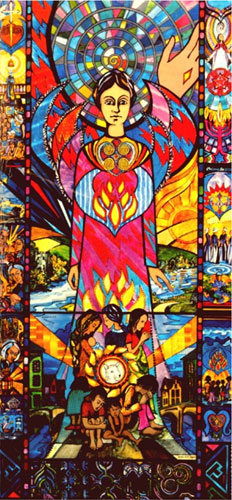
Image of Nano Nagle in St Patrick's College, Sutherland, Australia

After her father's death in 1746, Nagle and her sister joined their mother in Dublin, witnessing further poverty. Their mother died soon after, and Nagle returned to Paris intending to enter an Ursuline convent, but a religious director advised her to help the poor of her own country instead. She returned to Cork, where her brother Joseph was living, and established her first school for the poor in 1754, "in a rented mud cabin in Cove Lane, in defiance of the law, and in complete secrecy at first, even from her brother." He discovered her secret when a poor man came begging for Nagle to accept his child into her school. "Her brother was very angry with her at first, because of the risks involved, but later became reconciled and gave her his full support."

Nagle's first school opened with about 30 students, and this is now the site of South Presentation convent. At first alone, and later with the support of her family, particularly her uncle Joseph Nagle who had used Protestantism to preserve the family's wealth, she established a network of Catholic schools in Cork. Not everyone in Cork welcomed the initiative: "She was insulted in the street on occasion, and her pupils were dismissed as 'beggars' brats'." Within nine months, she was educating 200 girls. Within a few years, she had opened seven schools, five for girls and two for boys. These provided pupils with a basic education and religious instruction.

She described in a letter her ideas for education, and how she wanted the spiritual and temporal welfare of her pupils to be interwoven and to flow naturally together.

Nagle "began to visit the sick and the elderly after school, bringing them food, medicine and comfort." She went from hovel to hovel each day to gather the neediest people to teach. Nighttime ministries to poverty-ridden elderly and sick in her hometown gave Nagle the nickname The Lady with the Lantern. The lantern later became the symbol of the Presentation Sisters worldwide.

== Institute of Charitable Instruction of the Sacred Heart of Jesus ==
As her workload increased, Nagle realised that she would need help with her work. In 1767, she stayed with the Ursuline Sisters in Paris while visiting her cousin Margaret Butler, who had been professed the previous year. In 1771, Nagle sponsored the first Ursuline convent in Ireland, a community of four women in Cork city who were professed in Paris, together with a reverend mother. However, they were unable to educate the poor widely, because at that time Ursulines were required to remain enclosed in their convents.

Nagle and her assistants continued their work without becoming an established religious congregation, so they were free to work for the poor without being enclosed. On Christmas Eve 1775, she founded the Society of Charitable Instruction of the Sacred Heart of Jesus, in Cork, the first convent of what would later be the Presentation Sisters. She resisted the local bishop when he expressed fears that the establishment of the convent might provoke a Protestant backlash. She received the habit on 29 June 1776, taking the name of "Mother Mary of St John of God". The sisters made their first annual vows on 24 June 1777.

== Legacy ==
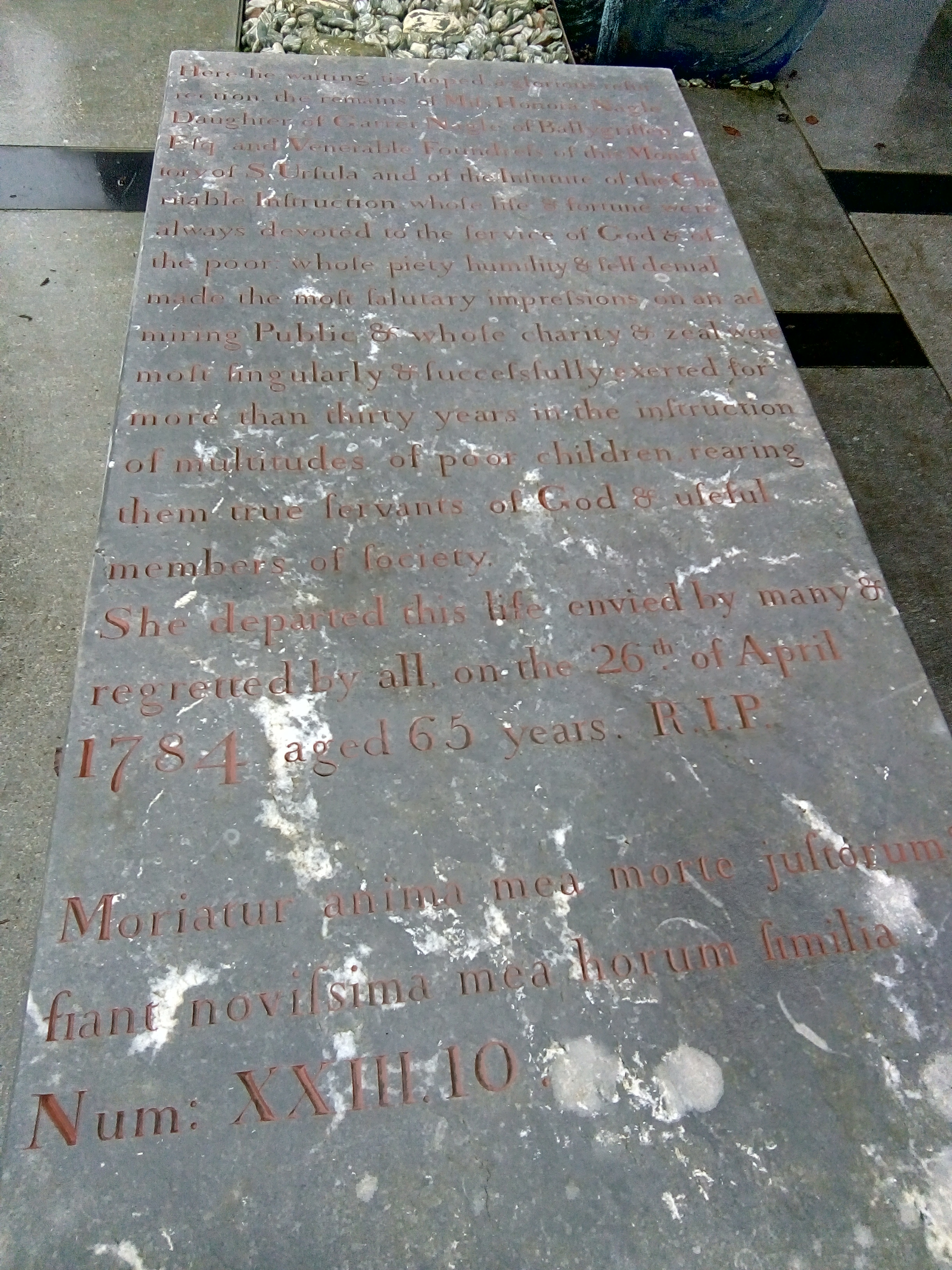
Nagle's original tombstone

Nagle died from tuberculosis on 26 April 1784 in Cork city, at age 65. By then she had established links with Teresa Mulally, who had founded a Catholic girls school for Dublin's inner-city poor. In 1794, a group of women who had helped with Mulally's projects in Dublin joined with Nagle's Cork group who had been renamed the Sisters of the Presentation of the Blessed Virgin Mary in 1791. Today, congregations of the Presentation Sisters exist all over the world. In 1854, sisters travelled from Ireland to San Francisco, California, and within two weeks opened the first of many schools in the United States. In 1866, another group sailed from Ireland to Tasmania, establishing the first of many Presentation convents and schools in Australia.

In 2000, Nagle was voted Irish Woman of the Millennium, "in recognition of her importance as a pioneer of female education in Ireland." In a 2005 radio poll, she was voted Ireland's greatest woman ever. She inspired Edmund Ignatius Rice, the founder of the Christian Brothers, to bring education to the poor people. The Presentation Sisters became one of Ireland's prominent Catholic teaching orders along with the Ursulines, Sisters of Mercy, Christian Brothers, and Presentation Brothers. The Presentation order has spread to two dozen countries worldwide. Some of the schools founded by the Presentation Sisters are named after Nagle, and her teachings are still followed today. Ireland also honoured her with a pair of postage stamps for her order's 1975 bi-centenary, and with a 1985 footbridge across Cork's River Lee. Nano Nagle Place, surrounding her original 1771 convent in Cork city, includes her tomb, museum, and archive.

The Roman Catholic Church officially opened Nagle's cause for beatification in 1984, the bi-centenary of her death. She was declared a Servant of God in 1994, and Venerable on 31 October 2013.

A sculpture of Nagle, titled Nano and the Children, was unveiled at her birthplace in Ballygriffin in 2009. It was created by sculptor Annette McCormack and depicts Nano as "The Lady with the Lantern".
