= East Tamar Highway =

Highway in Tasmania, Australia

East Tamar Highway Tasmania
- Coordinates: 41.0578809°S 146.7913888°E (South end); 41.4398722°S 147.1341352°E 41.4390033°S 147.1357261°E (North end)

General information
- Type: Highway
- Length: 56.2 km (35 mi)
- Route number(s): A8; Launceston – Low Head
- Former route number: State Route 1

Major junctions
- South end: York Street / West Tamar Highway; York Street / West Tamar Highway; Bathurst Street; Wellington Street; Launceston, Tasmania
- Brisbane Street/ West Tamar Highway; Brisbane Street / West Tamar Highway; George Town Road; Batman Highway; Bridport Road
- North end: Low Head Lighthouse; Low Head, Tasmania

Location(s)
- Major settlements: Dilston, Hillwood, George Town, Low Head

Highway system
- Highways in Australia; National Highway • Freeways in Australia; Highways in Tasmania

The East Tamar Highway is a highway in Tasmania, Australia. It covers the eastern edge of the Tamar River, from Launceston to the lighthouse at Low Head.

It is labelled as route A8, but prior to 1980 was signed as State Route 1.

Plans for a high-speed East Tamar Highway date back to the 1950s.

== Upgrades ==
The East Tamar Highway has had a majority of upgrades since the 1950s to it.

=== East Tamar Outlet ===
The East Tamar Outlet is a dual carriageway that starts from Invermay to the Dilston Bypass. It bypasses Mowbray, Alanvale and Newnham. The dual carriageway previous went on Mowbray Link, then University Way, now bypasses all of those roads.

=== Dilston Bypass ===
The Dilston Bypass is a bypass that starts/ends from the East Tamar Outlet to John Less Drive. It replaces the old route going to Dilston. It opened in 2011.

=== Mowbray Link Roundabout ===
In 2018 or 2019, roadworks was settled near Mowbray Link and the East Tamar Outlet constructing a new roundabout replacing the multiple slip lanes T interchange connector.

== Route description ==
=== East Tamar Outlet (Launceston to Dilston) ===
The highway leaves the Launceston CBD then goes through Invermay then leaves Invermay after the last pair of traffic lights. The East Tamar Outlet has a few intersections as a roundabout, a T-interchange and a trumpet interchange.

=== Dilston to George Town ===
After the East Tamar Outlet, the Dilston Bypass begins then ends at an intersection. There are many overtaking lane opportunities from the Dilston Bypass to the roundabout of where Bell Bay Road starts. The highway goes through many bushes and bridges with another trumpet interchange as the Batman Highway intersects with the East Tamar Highway. It goes through more bushes, bridges and intersections. The highway goes onto a roundabout then goes on a bridge over the Bell Bay Railway Line then enters George Town.

=== George Town to Low Head ===
After leaving George Town, the highway is entirely narrow after leaving the town of George Town with many intersections. The highway ends where the Low Head Lighthouse is.

== Major intersections ==
Four shielded routes terminate at the intersections of streets in the Launceston CBD. Because all the involved streets are one-way each route has separate inbound and outbound termini. One of these routes is the East Tamar Highway. Distances from each terminus to a point on the route may not be identical. Those shown below are from the outbound terminus.

LGA	Location	km	mi	Destinations	Notes
Launceston	Launceston	0	0.0	West Tamar Highway (Brisbane Street) (A7) – from southwest – Trevallyn / Midland Highway (Bathurst Street) (National Highway 1) – from southeast – South Launceston / Brisbane Street to Tasman Highway (A3) – northeast – Newstead	Southern end of East Tamar Highway. Road proceeds north west as Bathurst Street.
Launceston	Launceston	0.25	0.16	Cimitiere Street – northeast – Launceston	No northbound entry from or southbound exit to Cimitiere Street
North Esk River		0.9– 1.0	0.56– 0.62	Charles Street Bridge	
Launceston	Invermay	1.6– 1.7	0.99– 1.1	Forster Street – east and west – Invermay	
Launceston	Mowbray	3.2– 3.5	2.0– 2.2	Mowbray Link – northeast – Mowbray	Roundabout
Launceston	Newnham	4.9– 5.2	3.0– 3.2	University Way – northeast – Newnham	
Launceston	Rocherlea	8.5– 9.1	5.3– 5.7	George Town Road (B81) – southeast – Scottsdale	Trumpet interchange
Launceston	Dilston	10.6– 10.9	6.6– 6.8	John Lees Drive (C742) – northwest – Dilston	
Launceston	Dilston	18.1– 18.2	11.2– 11.3	John Lees Drive (C742) – southwest – Dilston	
Launceston	Swan Bay / Dilston midpoint	20.6	12.8	Windermere Road (C739) – west – Windermere	
George Town	Mount Direction / Hillwood midpoint	25.5	15.8	Dalrymple Road (C809) – northeast – Mount Direction	
George Town	Hillwood	27.4	17.0	Hillwood Jetty Road (C727) – southwest – Hillwood	
George Town	Hillwood	31.6– 32.4	19.6– 20.1	Batman Highway (B73) – west – Sidmouth / East Arm Road (C810) – southeast – Mount Direction	Trumpet interchange
Fourteen Mile Creek		33.4	20.8	Bridge over creek (name not known)	
George Town	Bell Bay	44.9	27.9	Bridport Road (B82) – east – Bridport	
George Town	Bell Bay	45.9	28.5	Bell Bay Road (C853) – south – Bell Bay	Roundabout
George Town	Low Head	56.2	34.9	End of highway – road continues to Low Head Lighthouse	Northern end of East Tamar Highway
1.000 mi = 1.609 km; 1.000 km = 0.621 mi: Incomplete access

== See also ==
- Highways in Australia
- List of highways in Tasmania
- List of highways in Launceston, Tasmania
- List of bypasses in Tasmania
