= Beechford, Tasmania =

Beechford
- Town
- Coordinates: 41°02′S 146°57′E
- Country: Australia
- State: Tasmania
- Region: Launceston
- LGA: George Town
- Location: 22 km (14 mi) NE of George Town; 37.0 km (23.0 mi) from Bridport; 49.7 km (30.9 mi) from Scottsdale; 48.0 km (29.8 mi) from Launceston

Government
  - State electorate: Bass
  - Federal division: Bass

Population
  - Total: 90 (2016 census)
- Postcode: 7252
Localities around Beechford
Bass Strait	Bass Strait	Stony Head
George Town	Beechford	Stony Head
George Town	George Town	Lefroy

Beechford is a rural locality in the local government area (LGA) of George Town in the Launceston LGA region of Tasmania. The locality is about 22 kilometres (14 mi) north-east of the town of George Town. The 2016 census recorded a population of 90 for the state suburb of Beechford. It is a small beach side village on the northern coast of Tasmania, 48.0 kilometres (29.8 mi) north of Launceston. Beechford is also the place where the Curries River joins up with the Tasman Sea in Bass Strait. The village is surrounded by farmland, and land administered by Crown Lands, the Department of Defence, and Parks and Wildlife, creating a natural corridor of unbroken sea views. This beautiful part of Tasmania, with its warm, relatively dry micro-climate and stunning beach and conservation areas, is still "undiscovered" by tourism, leaving visitors to enjoy the area relatively undisturbed.

Once a populated town with its own small shop (closing some time during the mid-1980s) when there were many more permanent residences, Beechford now has no store: the closest shops are in the regional centre of George Town.

Beach access is via a small sand track near the now-defunct football oval, or over a small foot bridge that crosses a tidal estuary. The coastline and white sandy beach is used for walking, mountain biking, snorkeling, kite surfing, swimming and fishing. Local swimming conditions, typical of the central coast of the Bass Strait, are normally calm and relatively warm, though conditions should be checked with Beachsafe.org. Kite surfing conditions are excellent due to the laminar air flow produced by the positioning of the beach in relation to Low Head.

Since the area has been declared a part of the Five Mile Bluff conservation area, visitors are advised that use of vehicles on the beach, except to launch and retrieve a vessel, is now illegal: the National Parks and Reserved Land Regulations 2009 (TAS) allows for fines of up to 20 penalty points (i.e. more than $3000) to be issued for infringements. The beach and coastline is monitored by a Parks and Wildlife ranger.

The turnoff to Beechford is found on the Georgetown to Bridport Road through Lefroy, a small settlement that was once an important gold mining centre in Tasmania. Alternately, visitors may take Dalrymple Road (C809) from the East Tamar Highway (A8), or turn east from A8 just before Hillwood onto Bullocks Head Road, which leads directly to the Bridport Highway and then intersects with the Beechford turnoff. Beechford itself lies just south of the military training area of Stony Head.

== History ==
Beechford was gazetted as a locality in 1966.

Beechford Post Office opened in 1966 and closed in 1970.

== Geography ==
The waters of Bass Strait form the northern boundary, and Curries River the eastern.

== Road infrastructure ==
Route C807 (Beechford Road) enters from the south-east and runs through to the village in the north-east, where it ends.
