= Pipers Brook, Tasmania =

Pipers Brook Tasmania
- Coordinates: 41°05′04″S 147°10′56″E
- Population: 93 (2016 census)
- Postcode(s): 7254
- Location: 33 km (21 mi) E of George Town
- LGA(s): Launceston, Dorset, George Town
- Region: Launceston, North-east
- State electorate(s): Bass
- Federal division(s): Bass
Localities around Pipers Brook:
Weymouth	Bellingham	Bridport
Pipers River, Retreat	Pipers Brook	Golconda
Retreat	Lebrina	Golconda

Pipers Brook is a rural locality in the local government areas of Launceston, Dorset and George Town in the Launceston and North-east regions of Tasmania. It is located about 33 kilometres (21 mi) east of the town of George Town. The 2016 census determined a population of 93 for the state suburb of Pipers Brook.

== History ==
The locality was named for Ensign Hugh Piper, a member of William Paterson's expedition to the Tamar in 1804. It was gazetted as a locality in 1961.

== Geography ==
Pipers River forms the north-western boundary. Pipers Brook (the watercourse) flows through from south to north and then forms a section of the northern boundary.

== Road infrastructure ==
Route B82 (Bridport Road) passes through from west to east. The C818 route (Pipers Brook Road) starts at an intersection with B82 in the centre and runs south through the locality and village before exiting. The C852 route (Bellingham Road) starts at an intersection with B82 in the centre and exits to the north.
