= Bridport Road =

Road in north-east Tasmania, Australia

Bridport Road Tasmania
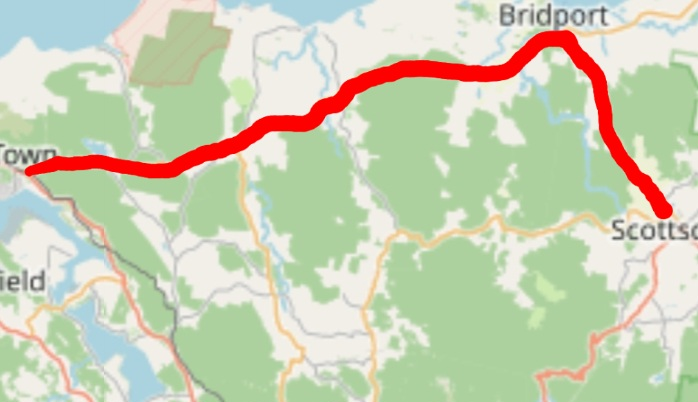
- Route of Bridport Road
- Coordinates: 41.1594572°S 147.5187824°E (West end); 41.1201680°S 146.8788003°E (South East end)

General information
- Type: Road
- Length: 69 km (43 mi)
- Route number(s): B81 B84

Major junctions
- West end: A8 East Tamar Highway (Bell Bay)
- B83 Pipers River Road B81 Golconda Road
- South East end: A3 King Street (Scottsdale)

Location(s)
- Region: Dorset
- Major suburbs: Pipers River,

Bridport Road is a road in Tasmania, Australia, that directly goes from Scottsdale to Bridport and from Bell Bay to Bridport. The route changes before 1 kilometre ahead of an intersection on the B82 route nearby the newly constructed Caltex petrol station.

There are two separate routes as B82 and B84 that shares the same Road name although doesn't go through Bridport.

Roadworks were sited between Bell Bay and past Lefroy in 2026.

== Route (B84) ==
From a T-junction intersection begins Bridport Road from the Tasman Highway, it goes through parts of Scottsdale and then leaves the town while going on hilly sections of the road but staying as a completely straight road, most of the route is completely rural then goes through bushes as of Jetsonville, then goes through completely rural areas again before going to Bridport.

== Route (B82) ==
From a T-junction intersection, the road starts from the East Tamar Highway, then goes over the Bell Bay railway line, then most of the route is completely surrounded by trees and bushes before seeing gravel and sealed roads, after that, the road goes to Pipers River. After leaving Pipers River, it is completely rural again but with no trees and bushes but some will come around, the road meets a short cut road called Jarvis Link which takes drivers into Bridport, the route continues and ends up on a T-junction intersection but continues, the road ends on another T-junction intersection.
