= Hebe (1803 ship) =

Coordinates: 41°03′42.92″S 146°45′18.90″E

History

British India
- Name: Hebe
- Builder: Breen, Chittagong, India
- Launched: 1 October 1803 (Note: One source gives the year as 1804, but that is in error.)
- Fate: Wrecked 15 June 1808

General characteristics
- Tons burthen: 250, or 300 (bm)

Hebe was a 250-ton full-rigged ship launched in 1803 at Chittagong. She struck a reef between Low Head and Western Head on the entrance to Port Dalrymple, Tasmania, Australia, on 15 June 1808, and became a total loss.

Hebe was carrying a cargo of Indian goods from Madras to Sydney, Australia when she was wrecked. All the crew except for one lascar escaped drowning and returned with the ship's master, Joseph Leigh, to Sydney aboard Estramina on 11 October 1808.

== See also ==
- Low Head Lighthouse
- Shipwrecks of Tasmania
