= Noland =

Noland may refer to:

- Noland (surname)
- Noland (Oz), a fictional region near the Land of Oz
- Noland Bay, an Australian body of water
- Noland (Pokémon), a character in Pokémon Emerald and Pokémon Platinum video games
