= Austin Australia =

Building organisation based in Sydney, Australia

- Company type: Defunct
- Industry: Construction
- Founded: 1961
- Founder: The Austin Company
- Defunct: March 2004
- Headquarters: Sydney
- Key people: Sam Richardson (1st CEO); Robert J. Harrison (2nd CEO); Edward T.F. Last (3rd CEO); Thomas Gervay (4th CEO).
- Revenue: $93 Million (2003)
- Number of employees: 130 (2003)
- Website: www.austin.au.com

Austin Australia was a Sydney, New South Wales, Australia, based 'design and construct' building organisation, specialising in complex buildings. It was originally formed in 1961 as a wholly owned subsidiary of The Austin Company, Cleveland, Ohio, initially under the name of Austin Anderson Pty Ltd, it changed its name to Austin Australia in 1982. With headquarters in Sydney and branches in Melbourne, Brisbane, Perth, Adelaide and South-East Asia, The Austin Company retained ownership of Austin Australia until 1997, when it was acquired by private Australian ownership. However, it retained an affiliation status with The Austin Company in the USA

== Business model ==
Austin Australia's core activities were specialist design, consulting, architectural, engineering, project management and construction services for high-profile manufacturing clients in Australia and SE Asia for forty-three years between 1961 and 2004, including major production facilities for Kelloggs, Sanitarium, Borg-Warner, Pilkington Glass, Procter & Gamble, Wella, Nestle, Denso, Toyota and National Foods. The company also designed and constructed hotels, including Ibis and Formule 1 hotels for Accor, the Bankstown International Hotel; and communications facilities for Australian Associated Press and the Australian Broadcasting Corporation and more.

The company's other diverse activities included:

- Mineral Processing and Minerals Exploration (1965–1990), with major projects for Newmont, EZ Industries and Alcoa.
- Forest Products (1970–1980), including the APPM wood chip mill at Long Reach, Tasmania (1970–1972), reputed to be the largest in the world at the time.
- Petro-chemicals (late 1960s – late 1980s), major projects for Dow Corning, Esso, Mobil and BFGoodrich.
- Physical asset management improvement services and products (2002–2003), carried out by associate company Austin Pragma.

== Liquidation ==
Austin Australia was placed into voluntary administration on 31 December 2003 and went into liquidation on 10 March 2004, with debts now amounting to A$23 million according to the Liquidator's Report to Creditors (31 March 2011, page 4). The major causes listed in the Liquidator's Report to Creditors (dated 27 February 2004) were: tight profit margins which turned profitable jobs into losses (p2); lengthy legal proceedings on five projects (p2); inadequate business systems (pp. 9–10); and low capital base relative to turnover (p8). The Liquidator, Ernst & Young, Sydney, sold the Melbourne and South East Asia branches and dissolved the remainder of the company, including both its principal Engineering and Construction divisions (based in Sydney). The Melbourne branch evolved into APDD Pty Ltd, whilst the South East Asia branch (based in Singapore) became Austin-SEA and now has close links with Austin-UK.

A Judgment of the Supreme Court of New South Wales on 2 November 2007 determined that Austin Australia was trading insolvent as early as 30 June 2003.

The settlement of the liquidation was heavily delayed by a long-running arbitration dispute with Auburn Council, for whom Austin Australia built the Auburn Civic Centre in 2003. The dispute was settled in Austin's favour in 2009. However, the Austin Estate then became involved in a dispute with Hillcrest Litigation Services, the company which had funded Austin's legal campaign against Auburn Council (Liquidator's Report to Creditors (17 March 2010, p. 3). This matter was not resolved until 2011. During the liquidation process, a number of companies which had provided services to Austin Australia prior to its collapse were pursued by the liquidator to refund substantial sums of money under Unfair Preference legislation. However, the Liquidator advised creditors in its Annual report to creditors dated 31 March 2011 (pp. 3–4), that the legal processes involved with retrieving the money had "negatively impacted the net result to the estate."

The Liquidator consistently advised that former employees of the company would receive a partial dividend of their entitlements but that no other creditors will receive payment. Employees waited eight years and fifty-two days in the hope of receiving a substantial portion of their entitlements. Their hopes were dashed when the Liquidator's "First and Final Priority Dividend" to former employees was mailed to them on 20 February 2012, providing them with a meagre 3.7% dividend on leave entitlements and 0% dividend on redundancy pay.

The Liquidation process is expected to be formally wound up in by April 2012.
