= Stony Head =

- Town
- Coordinates: 41°01′12″S 147°00′59″E
- Country: Australia
- State: Tasmania
- Region: Launceston
- LGA: George Town
- Location: 29 km (18 mi) NE of George Town

Government
  - State electorate: Bass
  - Federal division: Bass

Population
  - Total: nil (2016 census)
- Postcode: 7252
Localities around Stony Head
Bass Strait	Bass Strait	Bass Strait
Beechford	Stony Head	Lulworth, Weymouth
Beechford	Lefroy	Pipers River

Stony Head is an Australian Army artillery range and training centre in the local government area (LGA) of George Town in the Launceston LGA region of Tasmania. The range locality is about 29 kilometres (18 mi) north-east of the town of George Town. The 2016 census recorded a population of nil for the state suburb of Stony Head.

== History ==
Stony Head is a confirmed locality.

The Australian Army has used the site as an artillery range since 1966. The Australia Government formally acquired the area in 1997. The host unit for the range was 16th Field Battery, Royal Australian Artillery, an Australian Army Reserve unit based in Tasmania until 2013. Maintenance and facility construction is undertaken by the Royal Australian Engineers. It has also been used by the 2nd Force Support Battalion reserves and local Australian Army Cadets units.

In 1969 a dirt airstrip was constructed capable of landing Royal Australian Air Force Caribou transport planes that was later extended to accommodate the C-130 Hercules to provide supply missions to the range. It has been used occasionally by local flying clubs via arrangement with the military.

== Geography ==
The waters of Bass Strait form the north-western and northern boundaries.

Public access to the coastal beach areas is possible but inland has a significant risk from unexploded ordnance. The public is discouraged from moving further inland and there is a fence built around the most dangerous part of the range with guard patrols during exercises.

The range includes the location 41°0′0″S 147°0′0″E, one of the points included in the Degree Confluence Project, which aims to visit and photograph all the points with coordinates of Y°0′0″, X°0′0″. The project was refused permission to visit this point, because of the danger of unexploded ordnance.

== Road infrastructure ==
Route C807 (Beechford Road) passes the locality to the west. From there access is provided by an unnamed road.
