= Retreat, Tasmania =

Retreat
- Town
- Coordinates: 41°09′31″S 147°10′20″E
- Country: Australia
- State: Tasmania
- Region: Launceston
- LGA: Launceston, George Town
- Location: 40 km (25 mi) E of George Town

Government
  - State electorate: Bass
  - Federal division: Bass

Population
  - Total: 18 (2016 census)
- Postcode: 7254
Localities around Retreat
Pipers River	Pipers Brook, Pipers River	Pipers Brook
Pipers River	Retreat	Lebrina, Pipers Brook
Pipers River	Tunnel	Tunnel

Retreat is a rural locality in the local government areas (LGA) of Launceston and George Town in the Launceston LGA region of Tasmania. The locality is about 40 kilometres (25 mi) east of the town of George Town. The 2016 census recorded a population of 18 for the state suburb of Retreat.

== History ==
Retreat was gazetted as a locality in 1964. The name was in use by 1915 but there is no record of its origin.

== Geography ==
The boundaries consist primarily of survey lines.

== Road infrastructure ==
Route C819 (Hextalls Road / Yondover Road / Retreat Road) passes through from south-east to north.
