= Leioproctus spatulatus =

Scientific classification
- Kingdom: Animalia
- Phylum: Arthropoda
- Clade: Pancrustacea
- Class: Insecta
- Order: Hymenoptera
- Family: Colletidae
- Genus: Leioproctus
- Species: L. spatulatus

Binomial name
- Leioproctus spatulatus (Cockerell, 1905)

Synonyms
- Paracolletes spatulatus Cockerell, 1905; Paracolletes providellus bacchalis Cockerell, 1914; Paracolletes subviridis Cockerell, 1915; Paracolletes pallidicinctus Rayment, 1953

Species of bee

Leioproctus spatulatus, or Leioproctus (Leioproctus) spatulatus, is a species of bee in the family Colletidae and subfamily Colletinae. It is endemic to Australia. It was described by British-American entomologist Theodore Dru Alison Cockerell in 1905.

== Distribution and habitat ==
The species occurs in south-eastern Australia. Type localities include Bacchus Marsh, Victoria, and Bridport, Tasmania.

== Behaviour ==
The adults are flying mellivores. Flowering plants visited by the bees include Bursaria spinosa as well as Eucalyptus, Melaleuca and Leptospermum species.

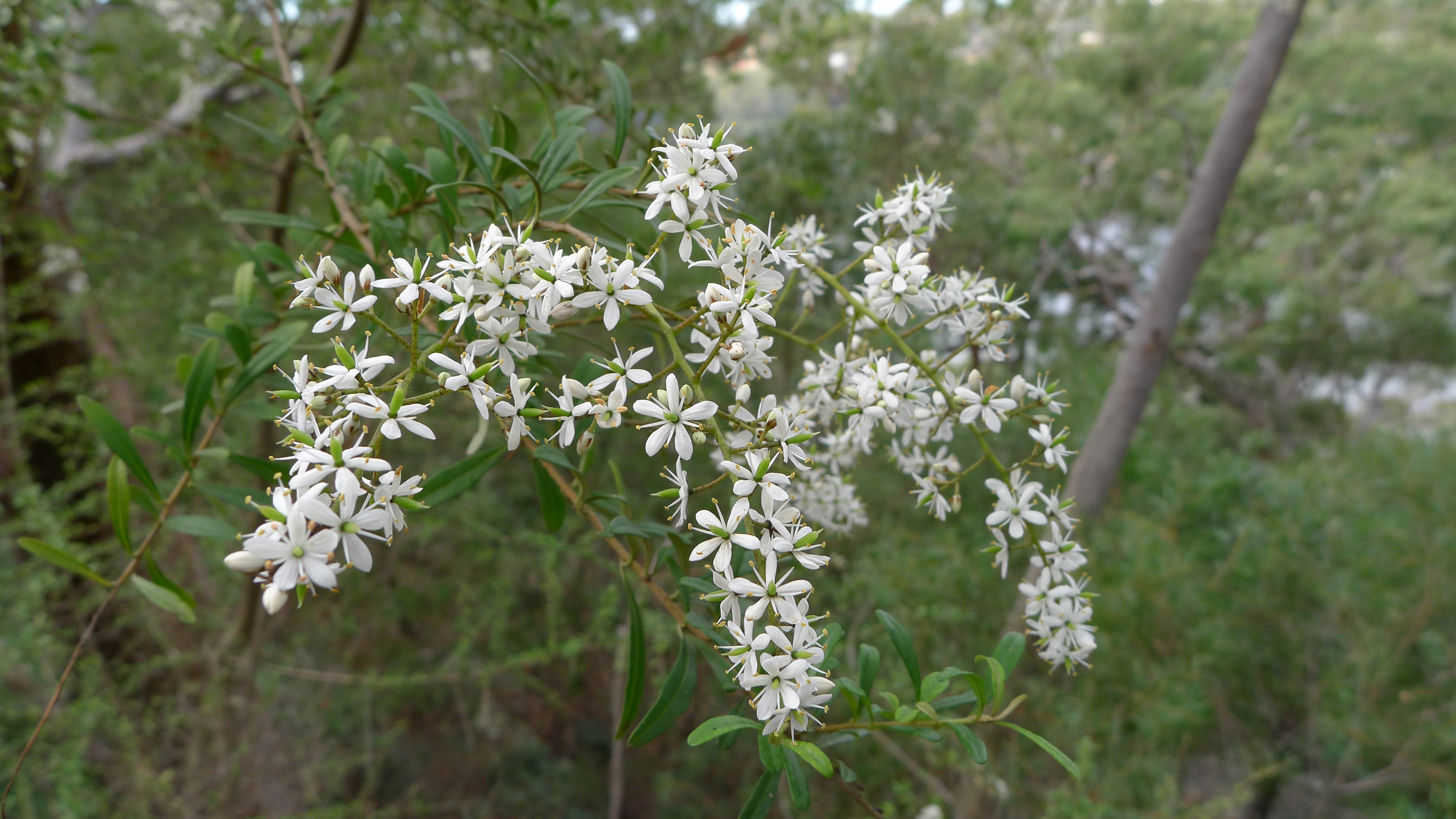
Bursaria spinosa (blackthorn), a forage plant of the bees
