= Pipers River, Tasmania =

Pipers River
- Town
- Coordinates: 41°06′S 147°05′E
- Country: Australia
- State: Tasmania
- Region: Launceston
- LGA: George Town, Launceston
- Location: 23 km (14 mi) E of George Town

Government
  - State electorate: Bass
  - Federal division: Bass

Population
  - Total: 426 (2016 census)
- Postcode: 7252
Localities around Pipers River
Stony Head	Weymouth	Pipers Brook
Lefroy, Mount Direction	Pipers River	Pipers Brook, Retreat
Mount Direction	Lower Turners Marsh, Mount Direction	Bangor

Pipers River is a small township on the river of the same name in the north of Tasmania.

There is a tennis court, a general store/takeaway, a fire station, a church, and a cemetery. Pipers River Road serves as a thoroughfare connecting Launceston to the Bridport Highway. The road is sealed and well-developed; however, there are many sharp corners, particularly around Karoola.

== History ==
Pipers River was named after Ensign H Piper, a member of the expedition to the district in 1804 led by Colonel William Paterson. Piper's River Post Office opened on 6 April 1865. It was renamed Piper's River Upper in 1870 and Piper's River in 1887.

== Geography ==
Pipers River (the watercourse) flows through from south to north.

== Locality ==
Pipers River is the name of the rural residential locality, mostly part of the George Town Council which encompasses the town. It was gazetted as a locality in 1964. The 2016 census recorded a population of 426 for the state suburb of Pipers River.

== Road infrastructure ==
Route B83 (Pipers River Road) runs from the south to the town in the centre, where it intersects with Route B82 (Bridport Road) which passes through from west to east.
