= Long Reach, Tasmania =

Long Reach
- Town
- Coordinates: 41°09′50″S 146°56′05″E
- Country: Australia
- State: Tasmania
- Region: Launceston
- LGA: George Town
- Location: 15 km (9.3 mi) SE of George Town

Government
  - State electorate: Bass
  - Federal division: Bass

Population
  - Total: nil (2016 census)
- Postcode: 7253
Localities around Long Reach
Bell Bay	George Town	Mount Direction
Tamar River	Long Reach	Mount Direction
Hillwood	Hillwood	Mount Direction

Long Reach is a rural locality in the local government area (LGA) of George Town in the Launceston LGA region of Tasmania. The locality is about 15 kilometres (9.3 mi) south-east of the town of George Town. The 2016 census recorded a population of nil for the state suburb of Long Reach.

== History ==
Long Reach is a confirmed locality.

== Geography ==
The waters of the Tamar River Estuary form the south-western boundary.

== Road infrastructure ==
Route A8 (East Tamar Highway) passes through from south to north.
