= Bellingham, Tasmania =

Bellingham
- Town
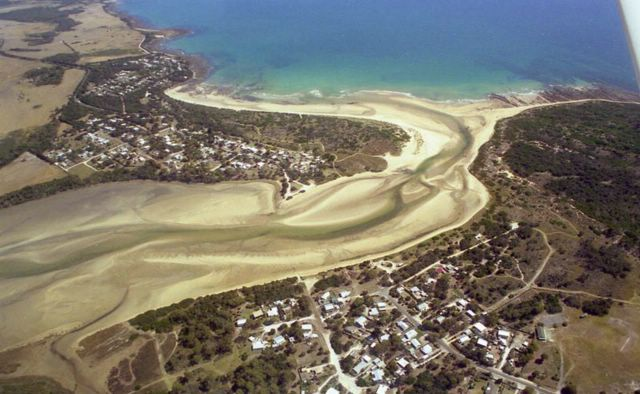
- Aerial photo of Bellingham (right) and Weymouth (left)

- Coordinates: 41°01′S 147°10′E
- Country: Australia
- State: Tasmania
- Region: Launceston
- LGA: George Town
- Location: 259 km (161 mi) N of Hobart; 62 km (39 mi) N of Launceston; 38 km (24 mi) NE of George Town

Government
  - State electorate: Bass
  - Federal division: Bass

Population
  - Total: 60 (2016 census)
- Postcode: 7254
Localities around Bellingham
| Bass Strait | Bass Strait | Bridport |
| Weymouth | Bellingham | Bridport |
| Pipers Brook | Pipers Brook | Pipers Brook |

Bellingham is a tiny coastal hamlet in northern Tasmania, situated on the mouth of the Pipers River directly opposite the town of Weymouth. The town is located 62 kilometres (39 mi) from Launceston, 20 kilometres (12 mi) from Bridport and 38 kilometres (24 mi) from George Town.

== Description and history ==
Miller's Beach

The township is largely made up of shacks used during the summer time. The permanent residence is about 25 people. In recent years the George Town Council has completed upgrade projects on many of the township's roads, including sealing works on the main Bellingham Road as well as base graveling on Gees Marsh Road, allowing better access to the central township and surrounding areas.

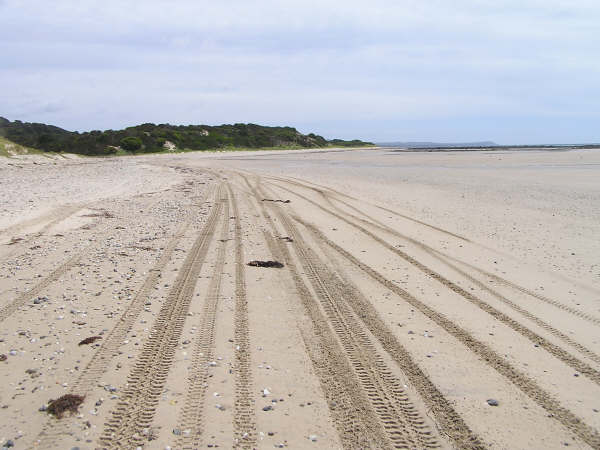
4wd tracks on Noland Bay Beach

There is a camping ground, tennis court and small boat ramp within the central township, The Marine and Safety Board of Tasmania recently announcing funding for a much-needed upgrade for the ramp. the nearby shoreline of the Pipers River can easily be accessed from the town, as well as large coastal beaches adjacent to Bass Strait.

Miller's Beach can be accessed by Four-wheel drive from Gees Marsh Road and marks the beginning of a designated 4wd route that traverses the beaches and sand dunes of Noland Bay and St. Albans Bay, before arriving at Bridport.

Originally called Pipers Heads, Bellingham was first used as a watch for sailing vessels that went up the Pipers River to Weymouth. The wharf at Weymouth was burnt down at the turn of the century, leaving a number of burnt pylons in the river sand that remain to this day. Bellingham was gazetted as a locality in 1964.

== Locality ==
Bellingham is also the name of the rural locality part of the George Town Council which encompasses the hamlet. The 2016 census recorded a population of 60 for the state suburb of Bellingham. The waters of Bass Strait form most of the northern boundary, and Pipers Brook the western. Little Pipers River forms part of the eastern boundary.

== Road infrastructure ==
Route C852 (Bellingham Road) enters from the south and runs through to the village in the north-west, where it ends.

== Controversies ==
Recently, the Tasmanian Government altered Crown Land arrangements in the nearby Gees Marsh hamlet, just east of the main township, so that certain shack owners were allowed to buy the previously public-held land on which their shacks were located. Unfortunately, some shacks were declared unsafe and were forcibly demolished, creating anger amongst local shack owners, many of whom had used these shacks for generations. Shacks such as "Ghost Shack", a landmark that was brought to its present location in 1939 on a sledge at lower Gees Marsh road, as well as "Butterworths Shack", which was originally built in the 1920s before being extended and later abandoned, falling to vandalism and disrepair in recent years, were amongst those that were removed.

Decisions made by the George Town Council to demolish local community halls and other public facilities in the township, due to disrepair and unsustainable insurance costs, have also created controversy. Local and transient-summer residents have actively campaigned against the decisions and have requested that the Council maintain funding and upgrade the facilities to an acceptable level. Suggestions include the construction of new toilet facilities and disabled access ramps.

== Fordington ==
Further East from the main township, alongside the Little Pipers River, there was a town surveyed as Fordington that was, up until 20 years ago, a boom area. As the town's population decreased, the State Lands Department created controversy in ordering many off their land in the area, designating most of it either as uninhabitable crown land or privately owned property. On Christmas Day in 2001, a large tidal surge swept up the Little Pipers, the evidence of which can still be observed in large-scale vegetation and riverbank damage in the low-lying areas adjacent to the coast. Although no warning to the deserted river area now, there were at least two witnesses to the surge who were either present at the time of the surge or passed by the area on that day whilst headed along the beach.
