= Diaphone =

Noisemaking device used in foghorns

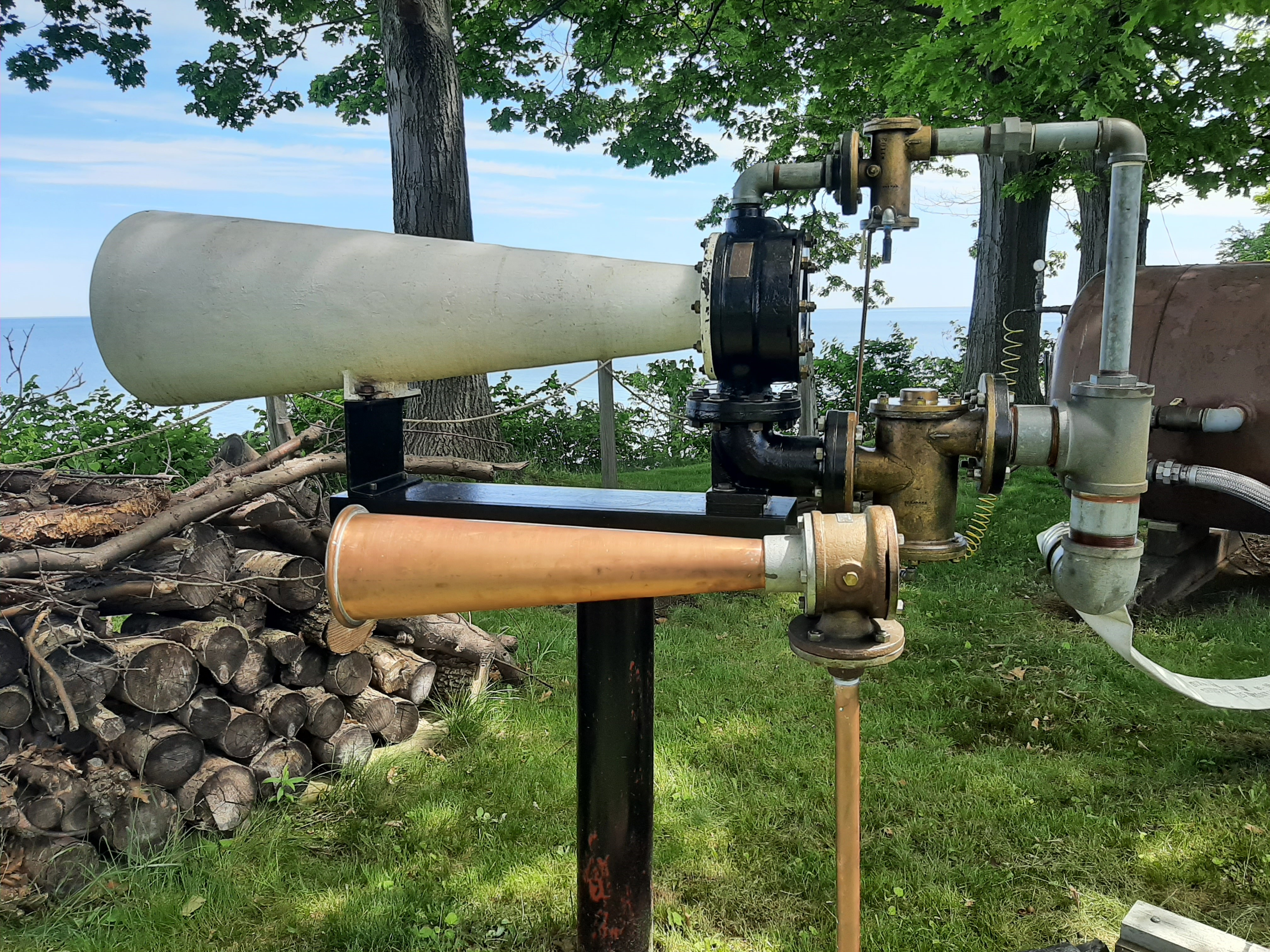
A Type B Diaphone (Gamewell) in front of a Type F Diaphone fog horn (Diaphone Signal Co.) previously used in Cleveland, OH.

The diaphone is a noisemaking device best known for its use as a foghorn: It can produce deep, powerful tones, able to carry a long distance. Although they have fallen out of favor, diaphones were also used at some fire stations and in other situations where a loud, audible signal was required.

Sound of the diaphone at East Brother Island Light, a lighthouse located at Richmond, California.

== History ==
The diaphone horn was based directly on the organ stop of the same name invented by Robert Hope-Jones, creator of the theatre organ. Hope-Jones' design was based on a piston that was closed only at its bottom end and had slots, perpendicular to its axis, cut through its sides; the slotted piston moved within a similarly slotted cylinder. Outside of the cylinder was a reservoir of high-pressure air. Initially, high-pressure air would be admitted behind the piston, pushing it forward. When the slots of the piston aligned with those of the cylinder, air passed into the piston, making a sound and pushing the piston back to its starting position, whence the cycle would repeat. A modification of Hope-Jones' design was patented by John Pell Northey, head of the Northey Co. Ltd. of Toronto, Ontario, Canada, which manufactured pumps and small gasoline engines. Northey added a secondary compressed air supply to the piston in order to power it during both its forward and reverse strokes and thus create an even more powerful sound. The entire horn apparatus was driven by a compressor.

To manufacture the new equipment, Northey set up the Diaphone Signal Co. at Toronto in 1903. It manufactured a range of diaphone models: the large "Type F", which created a tone of about 250 Hz, found worldwide use as a fog signal, especially in lighthouses. The mechanism of the diaphone created a noticeable low-frequency "grunt" at the end of each note produced, caused by the piston decelerating as the air supply was cut. As this low-frequency sound could carry farther, Northey's son Rodney redesigned the "Type F" model to sustain the second low tone, creating the familiar two-tone fog signal, commonly used in lighthouses and lightvessels in the United States and Canada (as well as in a famous series of radio commercials for Lifebuoy soap). This version, known as the "Improved Type F" or later as the "F2T", was particularly common in installations on the West Coast of the United States and in lightvessels. Installations in Europe generally used single-tone diaphones.

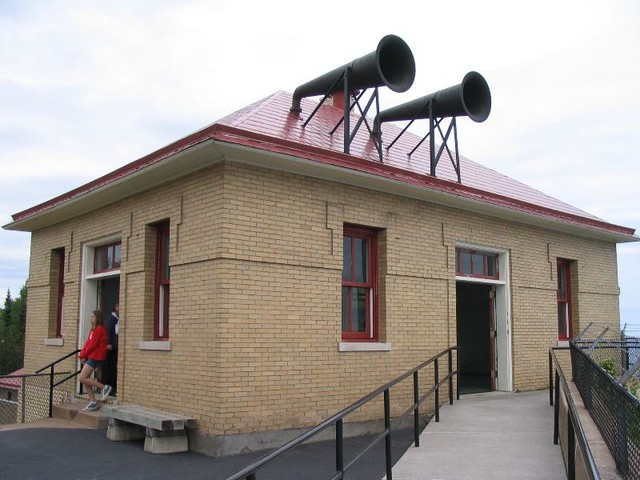
Building housing the two diaphones of Split Rock Lighthouse.

Rodney Northey sold the Diaphone Signal Co. in 1932, when it was bought by a Buffalo, New York company, Deck Brothers, working under contract for the United States Lighthouse Service. This company still exists, although it no longer manufactures diaphones. The European manufacturing rights were obtained by Chance Brothers of Birmingham in the United Kingdom, already a major supplier of Fresnel lenses and other equipment to lighthouse authorities.

In use, the diaphone was generally found to be reliable and suffered little from wear, as the lightweight piston floated on a cushion of air during oscillation. Such wear as did occur tended to happen as a result of the piston becoming loose: as the pistons were custom-made and the design to some degree affected the individual sound characteristics of the signal, the manufacturers supplied two spare pistons with each diaphone.

The majority of diaphone installations were removed or became disused during the 1960s and 1970s. This was partly a result of automation of lighthouses, but it was also found that modern diaphragm horns would produce similar levels of volume to a diaphone while requiring much smaller and less powerful compressors. By 1983, the last two-tone "F2T" type in full-time operation in the United States was at Edgartown, Martha's Vineyard. A few survive in working condition in lighthouses around the world.

== The Gamewell diaphone ==
This considerably smaller device was produced by the Gamewell Corporation, of Newton, Massachusetts, for use as a municipal alarm, especially at fire stations, to alert firefighters and the public during emergencies. Many Gamewell diaphone systems remain in use today. The Gamewell diaphone has a range of about six miles (9.7 km) under optimum conditions.

A noon test of a Gamewell Diaphone

== Working diaphone installations ==
The following installations are still functional and are demonstrated from time to time as tourist attractions.

- Detour Reef Lighthouse near Detour, Michigan restored their original Type F2T diaphones to working condition and reinstalled them in the lighthouse, complete with new compressors and air tanks.
- East Brother Island Light, Richmond, California has a fully restored fog signal building with operational 2-tone Type F2T diaphones.
- Grand Traverse Light, Michigan has a working Type CC diaphone.
- Nantucket Light Ship museum in Boston, Massachusetts sounded its restored diaphone for the first time on August 7, 2015.
- Nash Point Lighthouse, South Wales, United Kingdom
- Portland Bill Lighthouse, Isle of Portland, United Kingdom: A Type F diaphone decommissioned in 1996, but restored in 2003 for the benefit of visitors.
- Low Head Lighthouse in Low Head, Tasmania possesses the only working Type G diaphone (one of the largest models constructed) in the world. It has an audible range of up to 20 miles.
- Lindesnes Lighthouse in southern Norway. The last Sunday of July, Fog Horn Day is held at the lighthouse.
