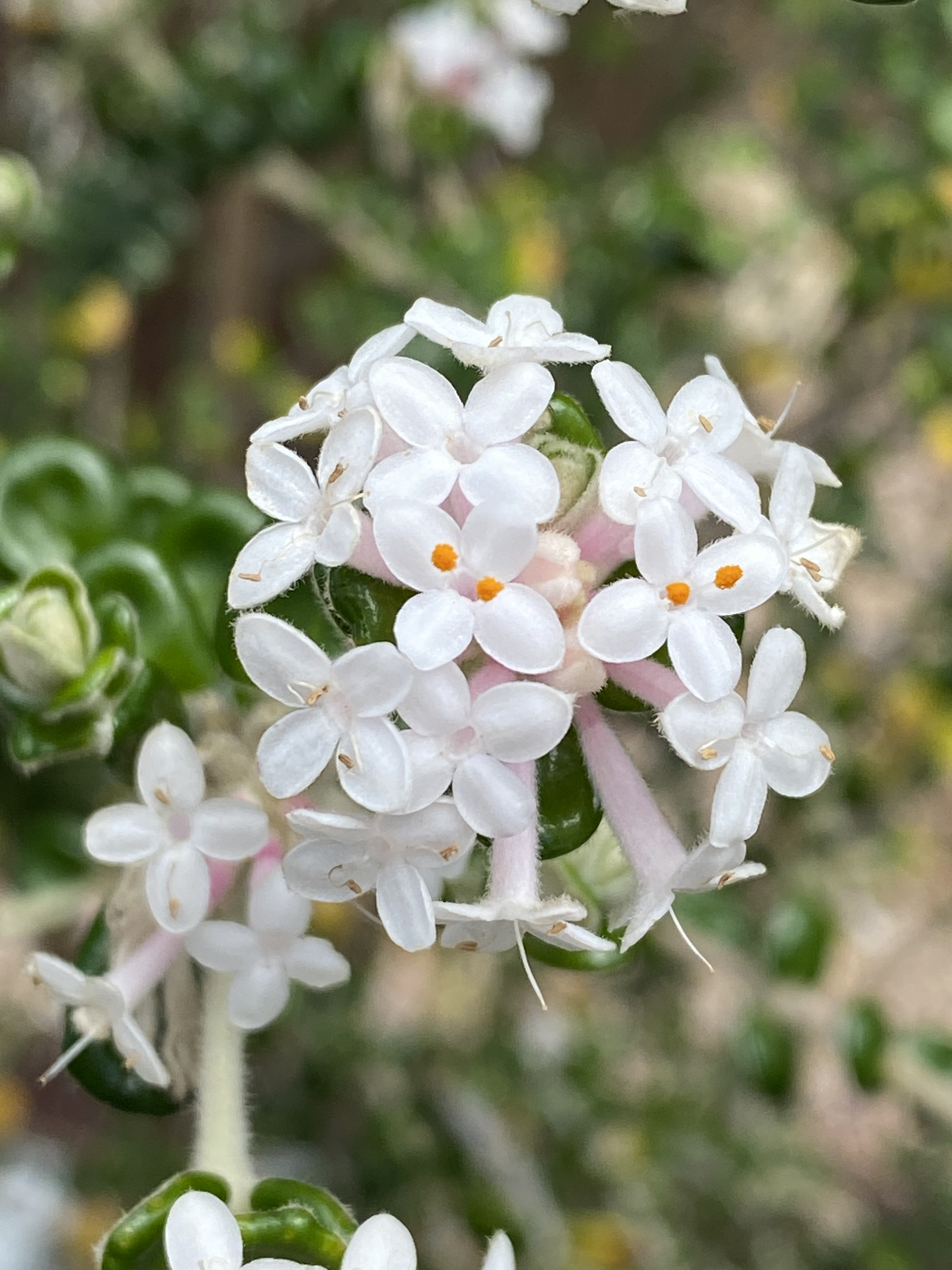
- In the Australian National Botanic Gardens

Scientific classification
- Kingdom: Plantae
- Clade: Tracheophytes
- Clade: Angiosperms
- Clade: Eudicots
- Clade: Rosids
- Order: Malvales
- Family: Thymelaeaceae
- Genus: Pimelea
- Species: P. nivea

Binomial name
- Pimelea nivea Labill.

= Pimelea nivea =

Species of shrub

Pimelea nivea is a species of flowering plant in the family Thymelaeaceae and is endemic to Tasmania. It is an erect shrub with densely hairy young stems, elliptic to round leaves arranged in opposite pairs, and compact clusters of white or cream-coloured flowers.

== Description ==
Pimelea nivea is an erect shrub that typically grows to a height of 0.3–3.5 m (1 ft 0 in – 11 ft 6 in), its young stems densely covered with white hairs. The leaves are arranged in opposite pairs, elliptic to round, 2–16 mm (0.079–0.630 in) long and 2.5–12 mm (0.098–0.472 in) wide on a short petiole. The upper surface of the leaves is glabrous and the lower surface is densely covered with white hairs. The flowers are arranged in large numbers on the ends of the branches in compact clusters. The flowers are usually white or cream-coloured, rarely pale pink, the sepals 2.0–4.5 mm (0.079–0.177 in) long, the floral tube 6–10 mm (0.24–0.39 in) long. Flowering occurs from September to February.

== Taxonomy ==
Pimelea nivea was first formally described in 1805 by Jacques Labillardière in his book Novae Hollandiae Plantarum Specimen. The specific epithet (nivea) means "snowy" or "snow-white".

== Distribution and habitat ==
This pimelea mainly grows on rocky hillslopes and is found in the Devonport-Waterhouse and between Hobart and South West Cape, where it is common and widespread.
