= Lefroy, Tasmania =

Lefroy
- Town
- Coordinates: 41°06′00″S 146°59′32″E
- Country: Australia
- State: Tasmania
- Region: Launceston
- LGA: George Town
- Location: 46 km (29 mi) N of Launceston

Government
  - State electorate: Bass
  - Federal division: Bass

Population
  - Totals: 76 (2016 census); 82
- Postcode: 7252
Localities around Lefroy
George Town	Stony Head	Stony Head
George Town	Lefroy	Pipers River
Mount Direction	Pipers River	Pipers River

Lefroy is a rural locality in the local government area of George Town in the Launceston region of Tasmania. It is located about 46 kilometres (29 mi) north of the town of Launceston. The 2016 census determined a population of 76 for the state suburb of Lefroy. The 2021 census determined a population of 82 for the state suburb of Lefroy.

== History ==
Originally known as Nine Mile Springs, the locality was named for Sir John Henry Lefroy, the Administrator of Tasmania in 1880. Lefroy was gazetted as a locality in 1967.

In August 1892, reports showed that Lefroy was full of ownerless stray goats, leading to calls for a town pound.

== Geography ==
The Curries River forms the western boundary.

== Road infrastructure ==
The B82 route (Bridport Road) follows part of the southern boundary. Route C807 (Big Hill Road / Shaw Street / Hope Street / Beechford Road) starts from an intersection with B82 and runs north through the locality and village before exiting in the north-west. Route C808 (Lefroy Road) starts from an intersection with B82 and runs north-west to the village, where it intersects with C807.
