= Lulworth, Tasmania =

Lulworth Tasmania
- Coordinates: 41°00′08″S 147°05′09″E
- Population: 165 (2016 census)
- Postcode(s): 7252
- Location: 58 km (36 mi) N of Launceston
- LGA(s): George Town
- Region: Launceston
- State electorate(s): Bass
- Federal division(s): Bass
Localities around Lulworth:
Bass Strait	Bass Strait	Bass Strait
Stony Head	Lulworth	Weymouth
Stony Head	Stony Head, Weymouth	Weymouth

Lulworth is a rural residential locality in the local government area of George Town in the Launceston region of Tasmania. It is located about 58 kilometres (36 mi) north of the town of Launceston. The 2016 census determined a population of 165 for the state suburb of Lulworth.

== History ==
Lulworth was gazetted as a locality in 1964.

== Geography ==
Bass Strait forms the northern boundary.

== Road infrastructure ==
The C817 route (Tam O’Shanter Road) enters from the south-east and runs through to the village in the north-west, where it ends.
