= Tomahawk, Tasmania =

Tomahawk
- Town
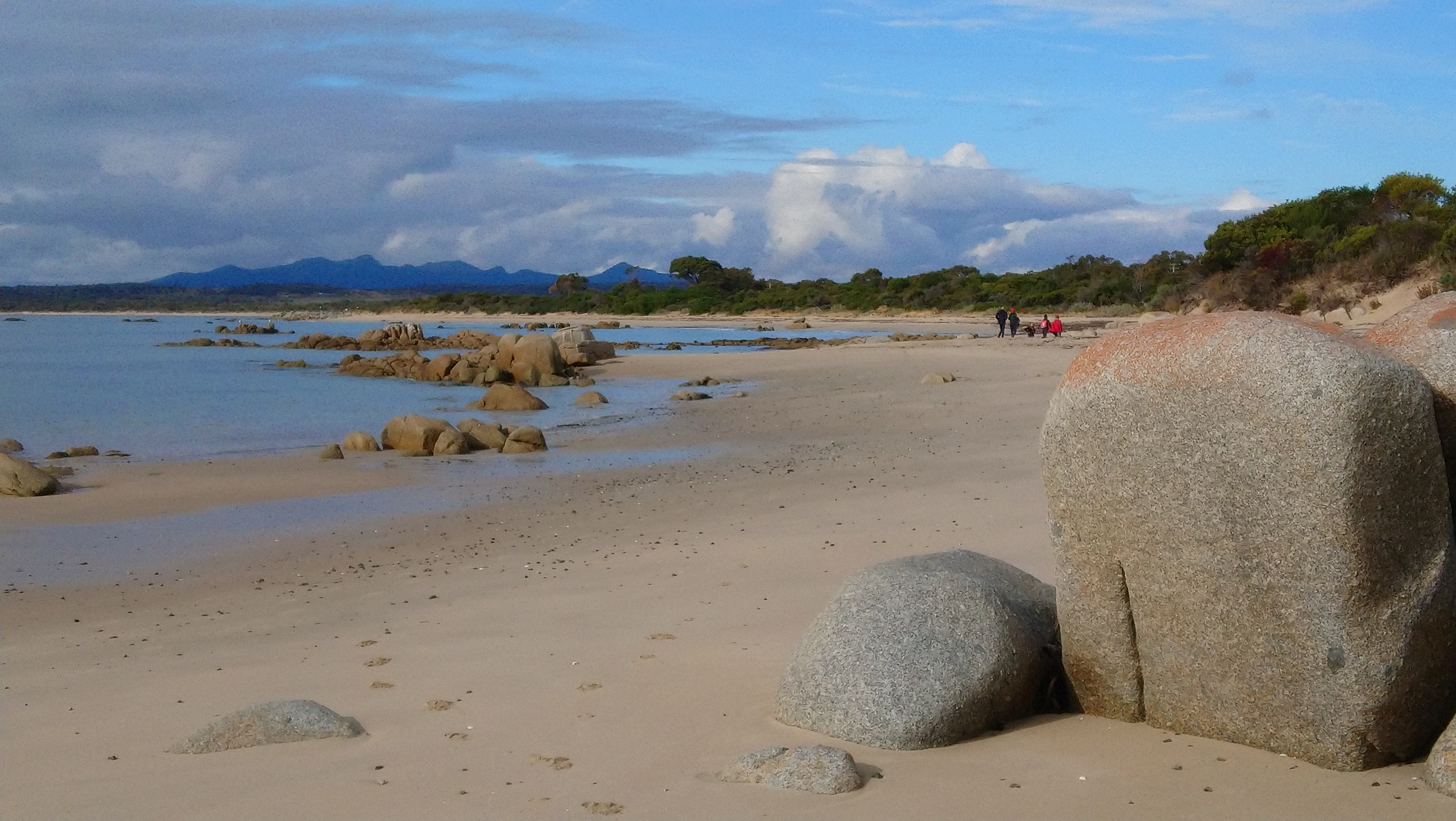
- Beach at Tomahawk, looking south-east to Mount Cameron

- Coordinates: 40°52′S 147°46′E
- Country: Australia
- State: Tasmania
- Region: North-east
- LGA: Dorset Council
- Location: 308 km (191 mi) N of Hobart; 111 km (69 mi) NE of Launceston; 44 km (27 mi) NE of Bridport; 65 km (40 mi) NE of Scottsdale

Government
  - State electorate: Bass
  - Federal division: Bass

Population
  - Total: 48 (2016 census)
- Postcode: 7262
Localities around Tomahawk
Waterhouse	Bass Strait	Boobyalla
Waterhouse	Tomahawk	Boobyalla
Waterhouse	Waterhouse, Banca	Boobyalla

Tomahawk is a rural locality in the local government area (LGA) of Dorset in the North-east LGA region of Tasmania. The locality is about 65 kilometres (40 mi) north-east of the town of Scottsdale. The 2016 census recorded a population of 48 for the state suburb of Tomahawk.

The town has a caravan park with a small shop. There is a boat ramp and the area is known for its fishing.

== History ==
Tomahawk was gazetted as a locality in 1965. Previous names were “Portland” (from 1845) and “Du Cane” (after Governor Charles Du Cane, until 1934).

== Geography ==
The waters of Ringarooma Bay, an inlet of Bass Strait, form most of the northern boundary. The Tomahawk River forms the south-western boundary before flowing through to the north.

== Road infrastructure ==
Route B82 (Waterhouse Road) passes through from west to east. Route C836 (Tomahawk Road) starts at an intersection with B82 and runs north-west to the village, where it ends. Route C840 (Banca Road) starts at an intersection with B82 and runs south until it exits.
