= Port Dalrymple School =

Location
- George Town; Tasmania; Australia; 41.0993°S 146.8281°E

Information
- Type: Public
- Established: 1999
- Principal: Jeanna Bolton
- Staff: 50
- Years offered: K–12 + VET
- Enrollment: 550
- Colours: Navy, white, maroon
- Website: portdalrymple.education.tas.edu.au

Port Dalrymple School is a school in George Town, Tasmania, Australia. The school has students from Kindergarten to Grade 12 and Vocational Education Training (VET).

== History ==
Port Dalrymple School was opened in 1999 after the merge of George Town Primary School and George Town High School. In 1999 the school continued with the kindergarten to grade six and grade seven to ten groups, in 2000 this changed to Junior School (kindergarten to grade four), Middle School (grades five to eight) and Senior School (grade nine and ten). In 2005 this changed again when grade eight became the start of senior school. In 2017, Port Dalrymple School was extended to include grades 11 and 12.

== Learning ==
Port Dalrymple School has a very different type of learning than most other district high schools.

=== Grades ===
- Kindergarten (2 Classes)
- Junior School – Prep to Grade 4 (8 Classes)
- Middle School – Grade 5 to 7 (5 Classes)
- Senior School – Grade 8 to 10 (7 Classes)
- Vocational Educational Training

=== Personal Learning Pathways ===
Middle and Senior school students take part in Personal Learning Pathways (PLP's). Students pick their subject (1 for middle school and 3 for senior school) and spend 4 periods (3 hours) a week on each subject, this continues all year for senior school students, middle school students change their PLP halfway through the year.

=== Principal Teacher Classes ===
For all other lessons (excluding Languages Other Than English in senior school) students spend their time in a class assigned at the beginning of each year, they also have a Principal Teacher who teaches Literacy, Numeracy, Maintaining Wellbeing (Excluding Physical Education) and Inquiry. Physical Education (PE) is with a PE teacher and done in your Principal Teacher Class. You can also choose Extended PE for a PLP which will allow you to participate in 3 more hours of Physical Education a week. Music is also a compulsory subject in middle school, students will have weekly music lessons which their class.

=== LOTE ===
Middle School students participate in compulsory LOTE (Languages Other Than English) with their principal teacher classes. Middle School generally learn basic Indonesian, but in recent years they have learnt basic Thai and Japanese. Senior School students have the option of learning a language online with a teacher from another school, the three options are French, Japanese, Spanish and Indonesian (however at present nobody is learning Indonesian.)

== School population ==
Port Dalrymple School has around 550 students and 50 people on staff. This number has remained steady for a few years.
