= Weymouth, Tasmania =

Weymouth
- Town
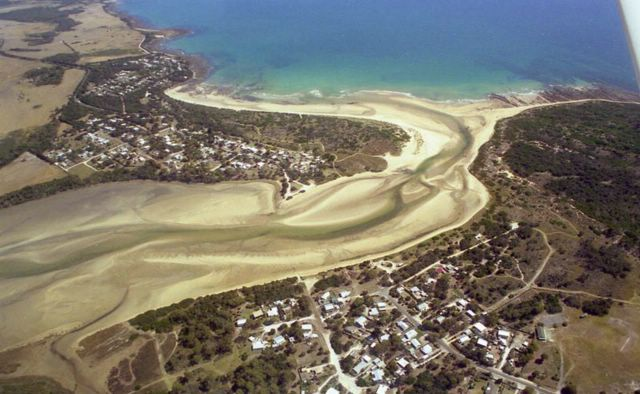
- Aerial shot of Weymouth (left) and Bellingham (right)

- Coordinates: 41°01′S 147°09′E
- Country: Australia
- State: Tasmania
- Region: Launceston
- LGA: George Town
- Location: 256 km (159 mi) N of Hobart; 60 km (37 mi) N of Launceston; 37 km (23 mi) NE of George Town

Government
  - State electorate: Bass
  - Federal division: Bass

Population
  - Total: 129 (2016 census)
- Postcode: 7252
Localities around Weymouth
Lulworth	Bass Strait	Bass Strait
Stony Head	Weymouth	Bellingham
Pipers River	Pipers River	Pipers Brook

Weymouth is a rural locality in the local government area (LGA) of George Town in the Launceston LGA region of Tasmania. The locality is about 37 kilometres (23 mi) north-east of the town of George Town. The 2016 census recorded a population of 129 for the state suburb of Weymouth. It is a small township in northern Tasmania, on the Pipers River opposite Bellingham and about 60 km from Launceston. It has a very small permanent population; however, it attracts many visitors during the summer months. Weymouth has a beach, a tennis court, and a community hall with a playground.

The beaches of Weymouth are known for lapidary specimens of agate and chalcedony, and a section of the beach is a designated fossicking area, according to Mineral Resources Tasmania.

== History ==
Weymouth was gazetted as a locality in 1960. Back Creek Post Office opened on 1 June 1870 and was replaced by the Weymouth office in 1959. This closed in 1977.

== Geography ==
The waters of Bass Strait form most of the northern boundary, and Pipers River the eastern.

== Road infrastructure ==
Route C816 (Weymouth Road) enters from the south and runs through to the village in the north-east, where it ends. Route C817 (Tam O’Shanter Road) starts from an intersection with C816 and runs north until it exits.
