= Star of the Sea College, George Town =

Star of the Sea College

Location
- George Town, Tasmania; 7253; Australia; 41°06′29.5″S 146°49′45.5″E

Information
- Motto: Faith and Knowledge
- Denomination: Roman Catholic, Presentation Sisters
- Opened: 1957
- Principal: Richard Chapman
- Grades: K–10
- Colors: Maroon, light blue, white
- Website: starsea.tas.edu.au

Star of the Sea College is a Catholic School in George Town, Tasmania founded by the Presentation Sisters in 1957.

== See also ==
- Star of the Sea College
