= Georgetown Cricket Club =

- Home ground: Crothers Oval
- Colours: Red, White & Black
- Head coach: Michael Doherty
- 2007–08: A Grade: 6th; 2nd Grade: 6th; 3rd Grade: NTCA Premiers

George Town Cricket Club (GTCC) is a cricket team which represents the town of George Town.

The GTCC was previously represented by three teams known as the "Tamar Saints" in the NTCA competition but withdrew from the competition in 2015 due to low playing numbers, a lack of sponsorship and community support and internal organisational issues. The GTCC had won some lower grade competitions, most recently winning the 2006/07 3rd Grade Priemiership, and following it up by going back to back in 2007/08.

George Town's home ground Crothers Oval is named after former games record holder and life member, Peter Crothers. The oval is the best seeing ground in the competition outside of the NTCA ground, with elevated views available from both sides of the field. Crothers Oval is also home to one of the most consistent centre wickets in the NTCA despite the club relying on volunteers to complete the pitch preparation rather than a full-time curator.

== Honours ==
- NTCA Premierships: 2006/07 3rd Grade
