= Noland Bay =

Australian bay

Coordinates: 41°00′S 147°09′E

Noland Bay is a bay in Northern Tasmania, Australia located in Bass Strait. The bay is situated on the mouth of the Pipers River. There are two towns located on the bay: Weymouth and Bellingham.
