= George Town Council =

- Local government area
- Coordinates: 41.1018°S 147.0251°E
- Country: Australia
- State: Tasmania
- Region: East Tamar Valley
- Established: 1 January 1907
- Council seat: George Town

Government
  - Mayor: Greg Kieser
  - State electorate(s): Bass
  - Federal division(s): Bass

Area
  - Total: 653 km^{2} (252 sq mi)

Population
  - Total(s): 6,931 (2018)
  - Density: 10.614/km^{2} (27.490/sq mi)
- Website: George Town Council
LGAs around George Town Council
Bass Strait	Bass Strait	Bass Strait
West Tamar	George Town Council	Dorset
West Tamar	Launceston	Launceston

George Town Council is a local government body in northern Tasmania, situated north of Launceston. The George Town local government area is classified as rural and has a population of 6,931, it encompasses the principal town, George Town, and the nearby localities including Hillwood, Low Head and Pipers River.

== History and attributes ==
The George Town municipality was established on 1 January 1907. George Town is classified as rural, agricultural and large (RAL) under the Australian Classification of Local Governments.

Name	Position	Party
Greg Kieser	Mayor	Independent
Greg Dawson	Deputy Mayor	Independent
Winston Archer	Councillor	Independent
Heather Ashley	Councillor	Independent
Heather Barwick	Councillor	Independent
Tim Harris	Councillor	Independent
Simone Lowe	Councillor	Independent
Winston Mason	Councillor	Independent
Jason Orr	Councillor	Independent

== Suburbs ==
Suburb	Census population 2016	Reason
George Town	4347	Includes Pipe Clay Bay
Pipe Clay Bay		Incl. in George Town
Low Head	572	
Bell Bay	0	
Long Reach	0	
Hillwood	578	
Mount Direction	246	
Lower Turners Marsh	37	
Pipers River	426	
Pipers Brook	93	
Bellingham	60	
Retreat	18	
Weymouth	129	
Lulworth	165	
Beechford	90	
Stony Head	0	
Lefroy	76	
Back Creek		
Total	6,837	
	(73)	Variance
Local government total	6,764	Gazetted George Town local government area

== See also ==
- List of local government areas of Tasmania
