= Pipers River =

River in Tasmania, Australia

Pipers (wattra karoola)
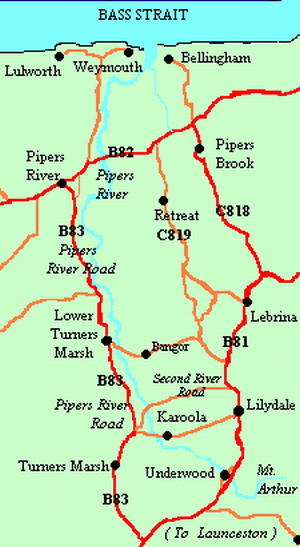
- Pipers River area

- Location of the Pipers River mouth in Tasmania

Location
- Country: Australia
- State: Tasmania
- Region: Northern Tasmania

Physical characteristics
- Source: Mount Arthur
  - location: south of Lilydale
  - coordinates: 41°18′20″S 147°16′54″E
  - elevation: 975 m (3,199 ft)
- Mouth: Noland Bay, Bass Strait
  - location: Pipers Heads
  - coordinates: 41°00′32″S 147°09′26″E
  - elevation: 0 m (0 ft)
- Length: 59 km (37 mi)

Basin features
- Tributaries
  - right: Second River (Tasmania)

The Pipers River is a perennial river in the northern region of Tasmania, Australia. It was named for Captain Hugh Piper. The Aboriginal name for the river is Wattra karoola.

== Course and features ==
The river rises below Mount Arthur near Lilydale. It runs through Hollybank Forest, a tourist attraction, before flowing through the outer reaches of Lilydale. It then proceeds through to Karoola, Lower Turners Marsh and then Pipers River town. The river has its mouth at Pipers Heads near the towns of Weymouth and Bellingham flowing into Noland Bay, Bass Strait. A number of tributaries flow into the Pipers River including; Pipers Brook, at Bellingham, Back Creek at Weymouth and Rocky Creek near Lilydale. The river descends 975 metres (3,199 ft) over its 59-kilometre (37 mi) course. The river is not very tidal except in the immediate area around Weymouth.

== Wildlife ==
Results from a genetic study indicated that specimens of Tasmanian giant freshwater crayfish from a site in the Pipers River catchment (Little Creek) were significantly genetically distinct from the rest of the species, and should be considered an important location for conservation.

== See also ==
- List of rivers of Australia § Tasmania
