= Mount Direction, Tasmania =

Mount Direction Tasmania
- Coordinates: 41°14′09″S 147°01′18″E
- Population: 246 (2016 census)
- Postcode(s): 7252
- Location: 27 km (17 mi) NW of Launceston
- LGA(s): Launceston, George Town
- Region: Launceston, North-east
- State electorate(s): Bass
- Federal division(s): Bass
Localities around Mount Direction:
| Long Reach | Pipers River | Pipers River |
| Hillwood | Mount Direction | Karoola |
| Tamar River | Swan Bay | Turners Marsh |

Mount Direction is a locality and small rural community in the local government areas of Launceston and George Town, in the Launceston and North-east regions of Tasmania. It is located about 27 kilometres (17 mi) north-west of the town of Launceston. The Tamar River forms a small section of the south-western boundary. The 2016 census determined a population of 246 for the state suburb of Mount Direction.

== Road infrastructure ==
The C809 route (Dalrymple Road) intersects with the East Tamar Highway in the south-west of the locality, passing through from south to north and providing access to many other localities.
