= Hillwood, Tasmania =

Hillwood Tasmania
- Coordinates: 41°14′37″S 146°58′43″E
- Population: 591 (2021 census)
- Postcode(s): 7252
- Location: 25.5 km (16 mi) from Launceston
- LGA(s): George Town
- State electorate(s): Bass
- Federal division(s): Bass
Localities around Hillwood:
Tamar River	Long Reach, Tamar River	Long Reach
Tamar River	Hillwood	Mount Direction
Tamar River	Mount Direction	Mount Direction

Hillwood is a small town approximately 25.5 kilometres (15.8 mi) north of Launceston. Hillwood is known for its Hillwood Berry Farm, Millers Orchard, Egg Island and various amenities including a sports oval which is used by the Hillwood Sharks Football Club in the NTFA. The 2021 census determined a population of 591 for the state suburb of Hillwood.

== History ==
Hillwood was gazetted as a locality in 1967.

== Geography ==
The Tamar River forms the western and northern boundaries.

== Road infrastructure ==
The East Tamar Highway (A8) enters from the south-east and runs through to the north-east where it exits. The Batman Highway (B73) starts from an intersection with A8 and runs west to the Batman Bridge, where it exits. Route C727 (Hillwood Jetty Road / Craigburn Road) starts from an intersection with A8 on the eastern boundary and runs west to the riverfront before turning north and following the shoreline, eventually ending at an intersection with B73. Route C810 (East Arm Road) starts at an intersection with A8 and runs east before it exits.
