= Noland (surname) =

Noland is a surname. Notable people with the surname (all American) include:

- Air Noland (born 2005), American football player
- Cady Noland (born 1956), American sculptor
- Charles Noland, American actor
- Helen Beatty Noland (c. 1907–1962), American politician
- James Ellsworth Noland, (1920–1992), American politician from Indiana
- John Noland (1844–1908), American Confederate soldier
- Kenneth Noland (1924–2010), American abstract painter
- Mark Noland (born 1959), American politician
- Michael Noland (born 1960), American politician from Illinois
- Valora Noland (1941–2022), American actress
- William Churchill Noland (1865–1951), American architect
