= Low Head Lighthouse =

Lighthouse in Tasmania, Australia

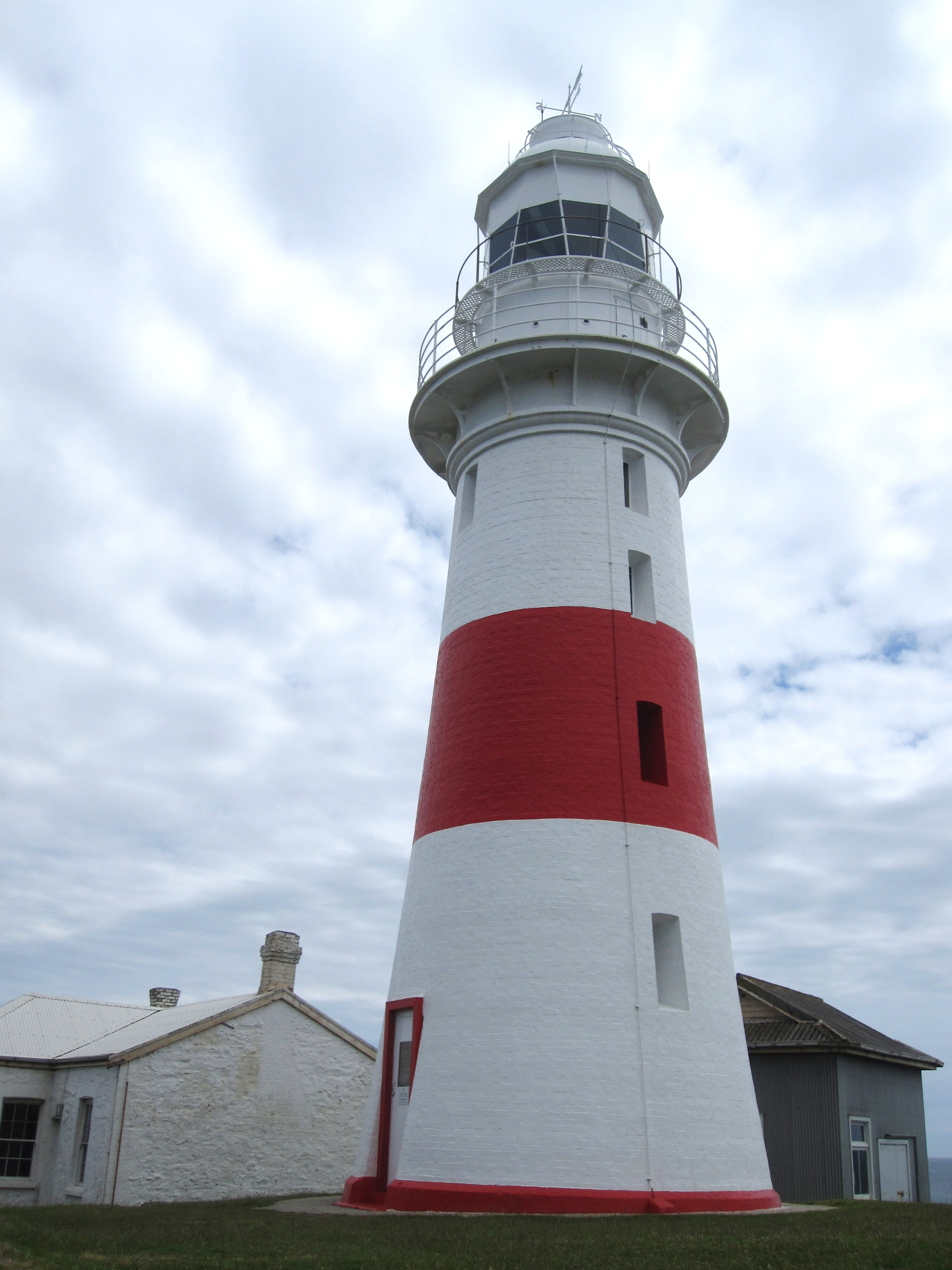
- View of Low Head Lighthouse, looking to the northwest in 2010. Generator sheds are visible behind the tower
- Location: Low Head (on Bass Strait), George Town, Tasmania, Australia
- Coordinates: 41°03′1.5″S 146°47′22.0″E

Tower
- Constructed: 1833
- Foundation: concrete base
- Construction: brick tower
- Automated: 1995
- Height: 19 metres (62 ft)
- Shape: cylindrical tower with balcony and lantern
- Markings: white tower with red horizontal bands at base and midsection White metal lantern and gallery
- Operator: Australian Maritime Safety Authority
- Heritage: listed on the Tasmanian Heritage Register
- Fog signal: Type G diaphone, installed in 1929

Light
- First lit: 1833
- Focal height: 43 metres (141 ft)
- Lens: Fresnel lens, Wilkins and Company, London
- Intensity: 50,000 cd (1000 watt, 240 volt tungsten-halogen lamp)
- Range: 43 kilometers (23 nmi)
- Characteristic: Fl(3) W 30s.

Low Head Lighthouse is in Low Head, Tasmania, about 7 kilometres (4.3 mi) north of George Town on the east side of the mouth of the Tamar River. It was the third lighthouse to be constructed in Australia, and it is also Australia's oldest continuously used pilot station. This light is now unmanned and automated.

== History ==
During the course of their circumnavigation of Van Diemen's Land now Tasmania in the Norfolk in 1798, George Bass and Matthew Flinders made landfall at a place they named Port Dalrymple now George Town, 40 kilometers (25 mi) to the north-west of Launceston. In doing so, they proved the existence of a strait between Australia and Tasmania. Flinders reported difficulty in locating the entrance to the channel.

Colonel William Paterson arrived on 16 February 1804 aboard HMS Buffalo as the newly appointed Lieutenant Governor of Van Diemen's Land with the first settlers. The first navigation marker he installed at Low Head was a simple flagpole in 1804. Later that year, Paterson established a pilot station and signal station in the sheltered bay below Low Head. He also installed a fire beacon at Low Head to mark the hazardous entrance of the Tamar River. When a vessel was sighted after sunset, a fire would be lit and attended all night by convicts to allow the vessel to maintain sight of the port.

Several serious shipping accidents occurred near the mouth of the Tamar River early in the history of George Town. The first and most infamous of these occurred on 15 June 1808, when Hebe struck a reef between Low Head and Western Head at the entrance to Port Dalrymple. The ship was wrecked on the rocks at the mouth to the Tamar River, which have since that day carried the name Hebe Reef. Responding to this ongoing threat to shipping, the local Committee of Pilotage recommended in 1826 that a lightstation should be built at Low Head.

Australia's first lighthouse, Macquarie Lighthouse in Vaucluse, New South Wales was lit in 1793. Australia's second lighthouse, Iron Pot Lighthouse at the entrance to the River Derwent was lit in 1832. Low Head Lighthouse, constructed by convict labour and first lit on 27 December 1833, became Tasmania's second and only the third one to be built in Australia.

The presence of Low Head Lighthouse has undoubtedly prevented numerous shipping accidents since its first operation in 1833, but by no means all of them. Since the loss of the Hebe in 1808, nine more vessels have been lost on Hebe Reef. The most recent was Iron Baron, chartered by BHP Shipping. On 10 July 1995, near the end of a voyage from Groote Eylandt with a load of manganese ore, Iron Baron ran aground on Hebe Reef. All crew were safely evacuated but the accident resulted in the worst oil spill in Australian history.

=== Tower ===
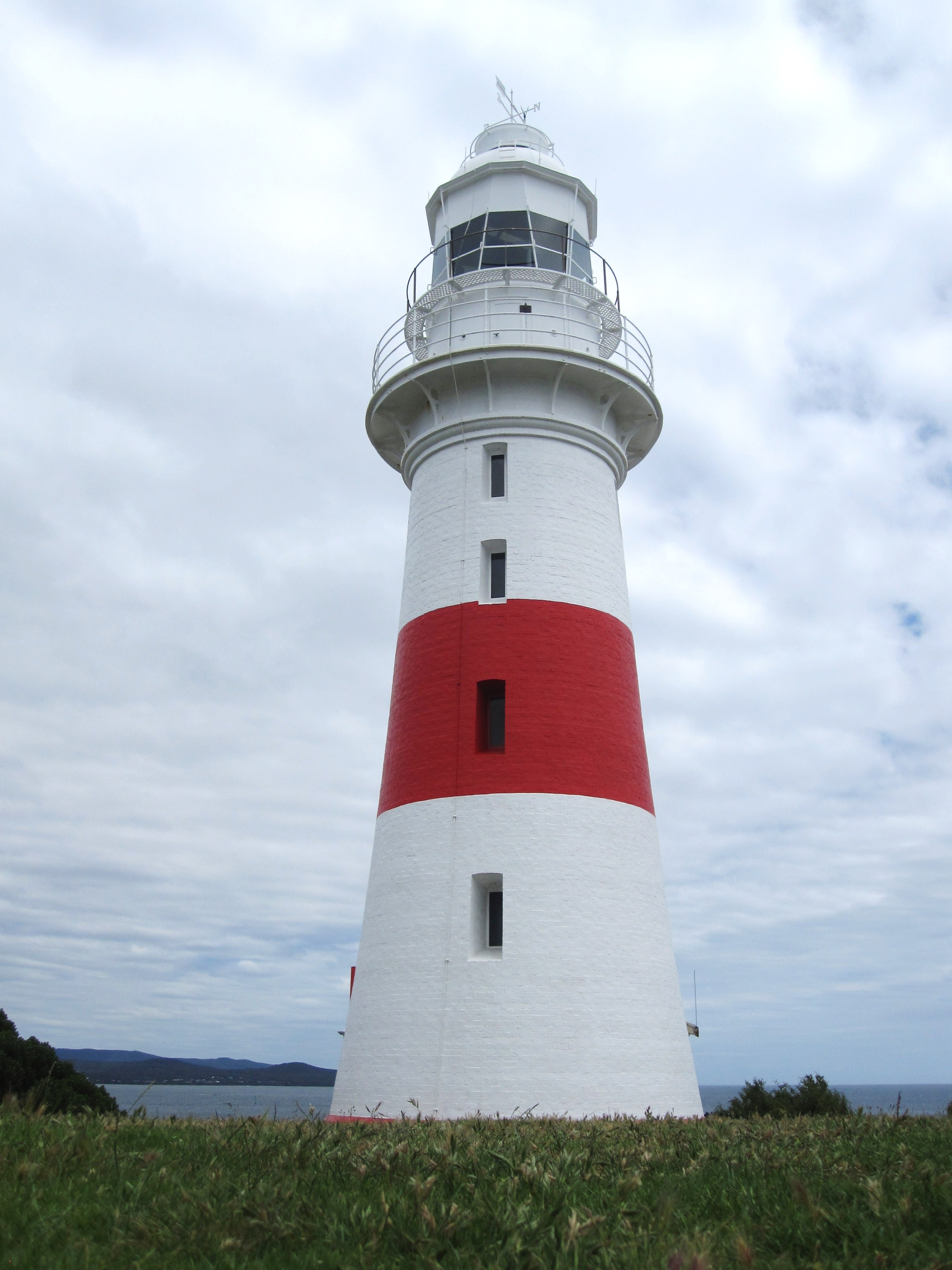
View of Low Head Lighthouse, looking to the west in 2010

The original tower, 15.25 metres (50.0 ft) high, was known as the "Georgetown Station". Designed by Colonial Architect John Lee Archer, who was responsible for the design of many other Tasmanian lights, it was constructed of local rubble with a coat of stucco to make the structure durable. The crown was built of freestone from Launceston, and the lantern room was built of timber, also from Launceston.

By the 1880s, the original stone tower had fallen into a state of disrepair. It was demolished in 1888 and replaced with the present double brick structure with a new lantern room and apparatus, designed by Marine Board architect Robert Huckson. The new tower was painted solid white from top to bottom. On 5 January 1926, a broad bright red band was painted around the midsection of the tower to improve visibility during daylight hours.

=== Quarters ===
Low Head Lighthouse was staffed by a superintendent and two convict assistants who were locked in their quarters overnight. The lighthouse keeper's quarters consisted of four rooms attached to the base of the tower. Low Head Lighthouse was the only Tasmanian lighthouse to be built with attached quarters.

A new Head Keeper's quarters was built in 1890. This was followed in 1916 by the construction of an Assistant Keeper's quarters immediately to the southwest of the tower.

=== Light and lens assembly ===
The original apparatus was supplied in 1833 by W. Hart of Launceston. He supplied six dozen Argand lamps with tin reflectors at three shillings and sixpence each. In 1835, the apparatus was upgraded by installation of a revolving shutter which was rotated by a weight-driven clockwork mechanism. In 1838, the original whale oil Argand lamps and the tin mirrors were replaced by a revolving catadioptric system, manufactured by Wilkins and Company of London. The lens floated and rotated in a mercury bath, which served as a bearing. The cost of these upgrades was £2000. In 1851, the luminous intensity of the lantern was further increased.

When the new tower was constructed in 1888, the revolving catadioptric apparatus was retained, and a cast iron and copper housing for the lantern (manufactured by Chance Brothers of Smethwick) was added.

In 1898, an auxiliary light was added to the tower. The assembly, manufactured by Chance Brothers, consisted of a two-wick lamp with a red lens that produced a red warning light to illuminate the hazardous Hebe Reef. The assembly is positioned such that the light shines from a window just above the midsection of the tower, about 6 metres (20 ft) below the main light.

In 1916, the lighting and lens assembly was extensively upgraded. A new revolving Fresnel lens (3rd order 375 millimeter f.r. triple flashing catadioptric) was installed. The whale oil lantern was also replaced with a 55 millimetre incandescent gas mantle lantern, and fuelled by vaporized kerosene. The lens and lantern were both manufactured by Chance Brothers; the total cost of these improvements was £1,348 13s ld.

On 12 April 1937, Hydroelectric power (generated at the nearby Duck Reach Power Station) was finally supplied to Low Head Lighthouse. The clockwork rotating mechanism was replaced by an electric motor, and the kerosene lantern was replaced by a 110 volt 500 watt electric lamp. The lantern apparatus currently uses a 240 volt lamp.

=== Foghorn ===
Tasmania's only foghorn (also manufactured by Chance Brothers) is a Type G diaphone that was installed in April 1929 at Low Head Lighthouse. The foghorn was operated by the lighthouse keepers during foggy conditions for more than forty years. The original device consisted of two Gardner kerosene engines driving 2 Reavell air compressors, supplying air to two compressed air receivers (each with a capacity of 7.5 cubic metres (260 cu ft) to an operating pressure of 35 pounds per square inch (240 kPa). An air-operated timing mechanism controlled the valves which produced the sound, which could be heard at distances of up to 32 kilometers (20 mi) from Low Head. The foghorn was electrified in 1940, along with the rest of the equipment at the lightstation. At that time, one of the kerosene engines was removed and replaced with a 20-horsepower electric motor.

One of the largest diaphones ever constructed, the foghorn was decommissioned in 1973 because of technological advances in marine navigational equipment. The device fell into disrepair over the next few decades. Early in 2000, the Low Head Progress & Heritage Association in conjunction with the Tasmania Parks and Wildlife Service (the present owners of the equipment) began a project to restore the foghorn. The device became operational again in April 2001. Today, the foghorn at Low Head Lighthouse is one of only two functioning Type G diaphones in the world, and it is sounded every Sunday at noon.

=== Communication ===
Beginning in 1804, Flag signals (semaphore flags) were employed to communicate shipping news from vessels in the Bass Strait to Low Head Lighthouse. From there, semaphore lines would relay information to George Town and nearby Mount George, and thence to Mount Direction and Launceston. The semaphore system was finally replaced in 1859 by an electric telegraph system, when Tasmania was linked across Bass Strait to mainland Australia by a submarine communications cable which came ashore at East Beach in Low Head. The first undersea telephone cable linking Tasmania to mainland Australia was laid between Low Head and Flinders, Victoria in 1936.

=== Lighthouse keepers ===
From 1865 to 1912, Low Head Lighthouse was under the control of Alfred C. Rockwell and his son Alfred C. Rockwell Junior. The lightstation was also responsible for the smaller Tamar River leading lights, which were separately staffed for some years.

== Nearby lighthouses ==
- Tamar River Leading Lights (41°04.8′S 146°48.3′E)
- Mersey River Leading Lights (41°10.7′S 146°21.7′E)
- Mersey Bluff Lighthouse (41°10′S 146°21′E)
- Round Hill Point (41°03.9′S 145°57.7′E)
- Highfield Bluff (40°44.4′S 145°17.3′E)
- Rocky Cape Lighthouse (40°51.3′S 145°30.4′E)
- Table Cape Lighthouse (40°56.9′S 145°43.8′E)

== See also ==
- History of Tasmania
- List of lighthouses in Tasmania
