= Low Head =

- Town
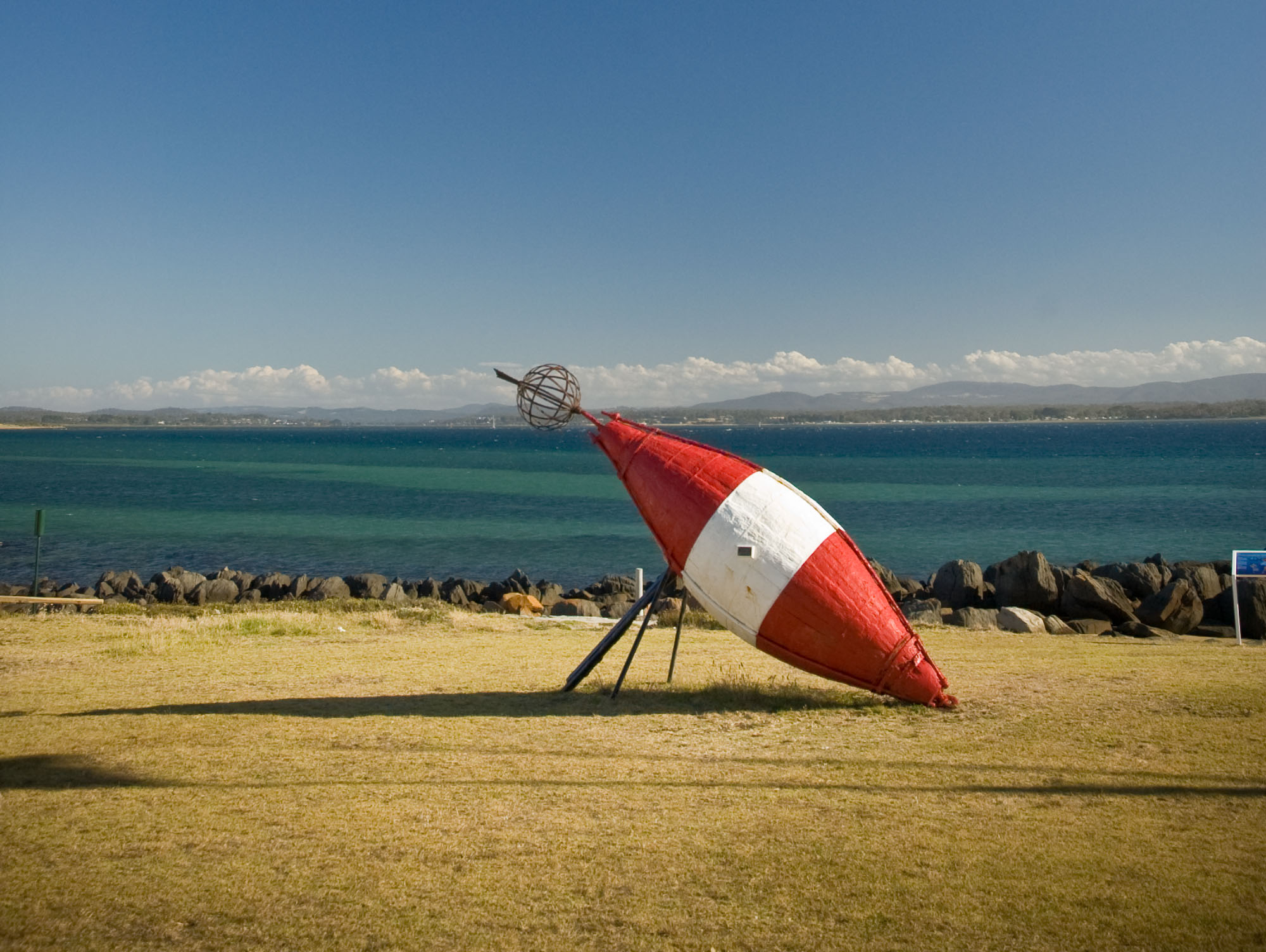
- Low Head Pilot Station

- Coordinates: 41°4′0″S 146°48′0″E
- Country: Australia
- State: Tasmania
- Region: Launceston
- LGA: George Town Council
- Location: 252 km (157 mi) N of Hobart; 55 km (34 mi) N of Launceston; 5 km (3.1 mi) N of George Town

Government
  - State electorate: Bass
  - Federal division: Bass
- Elevation: 28 m (92 ft)

Population
  - Total: 572 (2016 census)
- Postcode: 7253
Localities around Low Head
Bass Strait	Bass Strait	Bass Strait
Tamar River	Low Head	George Town
Tamar River	George Town	George Town

Low Head is a rural residential locality in the local government area (LGA) of George Town in the Launceston LGA region of Tasmania. The locality is about 5 kilometres (3.1 mi) north of the town of George Town. The 2016 census recorded a population of 572 for the state suburb of Low Head. It is a suburb of George Town, on a peninsula at the mouth of the Tamar River.

It is a popular snorkel and scuba diving area during much of the year, with extensive wide, unspoiled beaches.

The area also has a lighthouse, beaches and a colony of little penguins (Eudyptula minor).

The foghorn, a Chance Brothers "Type G" diaphone at Low Head Lighthouse, is the only operable foghorn of its type and is popular with tourists as it is sounded at noon every Sunday.

== History ==
Low Head was gazetted as a locality in 1967. The first Low Head Post Office opened on 12 September 1887 and closed in 1894. In 1996 the Iron Baron ran aground on Hebe Reef, off Low Head, causing the worst oil disaster in Australia's history.

== Geography ==
The waters of the Tamar River estuary (also known as Port Dalrymple) and Bass Strait form the western to north-eastern boundaries. The George Town Aerodrome is within the locality.

== Climate ==
Low Head has a temperate oceanic climate (Köppen: Cfb), bordering on a warm Mediterranean climate.

Climate data for Low Head
Month	Jan	Feb	Mar	Apr	May	Jun	Jul	Aug	Sep	Oct	Nov	Dec	Year
Record high °C (°F)	28.6 (83.5)	28.7 (83.7)	26.1 (79.0)	23.1 (73.6)	20.4 (68.7)	18.0 (64.4)	16.1 (61.0)	17.2 (63.0)	20.6 (69.1)	21.2 (70.2)	24.8 (76.6)	25.7 (78.3)	28.7 (83.7)
Mean daily maximum °C (°F)	20.7 (69.3)	21.2 (70.2)	20.1 (68.2)	17.8 (64.0)	15.4 (59.7)	13.5 (56.3)	12.8 (55.0)	13.1 (55.6)	14.1 (57.4)	15.5 (59.9)	17.5 (63.5)	19.1 (66.4)	16.7 (62.1)
Mean daily minimum °C (°F)	14.5 (58.1)	14.6 (58.3)	13.4 (56.1)	11.2 (52.2)	9.4 (48.9)	7.5 (45.5)	7.0 (44.6)	7.4 (45.3)	8.5 (47.3)	9.6 (49.3)	11.4 (52.5)	12.9 (55.2)	10.6 (51.1)
Record low °C (°F)	8.2 (46.8)	8.1 (46.6)	7.0 (44.6)	3.7 (38.7)	2.6 (36.7)	0.8 (33.4)	0.6 (33.1)	0.5 (32.9)	1.4 (34.5)	3.9 (39.0)	5.1 (41.2)	6.5 (43.7)	0.5 (32.9)
Average rainfall mm (inches)	46.6 (1.83)	27.0 (1.06)	50.6 (1.99)	55.9 (2.20)	61.4 (2.42)	75.2 (2.96)	74.2 (2.92)	76.6 (3.02)	57.3 (2.26)	54.0 (2.13)	52.9 (2.08)	43.8 (1.72)	674.0 (26.54)
Average rainy days (≥ 0.2 mm)	6.9	6.6	7.8	9.6	12.7	14.1	15.9	15.7	14.3	11.8	9.6	8.9	133.9
Average afternoon relative humidity (%)	68	66	64	66	69	72	71	71	71	68	68	66	68
Source: Bureau of Meteorology (1997–2024 averages; extremes 1980–present)

== Road infrastructure ==
Route A8 (Low Head Road) runs through from south-west to north-west, where it terminates.

== See also ==
- Wesele Cove
