= Bridport, Tasmania =

Bridport
- Town
- Coordinates: 41°00′S 147°24′E
- Country: Australia
- State: Tasmania
- LGA: Dorset Council
- Location: 22 km (14 mi) from Scottsdale; 56 km (35 mi) from George Town; 60 km (37 mi) from Gladstone; 63 km (39 mi) from Launceston

Government
  - State electorate: Bass
  - Federal division: Bass
- Elevation: 52 m (171 ft)

Population
  - Total: 1,715 (2011 census)
- Postcode: 7262
- Mean max temp: 17.6 °C (63.7 °F)
- Mean min temp: 9.0 °C (48.2 °F)
- Annual rainfall: 757.0 mm (29.80 in)
Localities around Bridport
		Tomahawk
Bellingham	Bridport	Waterhouse
Golconda	Scottsdale

Bridport is a small town on the north-east coast of Tasmania, Australia. It is part of the Dorset Council and takes its name from Bridport in Dorset, England. At the 2016 census, Bridport had a population of 1,715.

== History ==
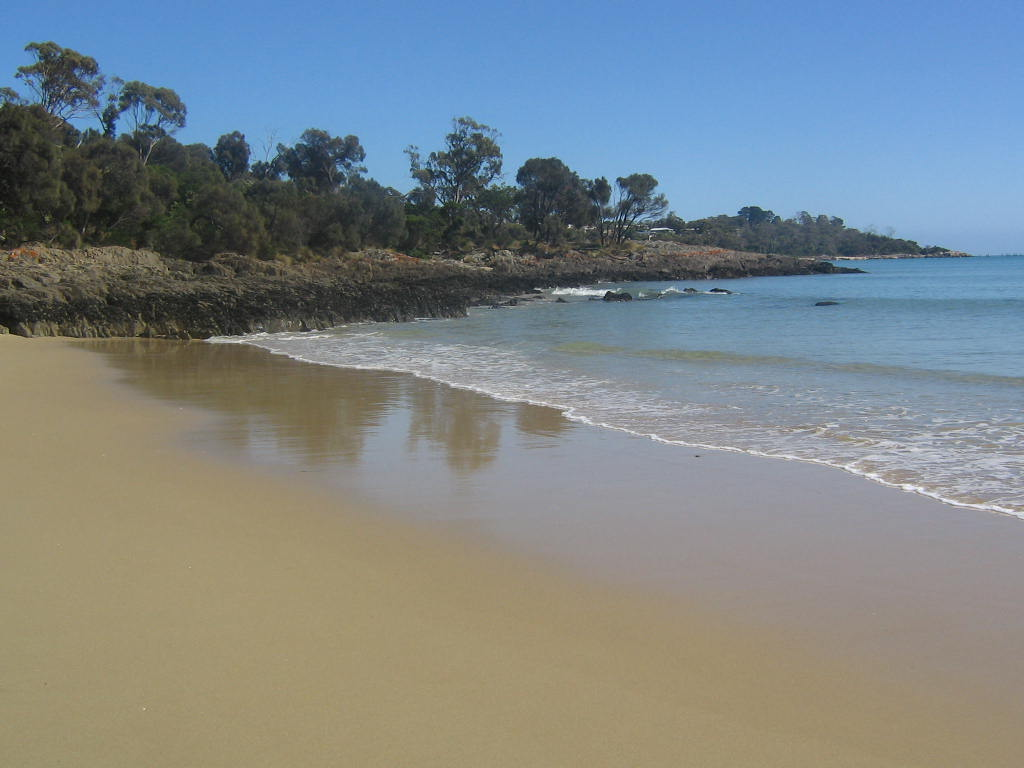
Beach at Bridport

Bridport Post Office opened on 1 May 1882.

In 2004 a links golf course, Barnbougle Dunes, was established on sand dunes 3 km north-east of Bridport. This was soon ranked in the top 50 courses in the world.

A second links course called Lost Farm was built next to Barnbougle Dunes and opened in December 2010. Built to a similar standard, this development established club facilities high on sand dunes for views of the beach and Anderson Bay.

== Geography ==
Located on Anderson Bay, Bridport is a holiday location with the population increasing markedly in summer. In summer it is estimated that Bridport has a Summer population of 5,000. It has beaches, swimming, sailing and other water sports. Streets in the northern half of Bridport have male person names and those in the southern half have female names. Nearby towns include Scottsdale, Tomahawk and Bellingham.

== Facilities ==
Town facilities include supermarkets, hotel, chemist, baker, butcher, clothing store, golf courses, lawn bowls, sailing club, doctor's surgery, visitor's information centre, caravan park and several levels of accommodation from backpackers, bed and breakfast, to holiday resort. Commercial fishing operates from Bridport as well as sporting fishing from the rocks or small boats.

== Transport ==
A helicopter service began in 2008 transporting people between Launceston and Bridport mainly for golfers who fly into Tasmania to play. A ferry operates from Bridport to Lady Barron on Flinders Island, part of the Furneaux Group. A light aircraft service operates from Bridport Aerodrome to Flinders Island.

== Climate ==
Climate data for Bridport (1994–2018)
Month	Jan	Feb	Mar	Apr	May	Jun	Jul	Aug	Sep	Oct	Nov	Dec	Year
Record high °C (°F)	32.0 (89.6)	31.4 (88.5)	29.0 (84.2)	25.8 (78.4)	21.4 (70.5)	19.0 (66.2)	17.7 (63.9)	18.3 (64.9)	21.5 (70.7)	28.0 (82.4)	27.3 (81.1)	31.7 (89.1)	32.0 (89.6)
Mean daily maximum °C (°F)	22.0 (71.6)	22.2 (72.0)	21.0 (69.8)	18.3 (64.9)	15.9 (60.6)	14.1 (57.4)	13.4 (56.1)	13.7 (56.7)	14.9 (58.8)	16.5 (61.7)	18.5 (65.3)	20.2 (68.4)	17.6 (63.7)
Mean daily minimum °C (°F)	13.0 (55.4)	13.1 (55.6)	11.8 (53.2)	9.6 (49.3)	7.9 (46.2)	6.3 (43.3)	5.4 (41.7)	5.6 (42.1)	6.7 (44.1)	7.9 (46.2)	9.9 (49.8)	11.2 (52.2)	9.0 (48.2)
Record low °C (°F)	4.3 (39.7)	4.7 (40.5)	1.0 (33.8)	0.7 (33.3)	0.5 (32.9)	−0.5 (31.1)	−2.1 (28.2)	−1.5 (29.3)	−0.2 (31.6)	0.5 (32.9)	1.0 (33.8)	3.4 (38.1)	−2.1 (28.2)
Average precipitation mm (inches)	54.6 (2.15)	31.4 (1.24)	51.4 (2.02)	60.2 (2.37)	69.7 (2.74)	86.7 (3.41)	81.3 (3.20)	89.6 (3.53)	71.7 (2.82)	57.1 (2.25)	52.1 (2.05)	46.6 (1.83)	757.0 (29.80)
Average precipitation days	7.8	6.7	8.9	11.0	14.4	15.3	17.7	17.0	16.1	12.5	10.5	8.8	146.7
Average afternoon relative humidity (%)	61	61	58	64	69	72	71	70	67	64	63	59	65
Source: Bureau of Meteorology
