= George Town, Tasmania =

George Town kinimathatakinta (Northern Tasmanian)
- Town
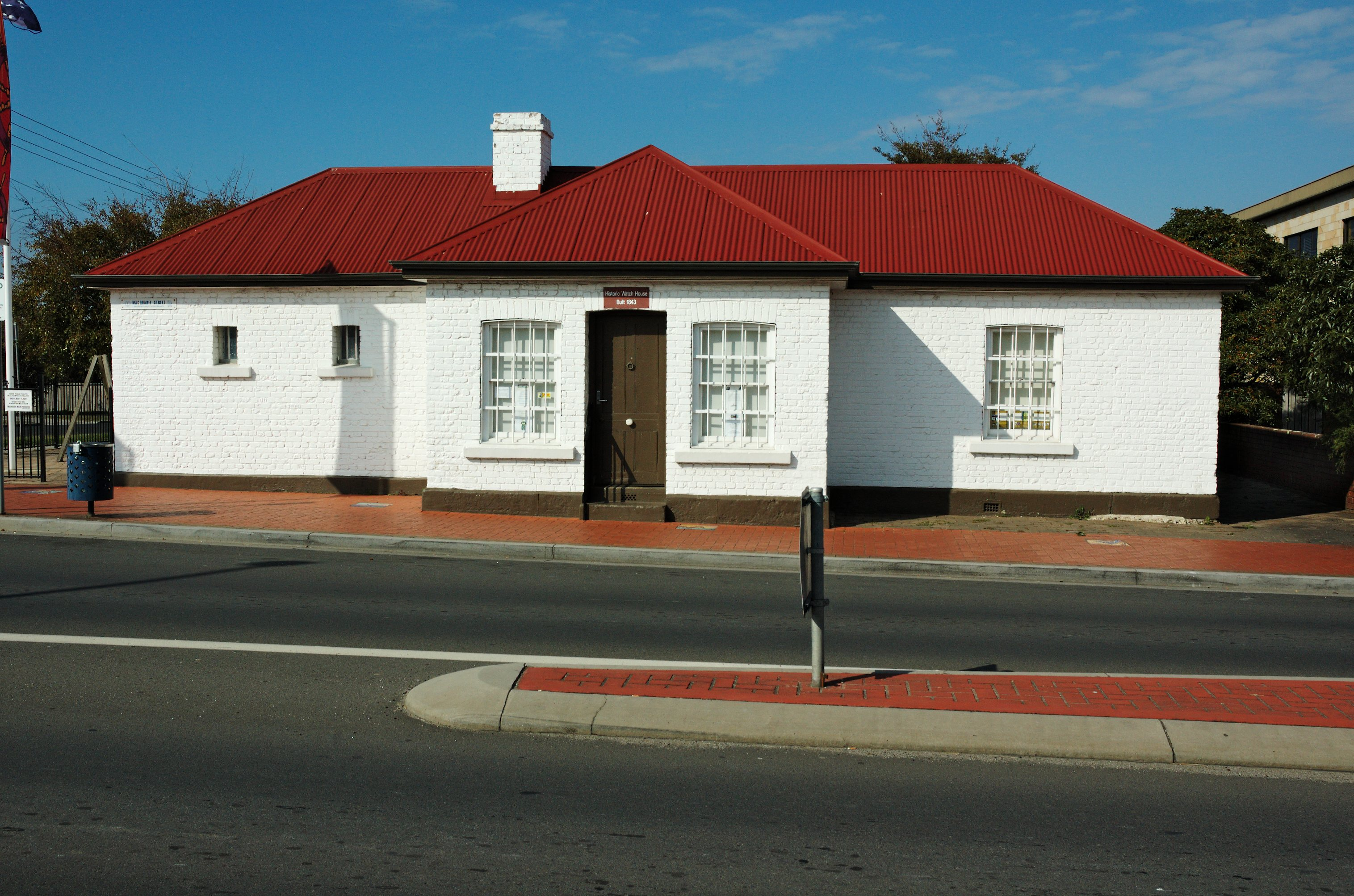
- The Watch House

- Coordinates: 41°06′S 146°49′E
- Country: Australia
- State: Tasmania
- LGA: George Town Council
- Location: 6 km (3.7 mi) from Low Head; 6 km (3.7 mi) from Bell Bay; 23 km (14 mi) from Hillwood; 50 km (31 mi) from Launceston
- Established: 1804

Government
  - State electorate: Bass
  - Federal division: Bass

Population
  - Total: 4,347 (2016 census)
- Time zone: UTC+10 (AEST)
  - Summer (DST): UTC+11 (AEDT)
- Postcode: 7253
- Mean max temp: 16.7 °C (62.1 °F)
- Mean min temp: 10.6 °C (51.1 °F)
- Annual rainfall: 671.6 mm (26.44 in)

George Town (palawa kani: kinimathatakinta) is a large town in north-east Tasmania, on the eastern bank of the mouth of the Tamar River. The Australian Bureau of Statistics records the George Town Municipal Area had a population of 6,764 as of 30 June 2016.

It is the regional centre of the George Town Council local government area and is well served with a regional hospital, supermarkets, and infrastructure.

== History ==
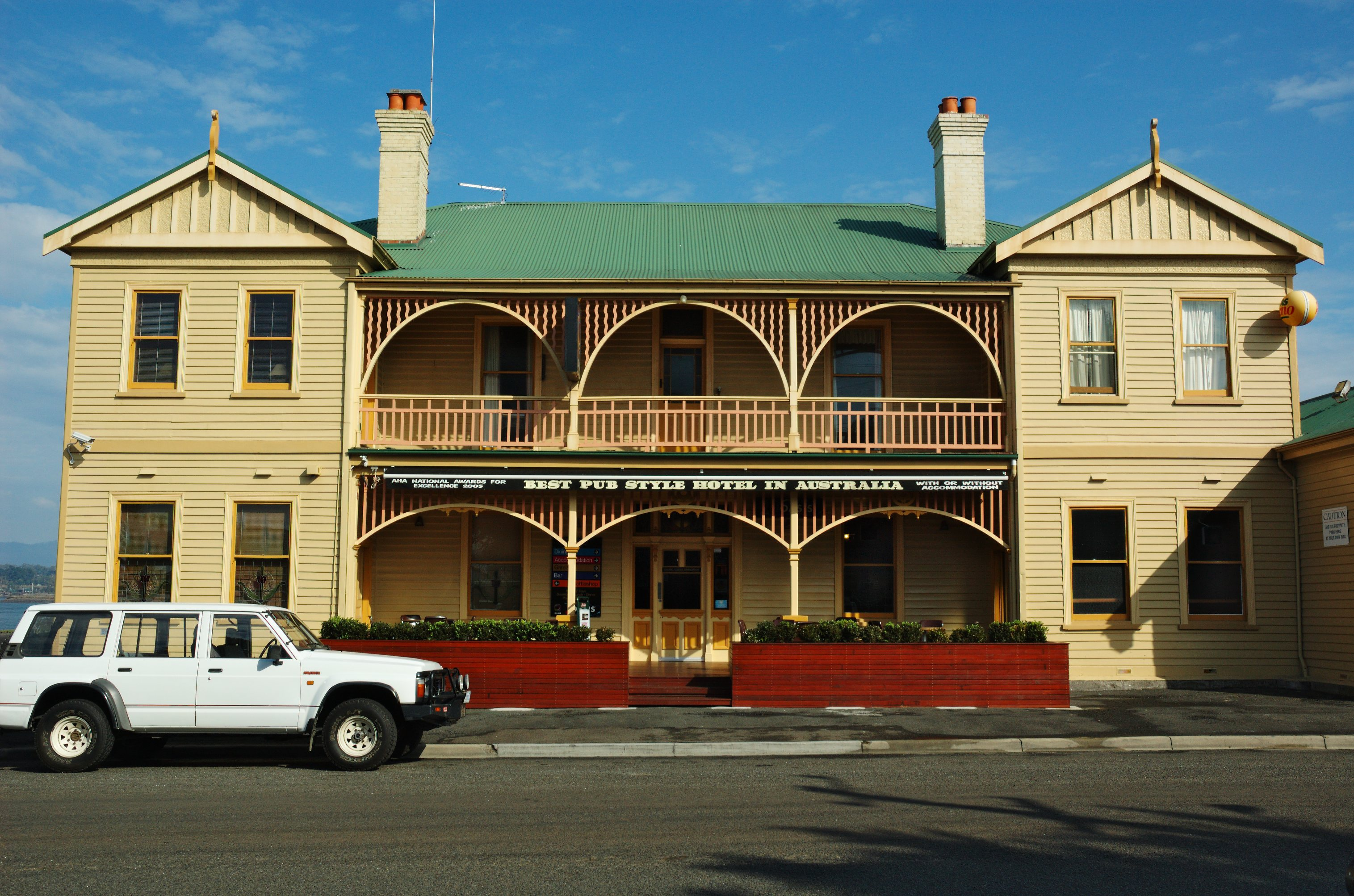
The Pier Hotel

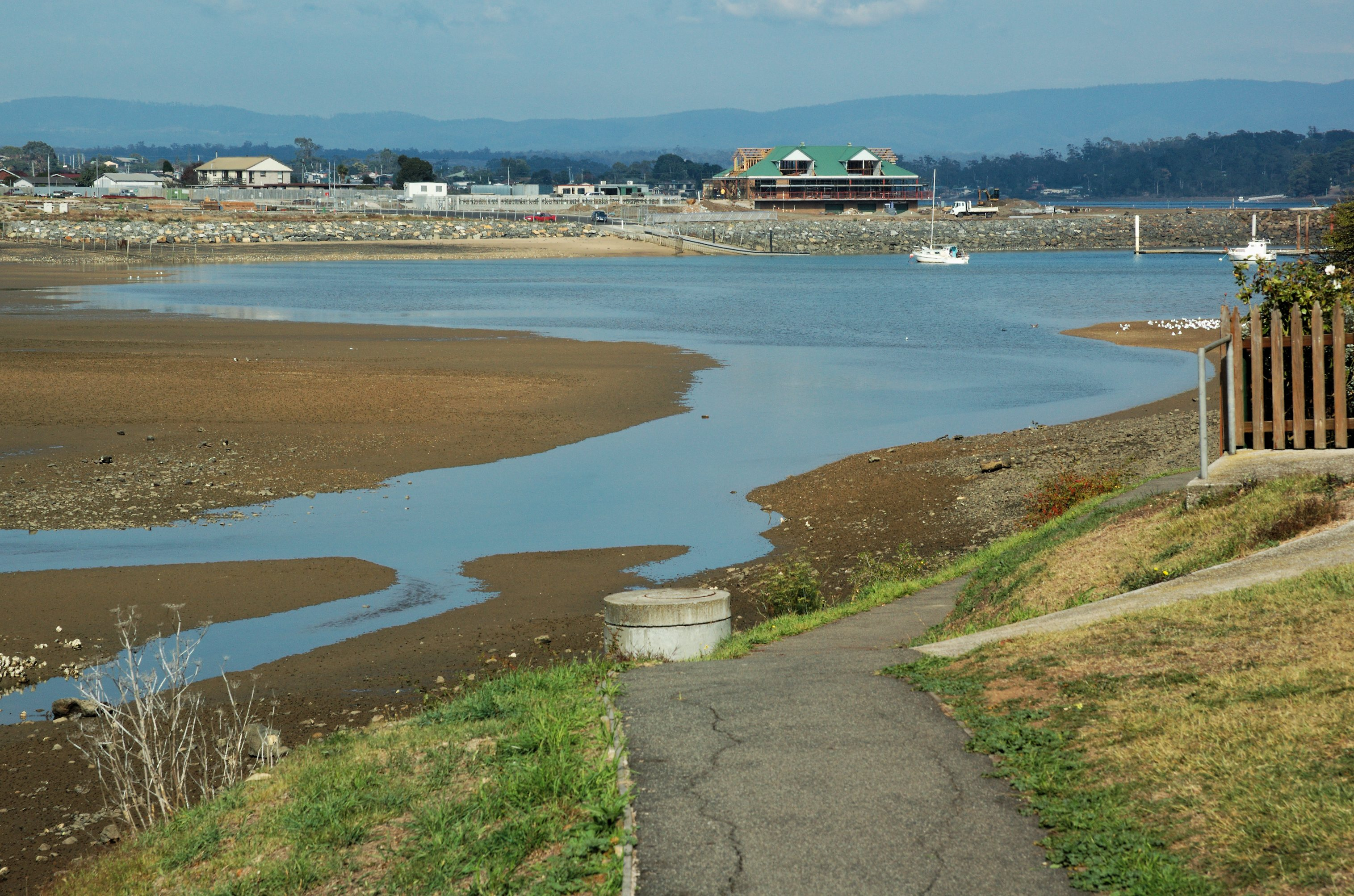
York Cove

The George Town region has been inhabited by Aboriginal Tasmanians since, at least, 7000 BP and possibly as long ago as 43000 BP.

=== European settlement ===
Early observation of the Tamar River occurred in 1798 when Bass and Flinders sailed into the river during their circumnavigation of Tasmania. The estuarine river was named Port Dalrymple and the location that would become George Town was referred to as Outer Cove. William Collins, in January 1804, led an 18-day exploration of the river to determine the best site for a settlement. In November 1804, Colonel William Paterson arrived with four ships with 181 people, convicts, soldiers, and one free settler and the settlement was established at Outer Cove. Subsequently the main settlement moved to the west arm of the river and then to the river head, some 50 km south, named Launceston. When, in 1811, Governor-In-Chief Lachlan Macquarie toured Tasmania he moved the settlement back to Outer Cove and named it George Town after King George III. The populace were reluctant to relocate and building the town in earnest did not begin until 1819. Because of the needs of maintaining a defensible position at the mouth of the river, regardless of the notional main settlement location, the George Town area has been continuously occupied since 1804, making it one of the earliest European settlements in Australia.

=== Early communications ===
1822 – George Town Post Office opened, Mr. W Brown is appointed postmaster on 11 October 1822

1825 – Tamar Valley semaphore system

1869 – Eastern Extension Telegraph Cable connects Tasmania to the Australian mainland

== Geography and landmarks ==
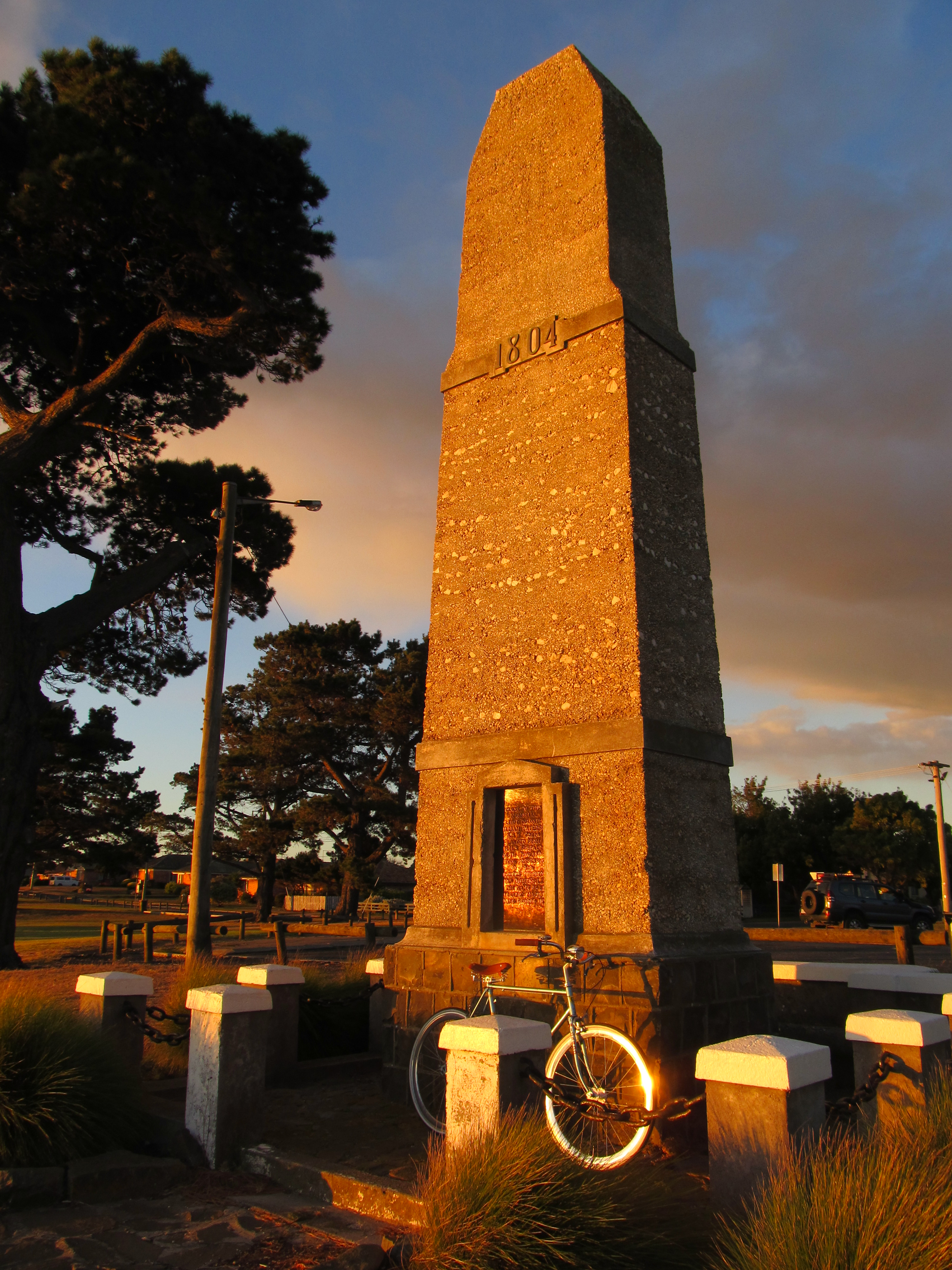
The Paterson Monument

- Mount George
- Tamar Valley Semaphore
- Low Head and Low Head Lighthouse
- Batman Bridge – Joining the George Town Municipality to the West Tamar
- kanamaluka/Tamar River

=== Climate ===
George Town has a mediterranean-influenced oceanic climate (Köppen: Cfb/Csb), with very mild, relatively dry summers and cool, wetter winters. Temperatures are moderated in all seasons by winds originating from the Bass Strait; mitigating temperature extremes. Average maxima vary from 21.2 °C (70.2 °F) in February to 12.8 °C (55.0 °F) in July while average minima fluctuate between 14.6 °C (58.3 °F) in February and 7.0 °C (44.6 °F) in July. Mean average annual precipitation is moderate, 671.6 mm (26.44 in) spread between 133.4 precipitation days, and is concentrated in winter. In addition, the town is not very sunny, with 150.3 cloudy days and only 64.4 clear days per annum. Extreme temperatures have ranged from 28.7 °C (83.7 °F) on 20 February 2000 to 0.5 °C (32.9 °F) on 21 August 2013. Climate data was sourced from Low Head, located 6 kilometres (3.7 mi) north of George Town.

Climate data for George Town (41º03'00"S, 146º47'24"E, 3 m AMSL) (1998–2024 normals and extremes)
Month	Jan	Feb	Mar	Apr	May	Jun	Jul	Aug	Sep	Oct	Nov	Dec	Year
Record high °C (°F)	28.6 (83.5)	28.7 (83.7)	26.1 (79.0)	23.1 (73.6)	20.4 (68.7)	18.0 (64.4)	16.1 (61.0)	17.2 (63.0)	20.6 (69.1)	21.2 (70.2)	24.8 (76.6)	25.7 (78.3)	28.7 (83.7)
Mean daily maximum °C (°F)	20.7 (69.3)	21.2 (70.2)	20.1 (68.2)	17.8 (64.0)	15.4 (59.7)	13.5 (56.3)	12.8 (55.0)	13.1 (55.6)	14.1 (57.4)	15.5 (59.9)	17.5 (63.5)	19.1 (66.4)	16.7 (62.1)
Mean daily minimum °C (°F)	14.5 (58.1)	14.6 (58.3)	13.4 (56.1)	11.2 (52.2)	9.4 (48.9)	7.5 (45.5)	7.0 (44.6)	7.4 (45.3)	8.5 (47.3)	9.6 (49.3)	11.4 (52.5)	12.9 (55.2)	10.6 (51.1)
Record low °C (°F)	8.2 (46.8)	8.1 (46.6)	7.0 (44.6)	3.7 (38.7)	2.6 (36.7)	0.8 (33.4)	0.6 (33.1)	0.5 (32.9)	1.4 (34.5)	3.9 (39.0)	5.1 (41.2)	6.5 (43.7)	0.5 (32.9)
Average precipitation mm (inches)	48.0 (1.89)	27.9 (1.10)	50.6 (1.99)	55.9 (2.20)	61.4 (2.42)	75.2 (2.96)	74.2 (2.92)	76.1 (3.00)	55.6 (2.19)	53.7 (2.11)	50.7 (2.00)	42.5 (1.67)	671.6 (26.44)
Average precipitation days (≥ 0.2 mm)	7.0	6.7	7.8	9.6	12.7	14.1	15.9	15.4	14.2	11.8	9.5	8.7	133.4
Average afternoon relative humidity (%)	68	66	64	66	69	72	71	71	71	68	68	66	68
Average dew point °C (°F)	12.7 (54.9)	13.1 (55.6)	11.8 (53.2)	10.0 (50.0)	8.7 (47.7)	7.5 (45.5)	6.8 (44.2)	7.0 (44.6)	7.6 (45.7)	8.1 (46.6)	10.1 (50.2)	11.0 (51.8)	9.5 (49.2)
Source: Bureau of Meteorology (1998–2024 normals and extremes)

== Infrastructure ==
The Basslink 400 Kilovolt high-voltage direct current submarine cable connecting Tasmania to the National Electricity Market, terminates in George Town.

In 2007 Alinta built the Tamar Valley Power Station a 200 MW gas-fired power station in the vicinity of George Town creating 200 direct and 100 indirect jobs during construction, and generating electricity from 2009.

Nearby Bell Bay has an aluminium and manganese smelter, as well as the port.

George Town has 3 schools:

- South George Town Primary School
- Star of the Sea College
- Port Dalrymple School

== Proposed developments ==
=== Bell Bay pulp mill ===
Gunns Limited had proposed a pulp mill to be built in the area in 2006, however Gunns entered receivership in 2013, with large debt and the mill did not proceed as the company assets were sold.

=== Mountain bike trail ===
George Town Council is developing 80 km of purpose built mountain bike trails over two separate networks - one on the flanks of Mount George near the town centre and the second in the Tippogoree Hills, five-kilometres south of the township. The project is anticipated to be completed by December 2021.

== Attractions ==
"The Grove" Georgian home built in 1829 attracts many visitors, as does the 1805 convict built pilot station at Low Head.

George Town is also a popular seaside destination for swimming, surfing, and fishing and boating enthusiasts.

George Town is home to a Little Penguin colony at the nearby beach at Low Head.

The George Town Football Club, George Town Bowls Club, George Town Junior Soccer Club and the George Town Cricket Club are notable among its clubs and associations.

The Bass and Flinders Maritime Museum has a collection of historical boats including a replica of the 1798 sloop Norfolk.

The Watch House in Macquarie street built in 1843 was the town gaol. The building was refurbished and reopened in 2004 as a gallery and local history museum. It features a scale model of the town as it was in the early nineteenth century.

George Town is home to a vibrant arts community. The Lighthouse Regional Arts group hold a yearly art show, have local and interstate travelling displays at the Watch House and have permanent displays of art at the Bass and Flinders centre, the Low Head pilot station and the Jim Mooney Gallery.

The George Town RSL Military Museum/display in Macquarie Street is one of Tasmania's more diverse Military Museums and has a large static display from conflicts ranging from the 1880s to present day. The collection covers both Australian and overseas militaria and history as well as possibly the only collection of Third Reich artifacts on display in the state.

== Media ==
George Town has a local radio station – Tamar FM 95.3, which is a community radio station generally playing music and advertising local businesses.

== Events ==
Some main events that happen annually in George Town include:

- The Tamar Valley Folk Festival, which takes place on the third full weekend in January (one week after the Cygnet Folk Festival) and features performances from local, interstate and sometimes even international musicians, as well as workshops, sessions and other festive events
- Steampunk Tasmania Festival
- George Town New Years Eve Extravaganza hosted by The George Town Neighbourhood House and The Crazy Duck
- Don Mario's Classic Cars and Coffee – classic car enthusiast meet-up and display, 1st Sunday of each month

== Notable people ==
Notable people from or who have lived in George Town include:

- John Youl, an early clergyman
- Brendon Bolton, coach of Carlton Football Club in the Australian Football League
- Danny Clark, cyclist
