= Launceston, Tasmania =

City in Tasmania, Australia

Launceston
- City
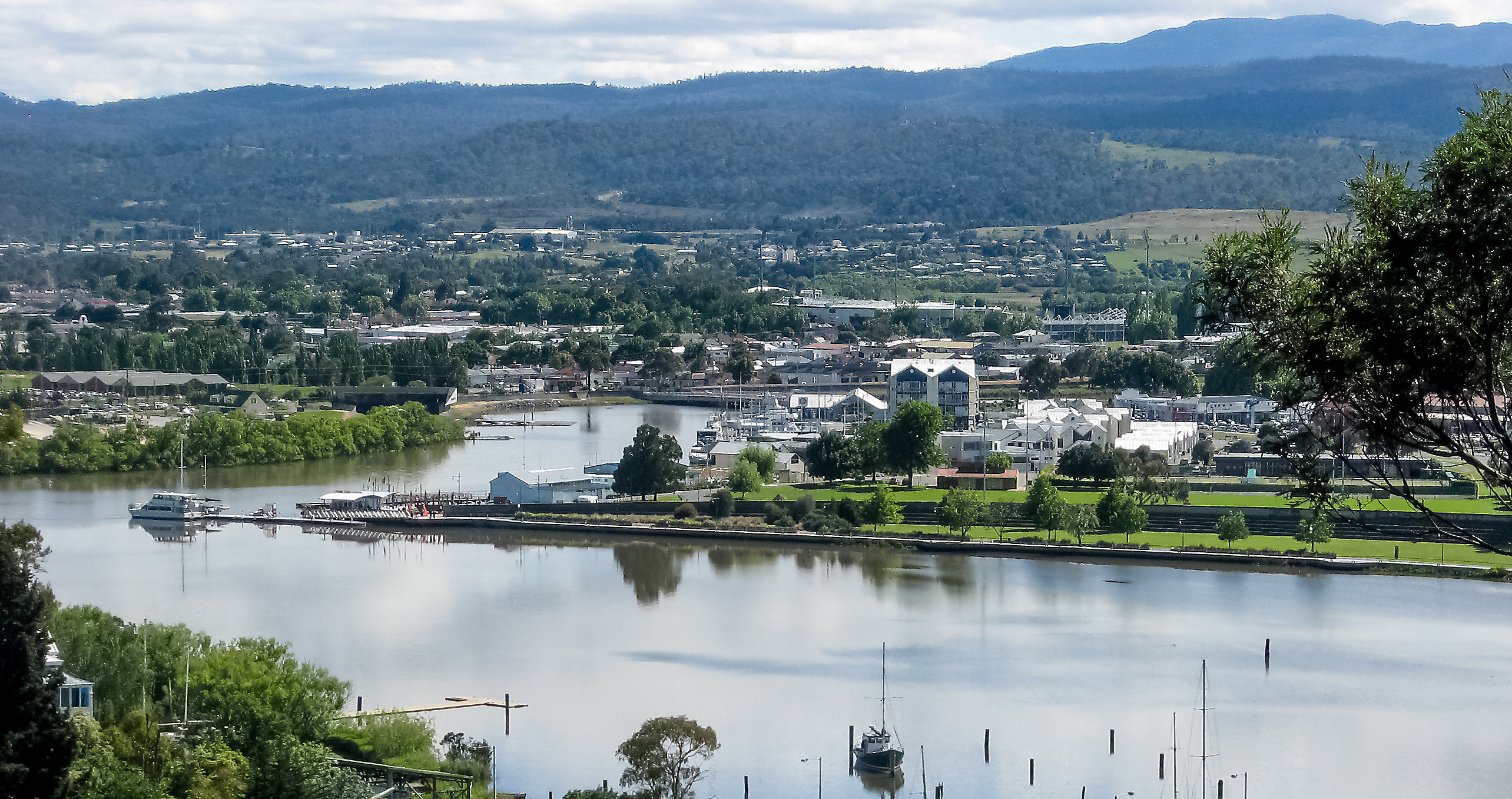
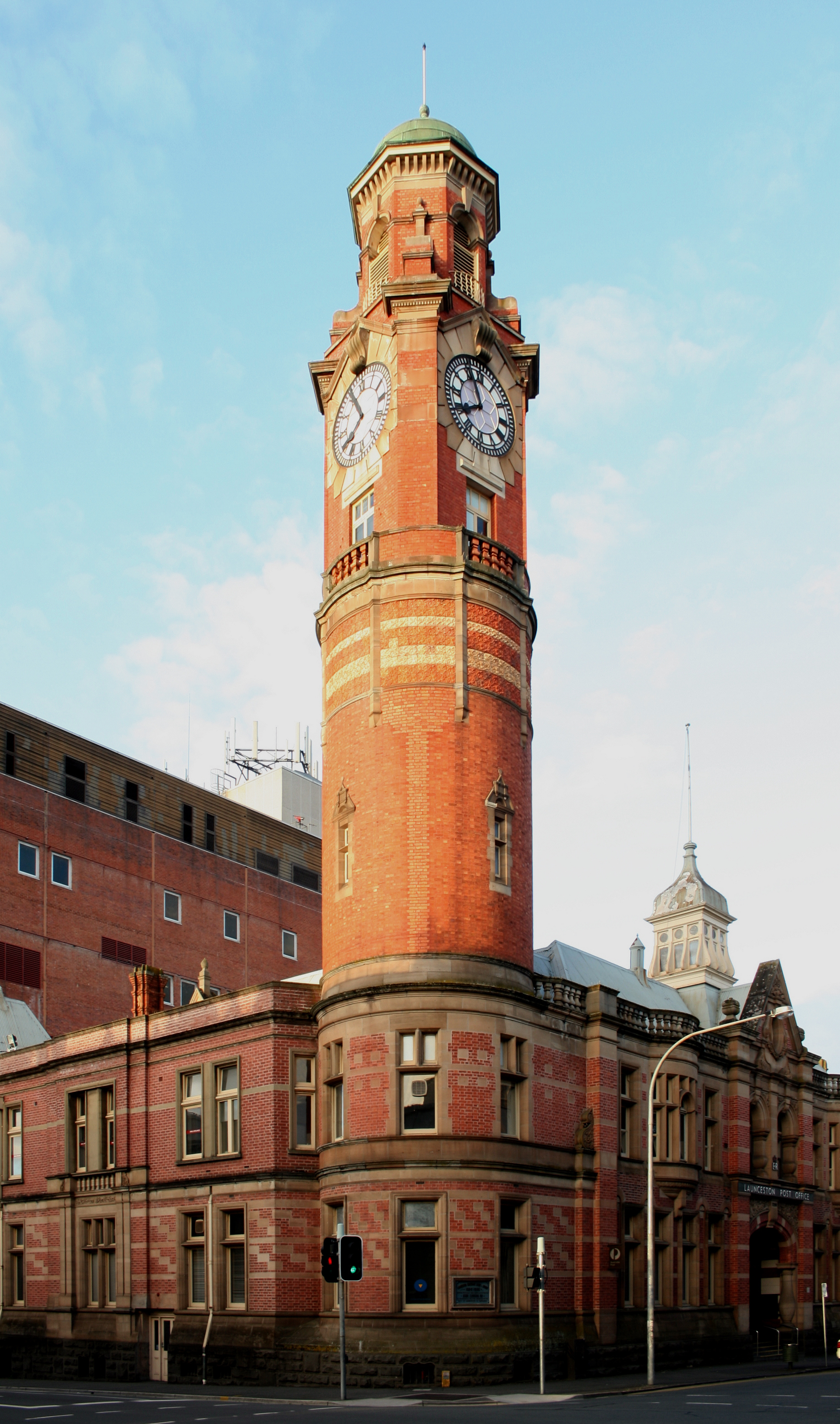
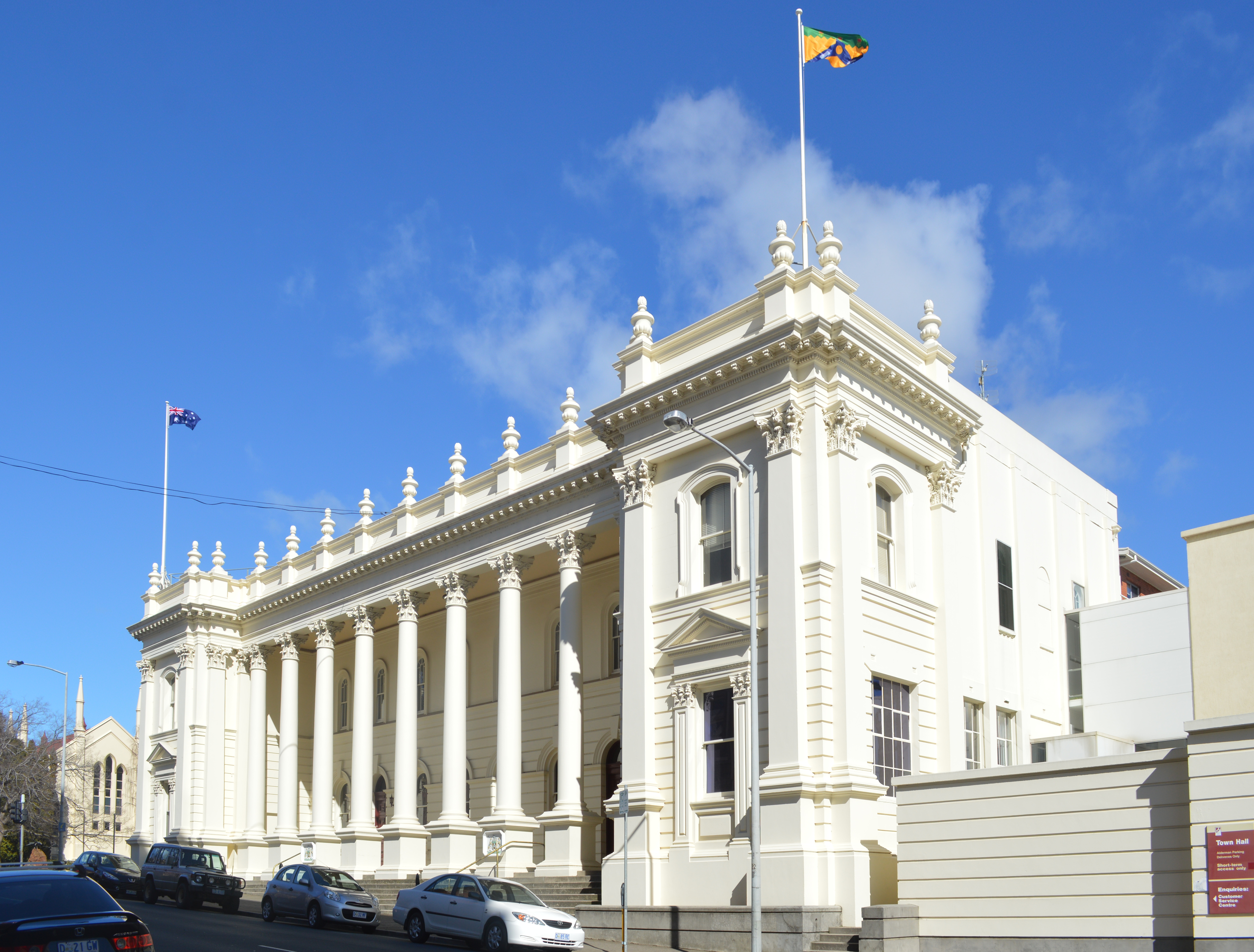
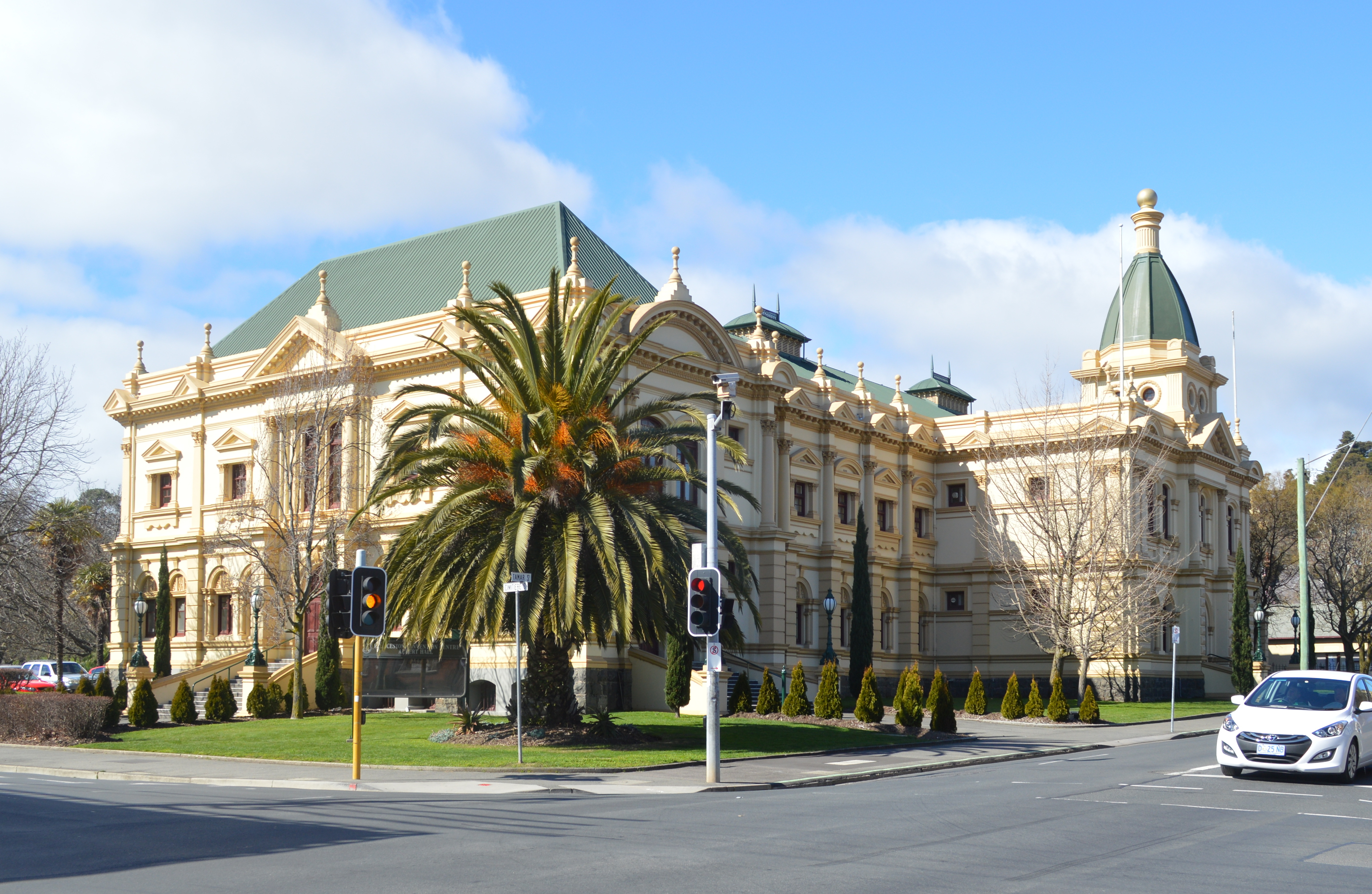
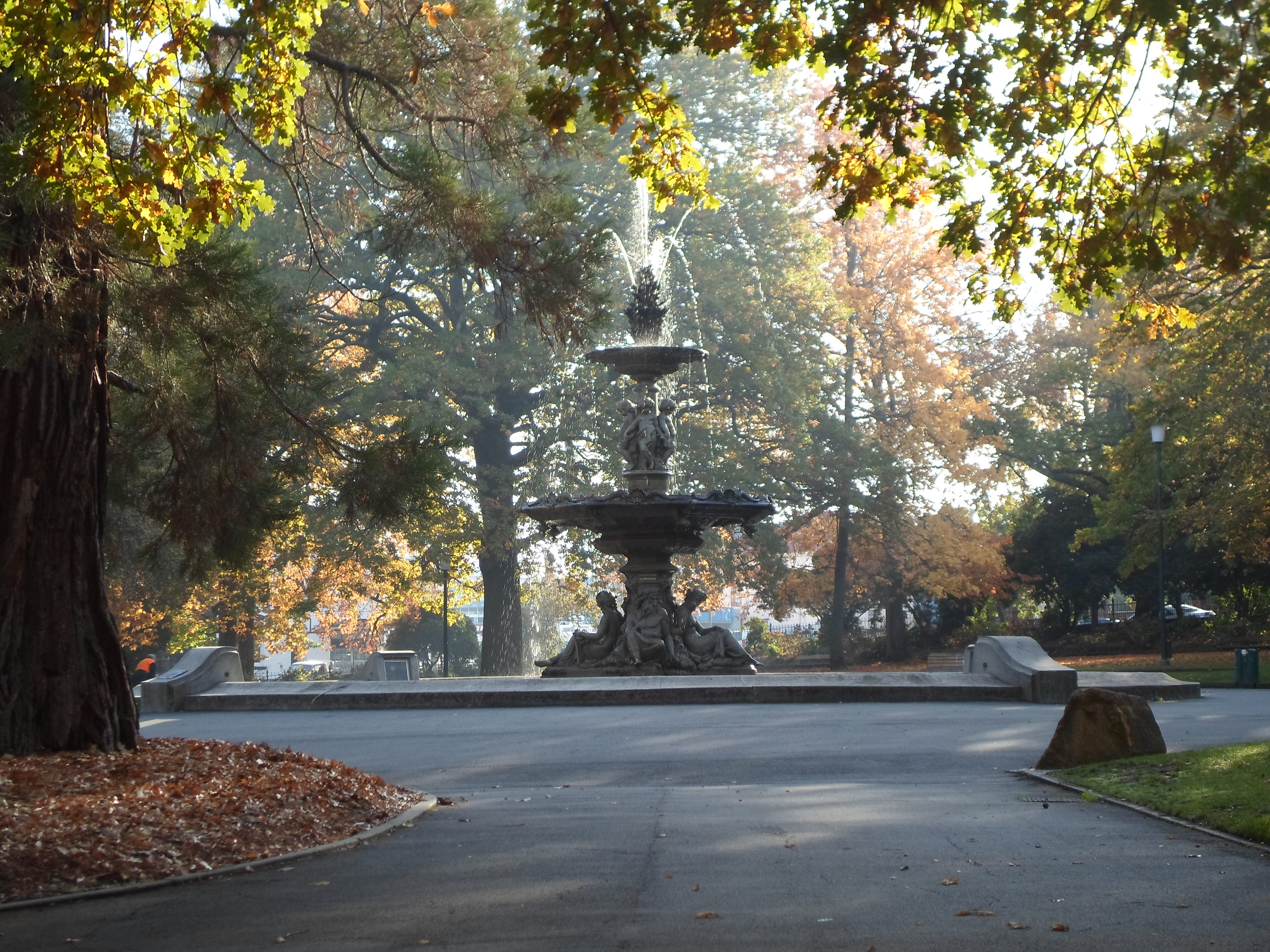
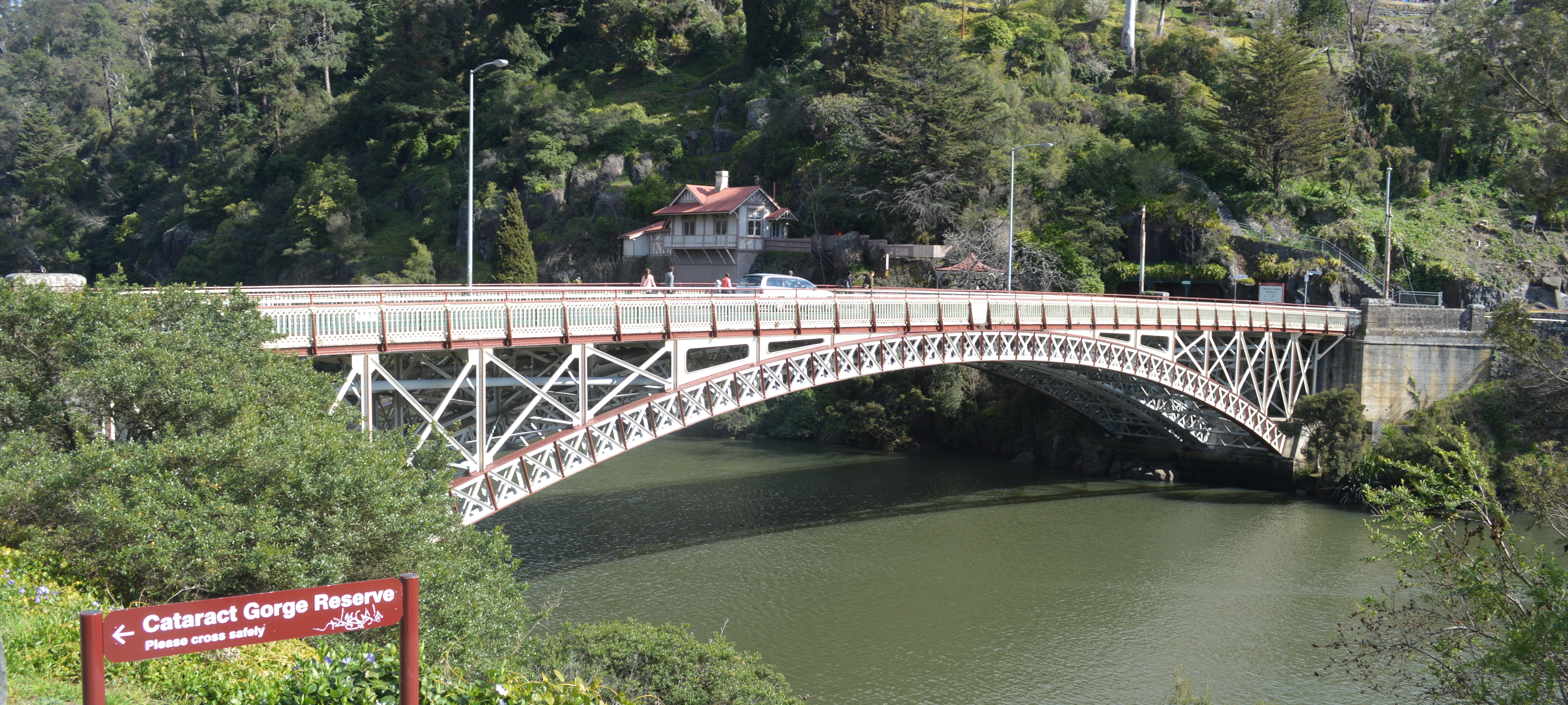
- Panorama General Post Office Launceston Town Hall Albert Hall Prince's Square King's Bridge

- Coordinates: 41°26′31″S 147°08′42″E
- Country: Australia
- State: Tasmania
- Region: North-east
- LGA: City of Launceston
- Location: 67 km (42 mi) SW of Scottsdale; 101 km (63 mi) SE of Devonport; 145 km (90 mi) SE of Burnie; 201 km (125 mi) N of Hobart
- Established: 1806

Government
  - Mayor: Matthew Garwood
  - State electorates: Bass; Lyons
  - Federal divisions: Bass; Lyons

Area (2011 urban)
  - Total: 435.4 km^{2} (168.1 sq mi)
- Elevation: 15 m (49 ft)

Population
  - Total: 90,953 (2021) (21st)
  - Density: 208.895/km^{2} (541.04/sq mi)
- Time zone: UTC+10 (AEST)
  - Summer (DST): UTC+11 (AEDT)
- Postcode: 7250
- County: Cornwall
- Mean max temp: 18.6 °C (65.5 °F)
- Mean min temp: 7.4 °C (45.3 °F)
- Annual rainfall: 687.0 mm (27.05 in)
Localities around Launceston
Exeter	Weymouth	Lilydale
Deloraine	Launceston	Mount Barrow
Great Lake	Perth	Campbell Town

Launceston (/ˈlɒnsɛstən/ LON-sess-tən) is a city in the north of Tasmania, Australia, at the confluence of the North Esk and South Esk rivers where they become the River Tamar (kanamaluka). As of 2021, the Launceston urban area has a population of 90,953. Launceston is the second most populous city in Tasmania after the state capital, Hobart. As of 2020, Launceston is the 18th largest city in Australia. Launceston is the fifth-largest inland city and the ninth-largest non-capital city in Australia. Launceston is regarded as the most livable regional city, and was one of the most popular regional cities to move to in Australia from 2020 to 2021. Launceston was named Australian Town of the Year in 2022.

Settled by Europeans in March 1806, Launceston is one of Australia's oldest cities and it has many historic buildings. Like many places in Australia, it was named after a town in the United Kingdom – in this case, Launceston, Cornwall. Launceston also had the first use of anaesthetic in the Southern Hemisphere, it was the first Australian city to have underground sewers, and it was the first Australian city to be lit by hydroelectricity. The city has a maritime climate with four distinct seasons and is appreciably warmer than the south of the island during summer. Local government is split between the City of Launceston, Meander Valley and West Tamar Councils.

== History ==
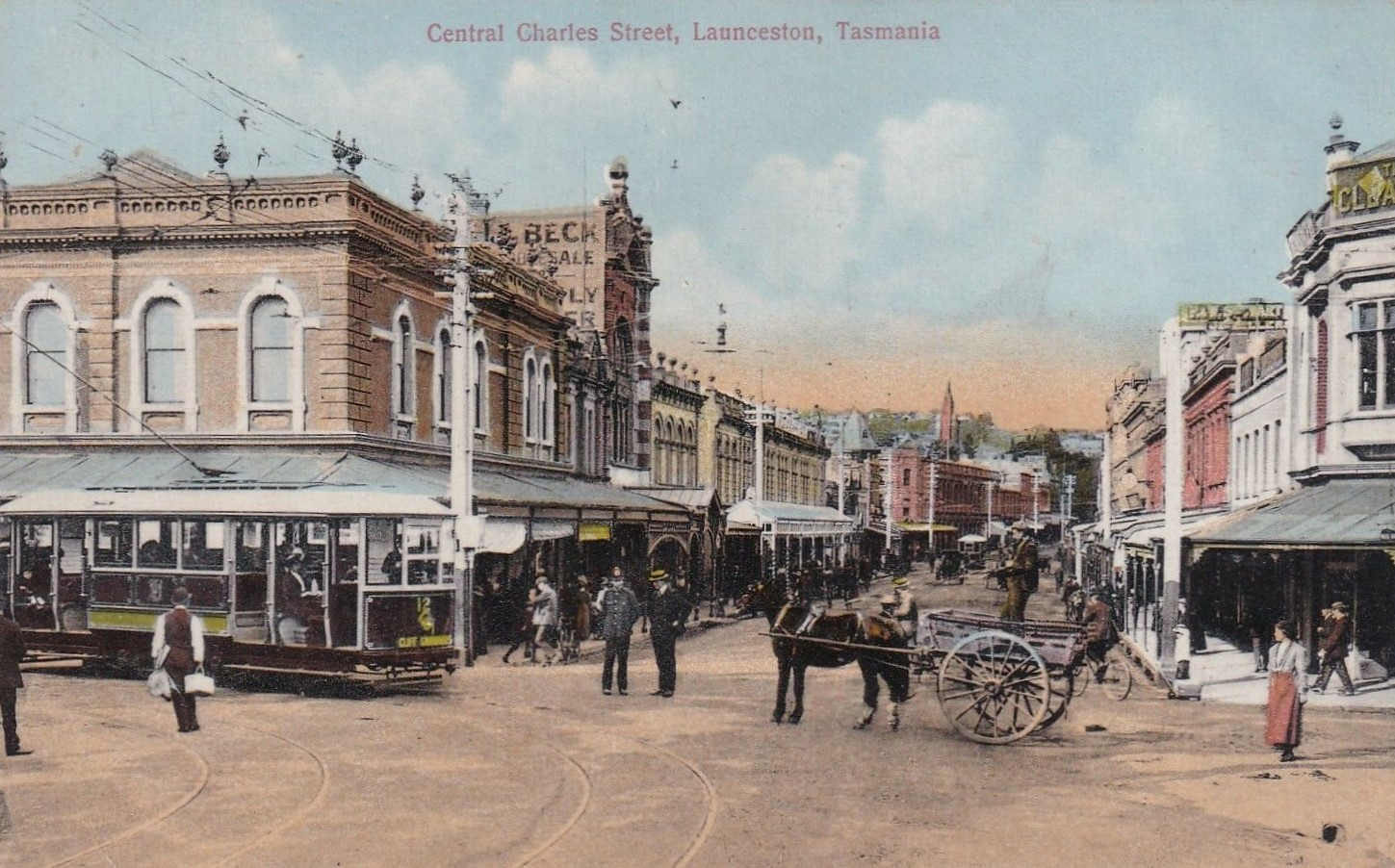
Central Charles Street, c. 1917

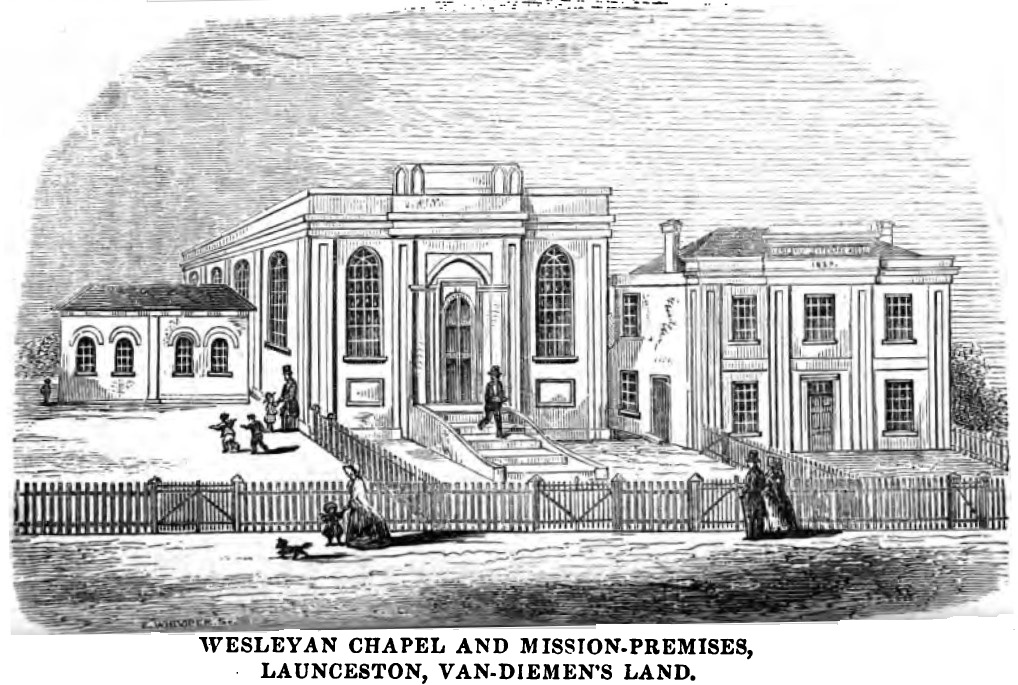
Wesleyan Chapel and Mission-Premises, Launceston, Van-Diemen's Island, June 1855.

The first inhabitants of the area of Launceston were largely nomadic Aboriginal Tasmanians believed to have been part of the Northern Midlands Nations. Three Nations made up the area around so called Launceston, the Stoney Creek Nation, Tyerenotepanner; Panninher and Lettermairrener.

The first White explorers arrived in 1798, when George Bass and Matthew Flinders were sent to explore the possibility that there was a strait between Australia and Van Diemen's Land, now Tasmania. They originally landed in Port Dalrymple at the mouth of the Tamar River, 40 kilometres (25 mi) to the north-west of Launceston.

The first significant colonial settlement in the region dates from 1804, when the commandant of the colonial garrison. Lt. Col. William Paterson, and his men set up a camp on the current site of George Town. A few weeks later, the settlement was moved across the river to York Town. In 1805, they moved to where Launceston stands.

Initially, the settlement was called Patersonia. Paterson later changed the name to Launceston in honour of the New South Wales Governor Captain Philip Gidley King, who was born in Launceston, Cornwall. The name still survives in the tiny hamlet of Patersonia 18 kilometres (11 mi) north-east of Launceston. Paterson himself also served as Lieutenant-Governor of northern Van Diemen's Land from 1804 to 1808.

The geographical area in which Launceston is now located was previously occupied by the Aboriginal Tasmanian Letteremairrener people. The Letteremairrener country encompasses most of the Tamar Valley region. In 1804, reports from early European voyagers describe a number of Letteremairrener camps, consisting of up to ten bark huts located on either side of the Tamar River. Extensive archeological evidence suggests that occupation and usage of the Tamar basin can be dated from at least 7,000 years ago, although it was likely used as long as 35,000 years ago.

The Letteremairrener, as seasonal hunter-gatherers, spent the winter months near George Town and the summer months residing on Ben Lomond, before returning to the banks of the Tamar River for the mutton-bird season. Campbell Macknight characterizes early colonial contact with the Letteremairrener people as a mixture of fear, curiosity and aggression.

After several aggressive encounters prompted by bands of Letteremairrener in 1806, most likely as revenge for the colonists trespassing and hunting on their land without permission, Colonel William Patterson, in charge of the new settlement in Launceston, led a series of putative skirmishes that were ostensibly continued by colonists until 1831. These conflicts intensified from 1827 until 1831 during the period of the Black War, with genocidal expeditions occurring within the Letteremairrener country and neighbouring areas.

By 1827, Launceston's population had climbed to 2,000 and the town had become an export centre, mainly for the colony's northern pastoral industry. Small hotels and breweries began to emerge in the 1820s before larger, more "substantial" hotels were built in the 1830s.

Ships from Launceston carried parties of sealers to the islands of Bass Strait early in the 19th century. They also took whalers to the coast of Victoria in the 1820s and 1830s where they established temporary bay whaling stations. Some of these temporary communities, such as the ones at Portland Bay and Port Fairy, were the forerunner of permanent settlement of those places. Expeditions from Launceston were involved in the Foundation of Melbourne.

Walter George Arthur, who petitioned Queen Victoria in 1847 while interned with other Aboriginal Tasmanians on Flinders Island, lived for several years in Launceston as one of numerous homeless children, before being taken into custody by George Augustus Robinson who sent him to the Boys' Orphan School in Hobart in 1832.

Newer popular team sports such as cricket and football failed to be sustained in Launceston before the population grew substantially. The sports were initially middle class recreations, as the working class found it difficult to participate after a six-day working week. Nevertheless, a "demand for facilities" led to the upgrade of the Northern Tasmanian Cricket Association Ground (NTCA Ground) among other sporting facilities in the 1860s. Not long beforehand, Tasmania played Victoria in Australia's first first-class cricket match at the NTCA Ground in 1851.

Tin was discovered at Mount Bischoff in 1871 in north-western Tasmania, starting a minerals boom. Gold mining commenced about 50 kilometres (31 mi) away in Beaconsfield in 1877. During the following two decades Launceston grew from a small town into an urban centre. In 1889, Launceston was the second town in Tasmania to be declared a city, after state capital Hobart. During the late 1880s, a small periodical called Launceston Literary contained stories as well as memoirs of the pioneering days of the region. The publication was distributed from a store in the northern end of the town, and while largely forgotten today, was at the time considered relatively popular, if at times controversial.

== Demographics ==
In the 2021 census the population of Launceston was 76,849. Launceston is the 21st most populous city in Australia.

- Aboriginal and Torres Strait Islander people made up 3.5% of the population.
- 79.2% of people were born in Australia. The next most common countries of birth were United Kingdom 2.9%, Nepal 1.6%, India 1.5%, China 0.9% and New Zealand 0.8%.
- 85.1% of people spoke only English at home. Other languages spoken at home included Nepali 2.3%, Mandarin 1.2%, Punjabi 0.5%, Urdu 0.4% and Vietnamese 0.3%.
- The most common responses for religion were No Religion 47.9%, Anglican 13.8% and Catholic 12.1%.

== City of Gastronomy ==
Launceston's designation as a UNESCO City of Gastronomy in 2021 signifies global acknowledgment of this gastronomic paradise.

== Geography ==
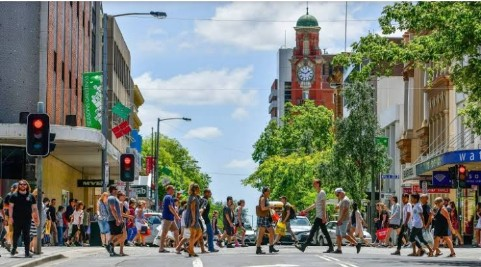
Brisbane Street, Launceston in summer.

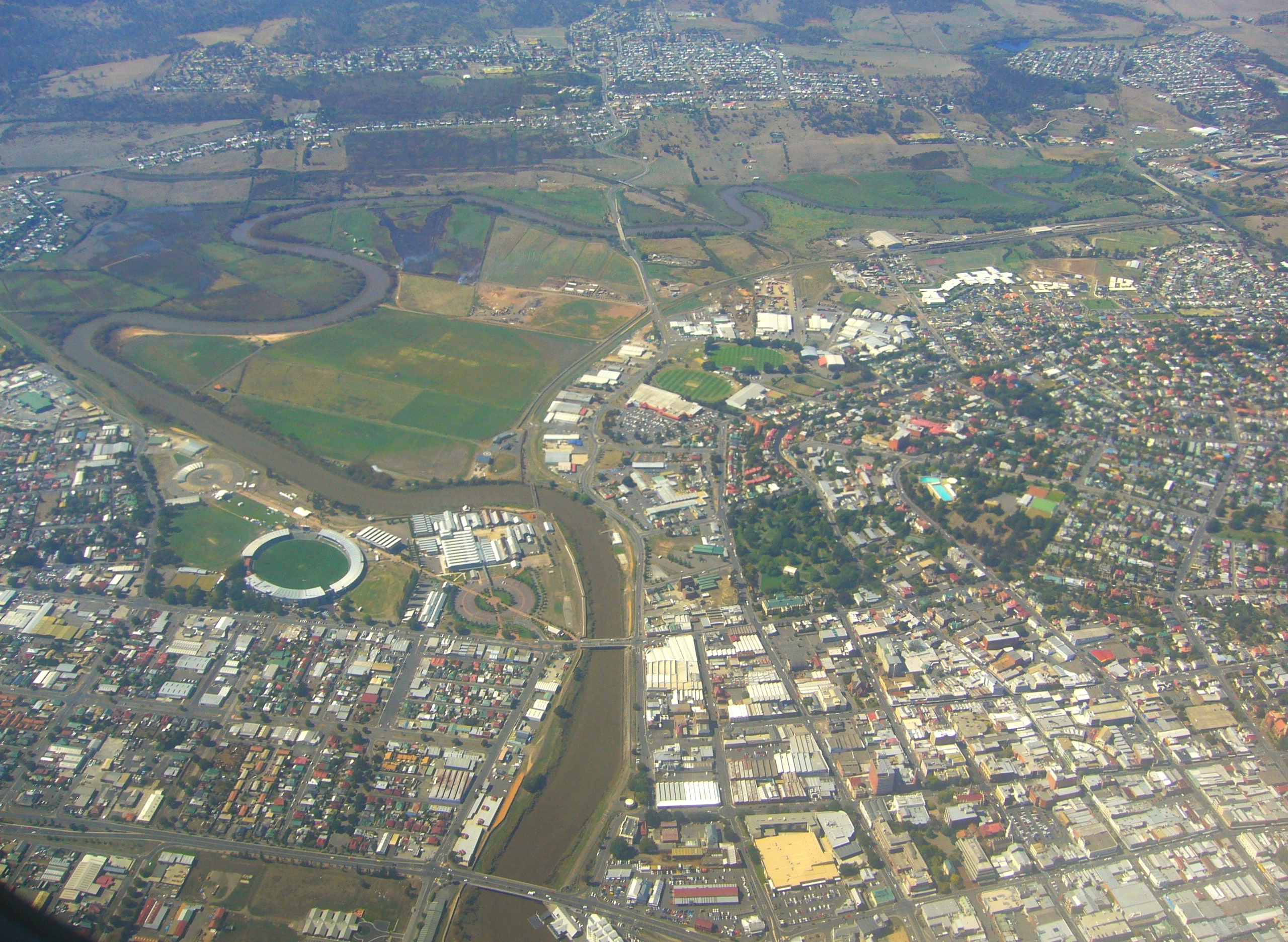
An aerial view of Launceston

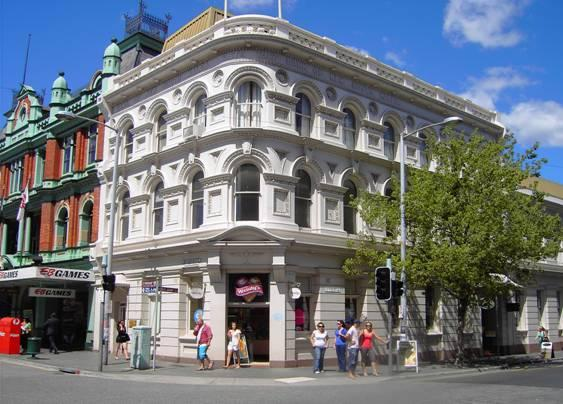
Heritage Bank of NSW, corner of St John and Brisbane Streets

Launceston is at 41°26′31″S 147°8′42″E in the Tamar Valley, Northern Tasmania. The valley was formed by volcanic and glacial forces over 10 million years ago. The city is about 45 kilometres (28 mi) south of the Bass Strait, with its closest neighbour-city being Devonport, about 99 kilometres (62 mi) to the north west. Launceston combines steep, originally heavily wooded ridges, and low-lying areas, originally wetlands – with parts of the suburbs of Inveresk and Invermay below high-tide level. As a result, areas of Launceston are subject to landslip problems. Others areas are liable to poor drainage and periodic flooding. The topography of the area is not conducive to easy dispersion of airborne pollution, due to the phenomenon of thermal inversion.

Since the 1990s, Launceston's air quality has improved. A 2007 study indicated that 73% percent of air pollution in Launceston and surrounding areas during the winter period was caused by wood smoke, while about 8% was from motor vehicle pollution. During the early 1990s about 60% of households used wood heaters, but since the mid-2000s only 25–30% of households use wood heating. In the 2011 Tasmanian Air Monitoring report, particulate matter met the Air NEPM goals starting in 2006, and did not exceed the PM10 standard in the years 2009–2011.

Launceston is situated at the confluence of the South Esk River and the North Esk River, forming the Tamar River estuary. It is used for commercial and recreational shipping and boating. In earlier years, oceangoing shipping used the river to obtain access to the Port of Launceston wharves located in the city centre and Invermay. The Port for Launceston is now located at the George Town suburb of Bell Bay, some 40 kilometres (25 mi) downstream on the east bank of the Tamar estuary, close to the river mouth.

The South Esk River is the longest river in Tasmania. It starts in the North East Mountains near Roses Tier and flows through the Fingal Valley where it passes through the towns of Fingal and Avoca before flowing into the Northern Midlands where it flows through the towns of Evandale, Perth, Longford and Hadspen before reaching Launceston via the Cataract Gorge.

The river is dammed at Lake Trevallyn on the upper reaches of the Cataract Gorge, with water being diverted into the Trevallyn Power Station with runoff flowing into the remainder of the Cataract Gorge and eventually merging with the Tamar River. The North Esk River starts in the Northallerton Valley in Tasmania's north-east mountains and winds its way to Launceston via the Corra Linn Gorge at White Hills. The St Patrick's River, the largest tributary of the North Esk, is dammed at Nunamara to provide the majority of Launceston's town water since the mid-1800s.

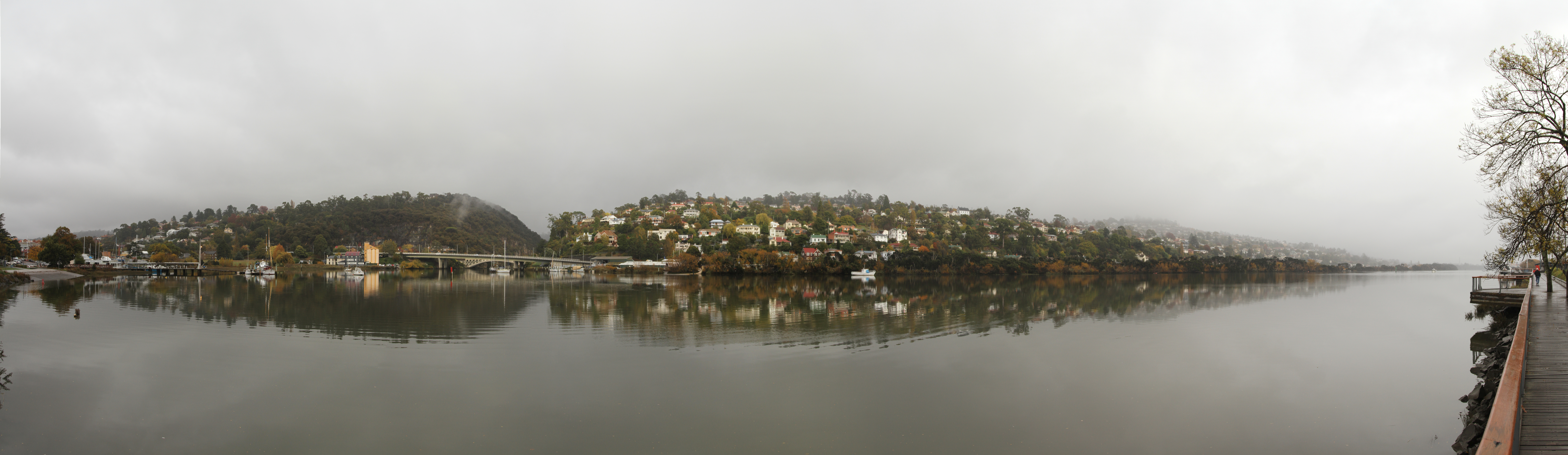
A panorama of the confluence of the Tamar River and its tributaries, the South Esk River and the North Esk River

=== Flooding and levee system ===
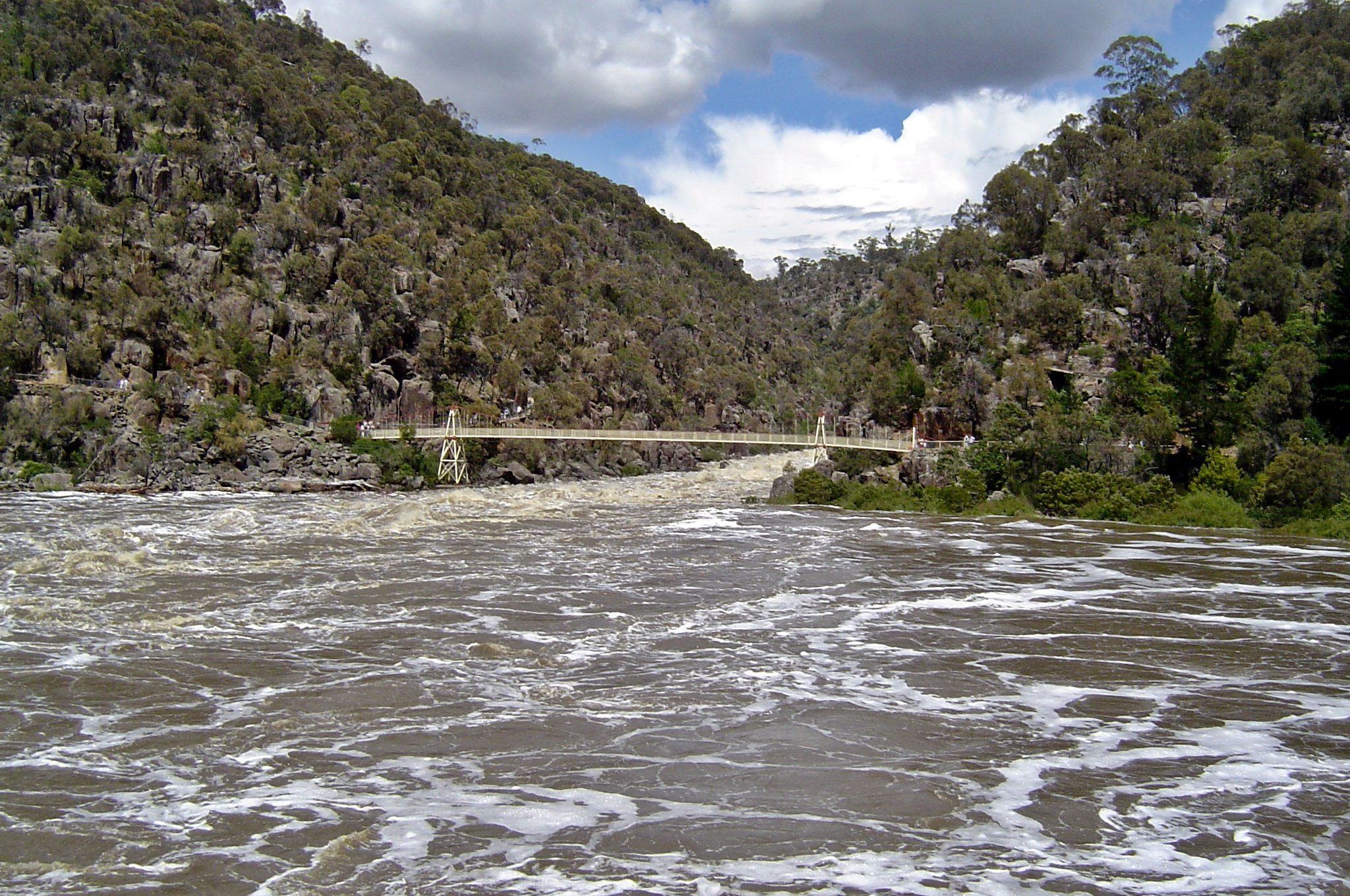
Cataract Gorge during the 2003 flood

Since the 1960s, parts of Launceston have been protected by a series of flood levees that reach up to 4 metres (13 ft) in height as large portions of the suburbs Invermay and Newstead sit within a flood plain. The last major flood occurred in 1929 when Invermay was completely devastated. More than 4,000 people were left homeless after just one night of flooding. Since then, there have only been minor floods. Work was under way in 2011 on a $59 million flood levee upgrade that should protect the city from 1-in-200-year events, that was then expected to take five to six years to construct.

The council acquired land used by eighteen businesses on the south side of Lindsay Street in Invermay, with businesses having until July 2009 to leave. In 2016 the Tamar River flooded resulting in the widespread flooding of low lying suburbs. The St Leonards and West Tamar Highways were temporarily closed as water levels rose, causing significant disruption to the city and loss of livestock.

=== Climate ===
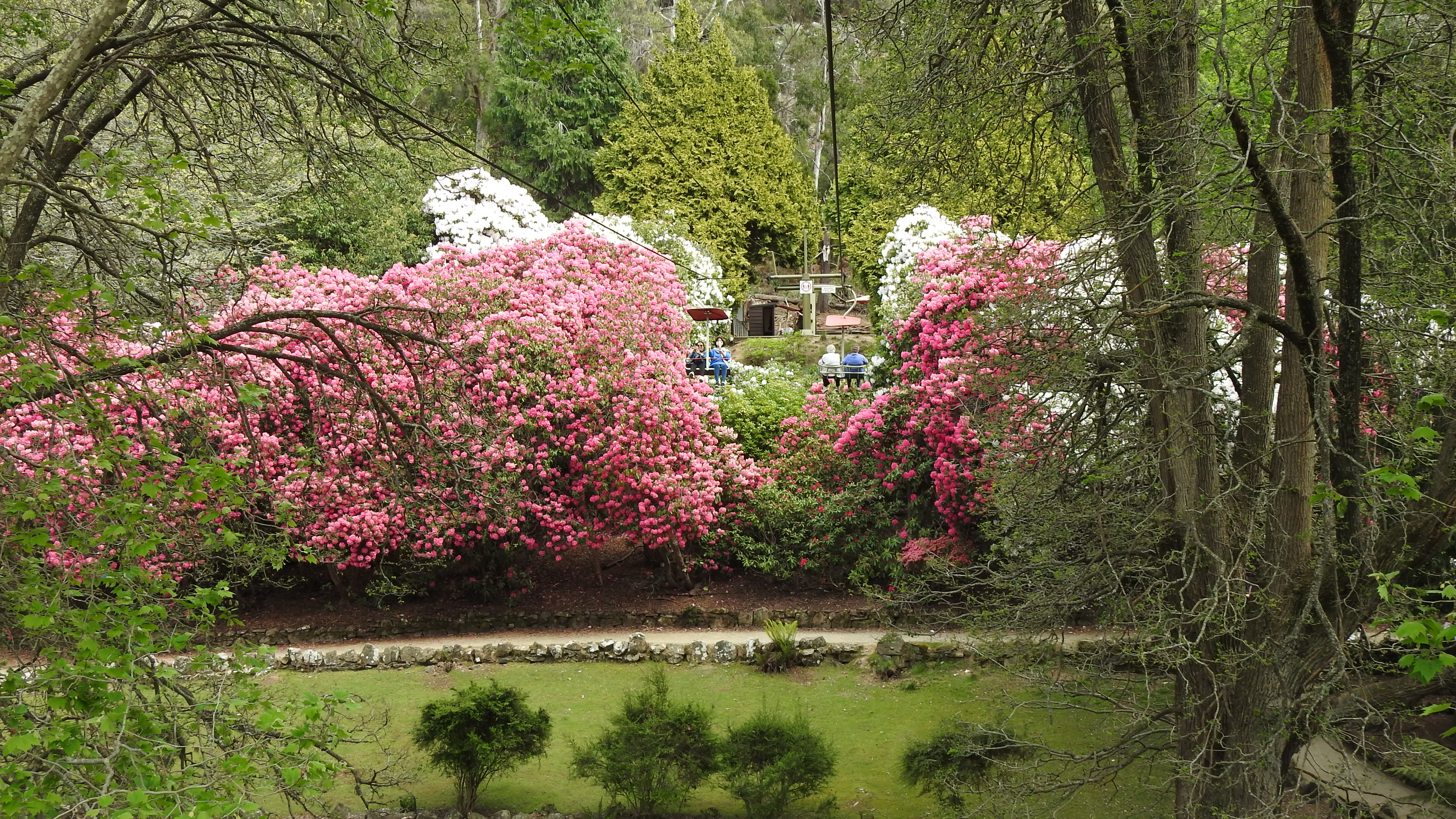
Rhododendrons in spring at Cataract Gorge

Launceston has an oceanic climate (Köppen: Cfb), bordering on a warm-summer Mediterranean climate (Köppen: Csb), with mild to warm, somewhat dry summers and cool damp winters with chilly nights. Launceston is located in the Tamar Valley and is surrounded by many large hills and mountains. With this type of topography, Launceston's weather patterns can change considerably in a short period. The warmest months are in January and February with an average air temperature range of 12.2 to 24.4 °C (54 to 76 °F). Throughout the year there is an average of 4.3 days a year over 30 °C (86 °F). The maximum recorded temperature was 39 °C (102 °F) on 30 January 2009, with Launceston Airport reaching 40.4 °C (105 °F) on that same day, during the 2009 Southeastern Australia heat wave. The city averages 67.3 clear days and 148.8 cloudy days per annum.

Winters are cool with minimum temperatures dropping below 2 °C (36 °F) an average of 61 days a year. The coldest month is July, with an average temperature range of 2.2 to 12.5 °C (36 to 55 °F). The lowest recorded minimum at Launceston's weather station, Ti Tree Bend was −5.2 °C (22.6 °F) on 21 July 1991. Launceston very rarely receives snowfall, with snow falling in 1951 and 1986, and again on 3 August 2015, when most of the state received snowfall due to a cold front moving up from Antarctica. On the night of 4 August 2020, Launceston received an inch of snow on the ground, with varying levels around the state.

Winter, for Launceston, is also the season with the least amount of wind. Because of this and the topographical effect of the Tamar Valley, Launceston winters are renowned for foggy mornings, with Launceston Airport the most fog-bound commercial airport in Australia. The average annual rainfall, with moderate to low variability, is 665 mm (26 in), falling on an average of 88.4 days a year. The most rain Ti Tree Bend has received in a year was 829.6 millimetres (32.66 in) in 1992, though Launceston Airport received 953.1 millimetres (37.52 in) in 1956. As in most of Tasmania, 2006 was the driest year, when just 394.8 millimetres (15.54 in) fell.

2007 was the warmest year ever recorded in Launceston since temperatures were first recorded in 1884. Temperatures ranged from a minimum of 8.1 °C (46.6 °F) to a maximum of 19.2 °C (66.6 °F). In 2006 and 2007, Launceston had the hottest maxima throughout the state. In 2008, Launceston had the highest average maximum temperature out of all Tasmanian cities with 18.6 °C (65.5 °F).

Climate data for Launceston (1991–2020 normals, extremes 1980–present)
Month	Jan	Feb	Mar	Apr	May	Jun	Jul	Aug	Sep	Oct	Nov	Dec	Year
Record high °C (°F)	39.0 (102.2)	34.4 (93.9)	33.5 (92.3)	27.7 (81.9)	22.9 (73.2)	18.4 (65.1)	18.4 (65.1)	20.3 (68.5)	24.8 (76.6)	28.7 (83.7)	30.7 (87.3)	34.1 (93.4)	39.0 (102.2)
Mean maximum °C (°F)	32.1 (89.8)	30.4 (86.7)	29.0 (84.2)	23.8 (74.8)	20.0 (68.0)	16.8 (62.2)	16.1 (61.0)	17.5 (63.5)	20.3 (68.5)	24.1 (75.4)	27.3 (81.1)	29.6 (85.3)	32.6 (90.7)
Mean daily maximum °C (°F)	24.8 (76.6)	24.6 (76.3)	22.7 (72.9)	18.9 (66.0)	15.8 (60.4)	13.3 (55.9)	12.8 (55.0)	13.8 (56.8)	15.7 (60.3)	18.2 (64.8)	20.6 (69.1)	22.7 (72.9)	18.7 (65.6)
Daily mean °C (°F)	18.7 (65.7)	18.6 (65.5)	16.5 (61.7)	13.2 (55.8)	10.4 (50.7)	8.1 (46.6)	7.7 (45.9)	8.7 (47.7)	10.5 (50.9)	12.6 (54.7)	14.9 (58.8)	16.8 (62.2)	13.1 (55.5)
Mean daily minimum °C (°F)	12.6 (54.7)	12.5 (54.5)	10.3 (50.5)	7.5 (45.5)	5.0 (41.0)	2.9 (37.2)	2.5 (36.5)	3.5 (38.3)	5.2 (41.4)	7.0 (44.6)	9.1 (48.4)	10.9 (51.6)	7.4 (45.3)
Mean minimum °C (°F)	6.5 (43.7)	6.1 (43.0)	3.7 (38.7)	1.1 (34.0)	−1.0 (30.2)	−2.2 (28.0)	−2.5 (27.5)	−1.8 (28.8)	−0.3 (31.5)	1.1 (34.0)	2.7 (36.9)	4.7 (40.5)	−3.0 (26.6)
Record low °C (°F)	2.5 (36.5)	3.4 (38.1)	0.5 (32.9)	−1.5 (29.3)	−3.0 (26.6)	−4.9 (23.2)	−5.2 (22.6)	−3.5 (25.7)	−2.4 (27.7)	−1.4 (29.5)	−2.0 (28.4)	2.0 (35.6)	−5.2 (22.6)
Average rainfall mm (inches)	51.5 (2.03)	35.2 (1.39)	38.8 (1.53)	51.2 (2.02)	63.1 (2.48)	66.9 (2.63)	78.6 (3.09)	83.8 (3.30)	65.6 (2.58)	48.3 (1.90)	52.8 (2.08)	47.6 (1.87)	684.1 (26.93)
Average rainy days (≥ 1 mm)	4.8	4.6	4.4	6.5	7.6	8.3	9.8	10.9	10.0	7.6	7.0	6.0	87.5
Average afternoon relative humidity (%)	48	49	48	56	63	69	69	63	60	53	53	48	57
Average dew point °C (°F)	10.6 (51.1)	11.1 (52.0)	9.2 (48.6)	8.4 (47.1)	7.5 (45.5)	6.4 (43.5)	5.9 (42.6)	5.4 (41.7)	6.0 (42.8)	6.8 (44.2)	8.4 (47.1)	9.1 (48.4)	7.9 (46.2)
Mean monthly sunshine hours	285.2	256.9	241.8	198.0	155.0	135.0	142.6	170.5	201.0	254.2	267.0	282.1	2,589.3
Percentage possible sunshine	62	66	63	60	51	49	48	52	57	62	62	60	59
Source 1: Bureau of Meteorology (1991–2020 averages; extremes 1980–present)
Source 2: Bureau of Meteorology, Launceston Airport (1981–2004 sunshine hours)

Climate data for Launceston Airport (2004–2025)
Month	Jan	Feb	Mar	Apr	May	Jun	Jul	Aug	Sep	Oct	Nov	Dec	Year
Record high °C (°F)	40.4 (104.7)	34.7 (94.5)	34.6 (94.3)	27.6 (81.7)	22.3 (72.1)	17.9 (64.2)	16.8 (62.2)	20.0 (68.0)	23.4 (74.1)	27.4 (81.3)	31.9 (89.4)	35.2 (95.4)	40.4 (104.7)
Mean maximum °C (°F)	33.3 (91.9)	31.2 (88.2)	29.6 (85.3)	23.9 (75.0)	19.4 (66.9)	15.9 (60.6)	15.3 (59.5)	16.9 (62.4)	20.0 (68.0)	23.9 (75.0)	27.8 (82.0)	30.0 (86.0)	33.9 (93.0)
Mean daily maximum °C (°F)	25.2 (77.4)	24.6 (76.3)	22.6 (72.7)	18.3 (64.9)	14.7 (58.5)	12.2 (54.0)	11.8 (53.2)	13.0 (55.4)	15.2 (59.4)	17.6 (63.7)	20.4 (68.7)	22.6 (72.7)	18.2 (64.7)
Daily mean °C (°F)	18.2 (64.8)	17.8 (64.0)	16.1 (61.0)	12.5 (54.5)	9.5 (49.1)	7.4 (45.3)	7.0 (44.6)	8.0 (46.4)	9.7 (49.5)	11.6 (52.9)	14.1 (57.4)	15.9 (60.6)	12.3 (54.2)
Mean daily minimum °C (°F)	11.1 (52.0)	10.9 (51.6)	9.5 (49.1)	6.7 (44.1)	4.3 (39.7)	2.5 (36.5)	2.1 (35.8)	3.0 (37.4)	4.1 (39.4)	5.5 (41.9)	7.7 (45.9)	9.2 (48.6)	6.4 (43.5)
Mean minimum °C (°F)	4.7 (40.5)	4.7 (40.5)	2.9 (37.2)	0.5 (32.9)	−2.0 (28.4)	−3.4 (25.9)	−3.5 (25.7)	−2.4 (27.7)	−1.4 (29.5)	−0.3 (31.5)	1.1 (34.0)	3.1 (37.6)	−4.2 (24.4)
Record low °C (°F)	1.3 (34.3)	2.4 (36.3)	−0.1 (31.8)	−3.3 (26.1)	−4.1 (24.6)	−5.6 (21.9)	−5.4 (22.3)	−3.6 (25.5)	−3.4 (25.9)	−2.7 (27.1)	−1.8 (28.8)	0.8 (33.4)	−5.6 (21.9)
Average rainfall mm (inches)	34.6 (1.36)	29.8 (1.17)	49.3 (1.94)	46.9 (1.85)	52.8 (2.08)	55.5 (2.19)	68.3 (2.69)	76.4 (3.01)	52.8 (2.08)	45.3 (1.78)	52.7 (2.07)	49.2 (1.94)	613.6 (24.16)
Source: Bureau of Meteorology

=== Architecture ===
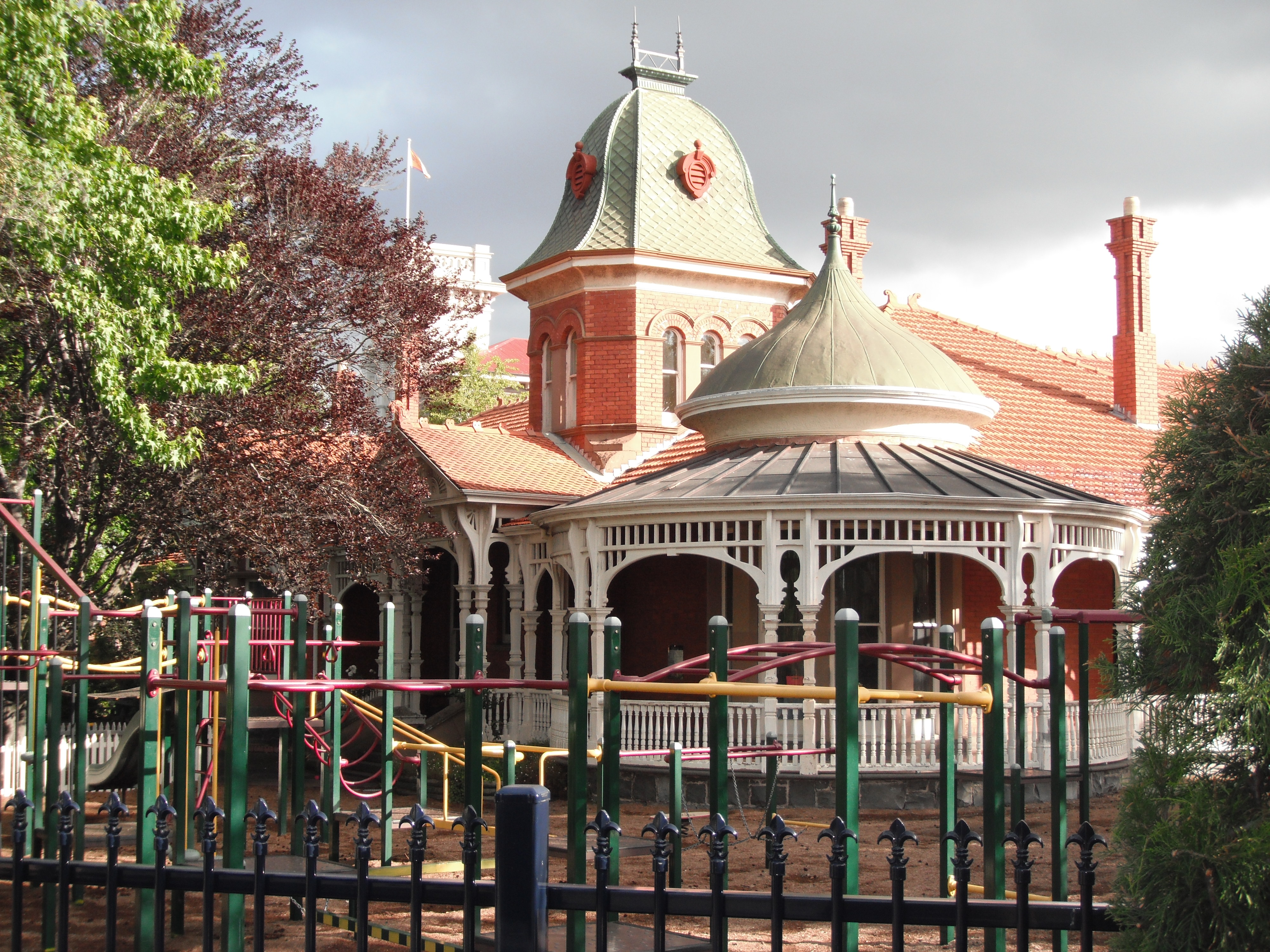
A Federation style house in Newstead

Many of the buildings in the city's central business district (CBD) were constructed in the nineteenth and early twentieth centuries, and Launceston is a major location of Federation style housing. Launceston's has many well preserved Victorian and Georgian buildings, include the Launceston synagogue, a rare example of architecture in Egyptian Revival style.

Launceston's diverse collection of art-deco architecture, such as Holyman House and Lucks Corner in the CBD, the former Star Theatre in Invermay and the former Launceston General Hospital, give the city an unusual period ambience. 20th century examples of architecture that are part of the city include the Government offices of Henty House in Charles Street, the Police Station Building and the ANZ Building on the corner of Brisbane & George Street.

This is at least in part a matter of deliberate policy – concerns that high rise development might compromise the character of the city centre have led to strictly enforced building regulations that restrict the height of new structures in the city, so that most buildings in the CBD have fewer than five storeys.

== Governance ==
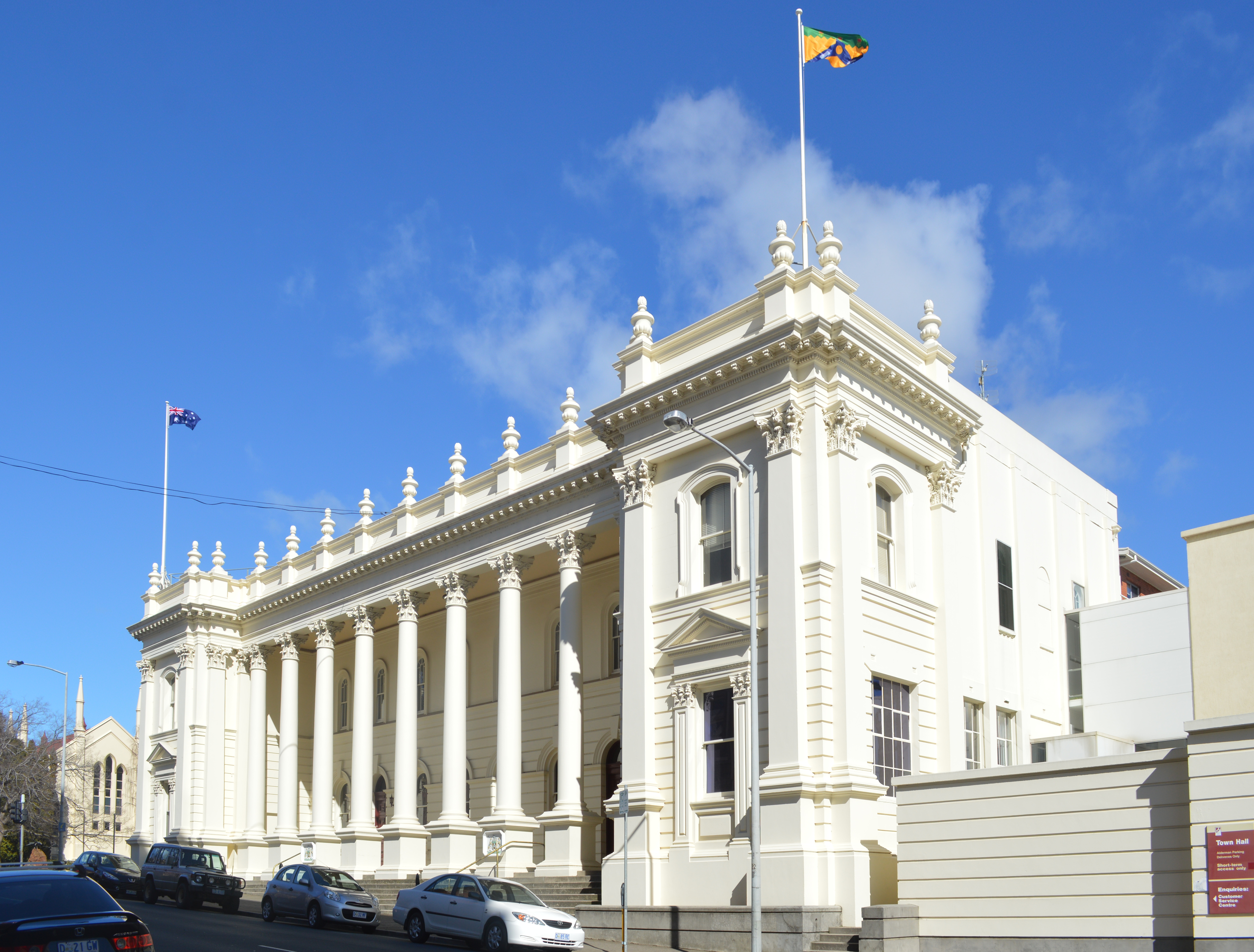
Launceston Town Hall

Local government in Launceston began with the proclamation of Launceston Municipality in 1852. The municipality was proclaimed a Town 1858, then proclaimed a City in 1888. Launceston City absorbed St Leonard’s Municipality in 1985 and Lilydale Municipality in 1987. It absorbed part of Evandale Municipality and part of Westbury Municipality in 1993.

Most of the Launceston urban area is contained within the City of Launceston local government area, although some outer suburbs are part of adjacent council districts: for instance Riverside, Legana and parts of Trevallyn are part of the West Tamar Council; Prospect Vale and Blackstone Heights are included in the Meander Valley Council.

Launceston City Council meetings are held in the Launceston Town Hall. The Mayor of the City of Launceston uses the honorific the Right Worshipful. In 2002, Janie Dickenson became the youngest female elected mayor in Australia. The current mayor is Matthew Garwood, elected in 2023. He was elected via by-election following the previous mayor, Danny Gibson, stepping down from the role due to grooming allegations. The mayor preceding Danny Gibson, Albert Van Zetten, was initially elected in 2007, before being re-elected in 2009, 2011, 2014 and 2018.

State Upper House seats that incorporate parts of Launceston are the Electoral Divisions of Paterson, Windermere and Rosevears. For federal elections, Launceston falls within the Division of Bass, with the sitting member being Jess Teesdale from the Australian Labor Party, who won the seat in the 2025 election. The state Lower House seat is also called the Division of Bass and is one of the five electorates in the Tasmanian House of Assembly. Both federal and state seats share common boundaries.

=== Flag ===
Launceston's flag

The Launceston flag design is based on the city's Coat of Arms granted by the College of Arms, London, on 11 June 1957. The Brisbane Street Mall, the War memorial at Royal Park, atop the Council Chambers and on top of the Albert Hall are places in the city where the flag is regularly flown. Flying the flag is restricted to Council Property.

The three intersecting lines in the flag represent the city's three rivers (North Esk, South Esk and Tamar) and the two rectangles in the lines represent tin ingots. The strip across the top with the jagged edge is green to represent the city's parks, gardens and surrounding countryside. Waratah flowers at the top symbolise all flowers and similar beauties of nature. The ingots are included because Launceston used to be a large tin-smelting centre. The little circle at the river junction is Launceston.

== Economy ==
Along with being a major retail centre with an average of 75% of market share in surrounding local councils, Launceston is a major service centre for the north of Tasmania. The city is home to a campus of the University of Tasmania including the Australian Maritime College and also has a minor minerals and manufacturing base.

Launceston is a major hub for the regional agricultural and pastoral activities. Historically, this has been connected with the growing of apples – in recent years the stress has moved to viticulture. Superfine wool remains an important part of the rural economy of north-east Tasmania and wool sales in Launceston attract many international buyers. The various agricultural industries in the district are supported by the Tasmanian Institute of Agricultural Research which operates the Mount Pleasant Research Laboratories in the Launceston suburb of Prospect.

=== Tourism ===
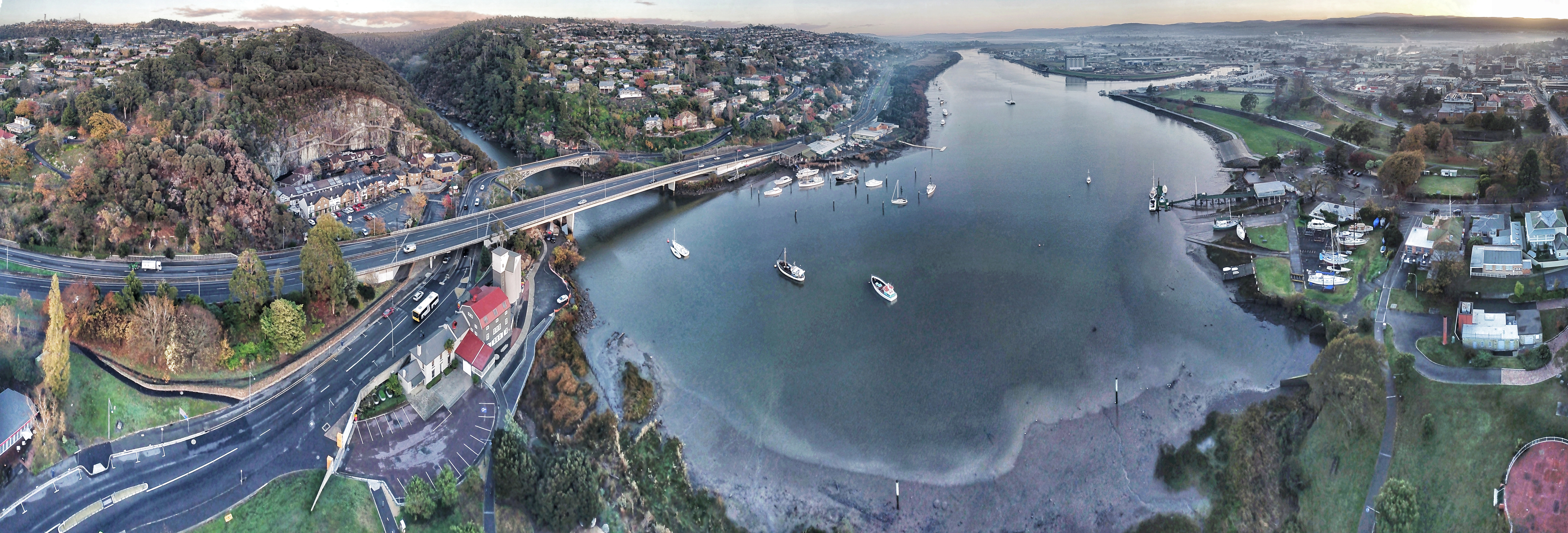
An aerial perspective of Cataract Gorge and its surrounds with the Tamar River

Launceston serves as the commercial hub for the north of Tasmania, and like many parts of the state, is becoming a major tourist centre. Visitors to the city have grown over the past few years: during 2004 Launceston attracted 412,800 visitors, up 51% from 2001. The United Kingdom is the origin of 25% of all international visitors to the city and 17% originate from the United States. The Cataract Gorge is Launceston's largest tourist attraction and is in close proximity to the city centre. It is home to the longest single span chairlift in the world, stretching 308 metres (1,010 ft) across the gorge.

Launceston has many parks throughout the city including City Park, located next to the city centre. City Park is home to Albert Hall. The park also has a large enclosure for Japanese macaque monkeys, a gift from sister city Ikeda, Japan.

The Launceston General Post Office is a heritage-listed building that dates back to the 1880s, with a clock tower added in the early twentieth century. The GPO clock chime chimes every quarter-hour, twenty-four hours a day. Tasmania Zoo, which is known for its wildlife conservation work, including a breeding program for Tasmanian devils, is located near the city.

== Culture ==
=== Arts and entertainment ===
Launceston's Queen Victoria Museum and Art Gallery was established in 1891. Now the largest museum located outside a capital city in Australia, the Queen Victoria Museum and Art Gallery is located at two sites across the city: the original purpose-built building at Royal Park and another at the Inveresk Cultural Precinct, on the grounds of the former railway station and rail yards in buildings largely converted from the former Railway Workshops. The precinct also includes the Launceston Tramway Museum, which houses the No. 29 tram, the 'Mary St' shelter shed and a host of other memorabilia. The state's largest preservation railway, the Don River Railway, also has a carriage rebuilding workshop on the site. Australia's oldest bookshop, A.W. Birchall & Sons (Birchalls) dating from November 1844, was closed in 2017

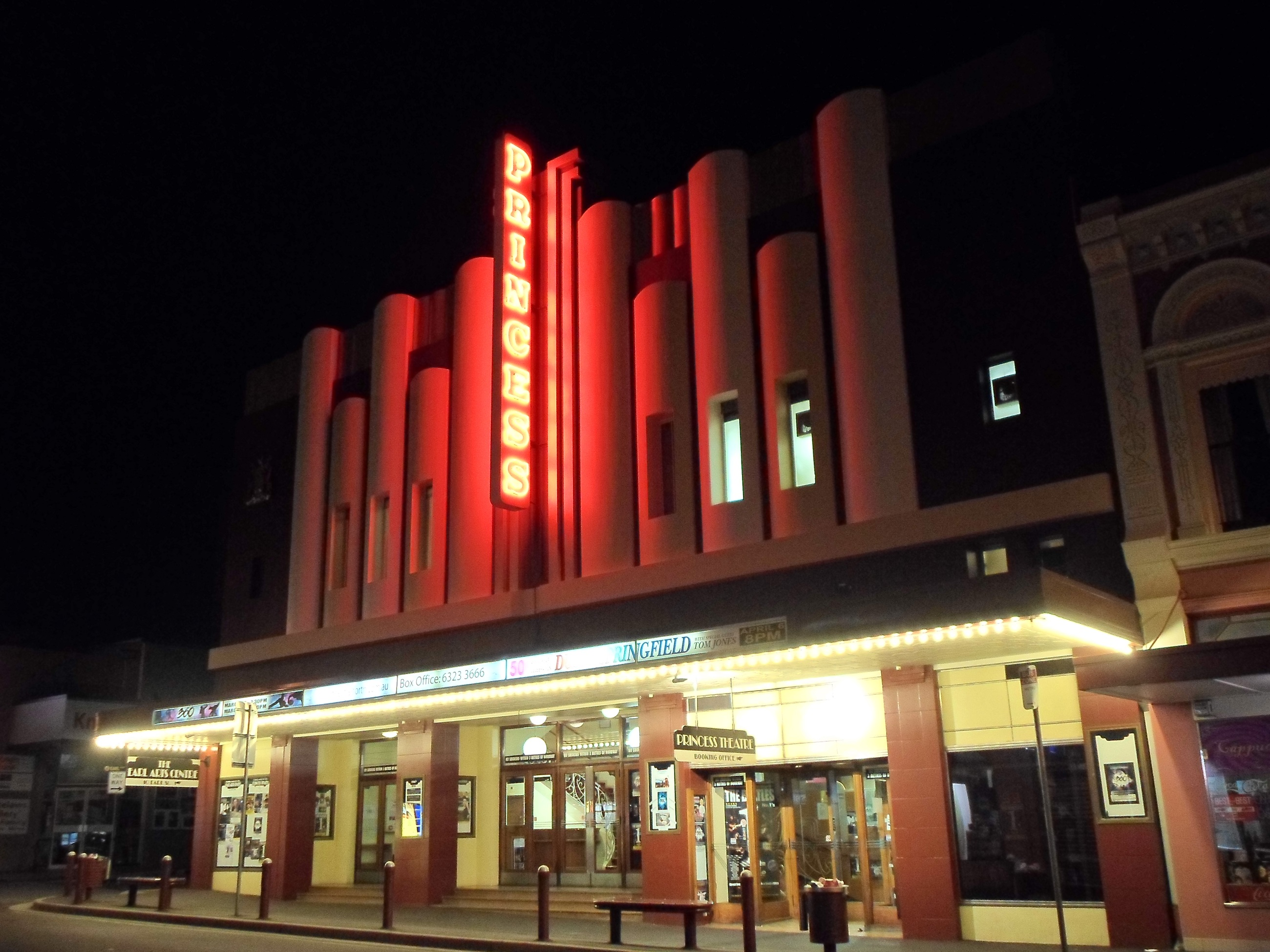
The Princess Theatre

Located in the Southern Launceston suburb of Prospect, the Country Club Casino is a hotel, casino and golf course complex. It was the second casino to be built in Tasmania and one of the first in Australia. The Launceston Leisure and Aquatic Centre, was completed in July 2009 at a cost of a $26.3 million. The facility is located near the central business district, and it spans about 6,450 square metres (69,400 sq ft).

From 1999 to 2003, Launceston was the site of three of the four Gone South music festivals. From 2006 to 2011, it hosted the MS Fest, a music festival held at the Inveresk Show grounds each summer to raise funds for multiple sclerosis research. This has since been replaced with the Breath of Life Festival from 2012 to 2014, a similar event held at the Inveresk show grounds to raise funds for lung cancer research.

Launceston is also the host of the Junction Arts Festival. The Junction Arts Festival was first held in 2010, and spans five days in the Launceston CBD each year. The Festival program changes each year, and includes various art forms, including music, dance, visual and interactive art, short films and live performances, from local, national and international artists.

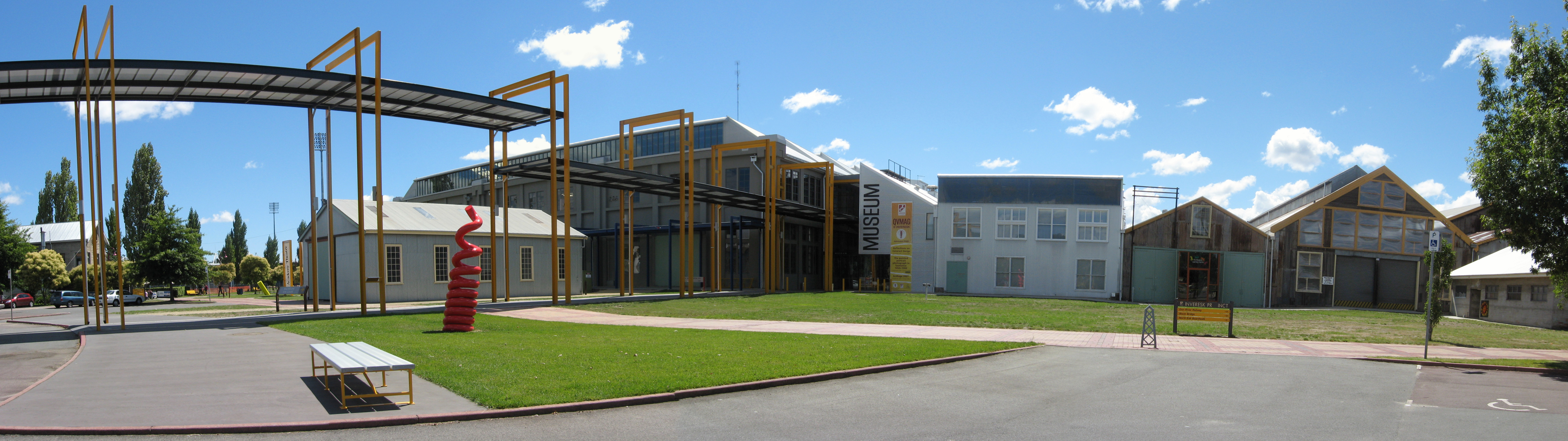
Looking towards the Queen Victoria Museum and Art Gallery

=== Sport ===
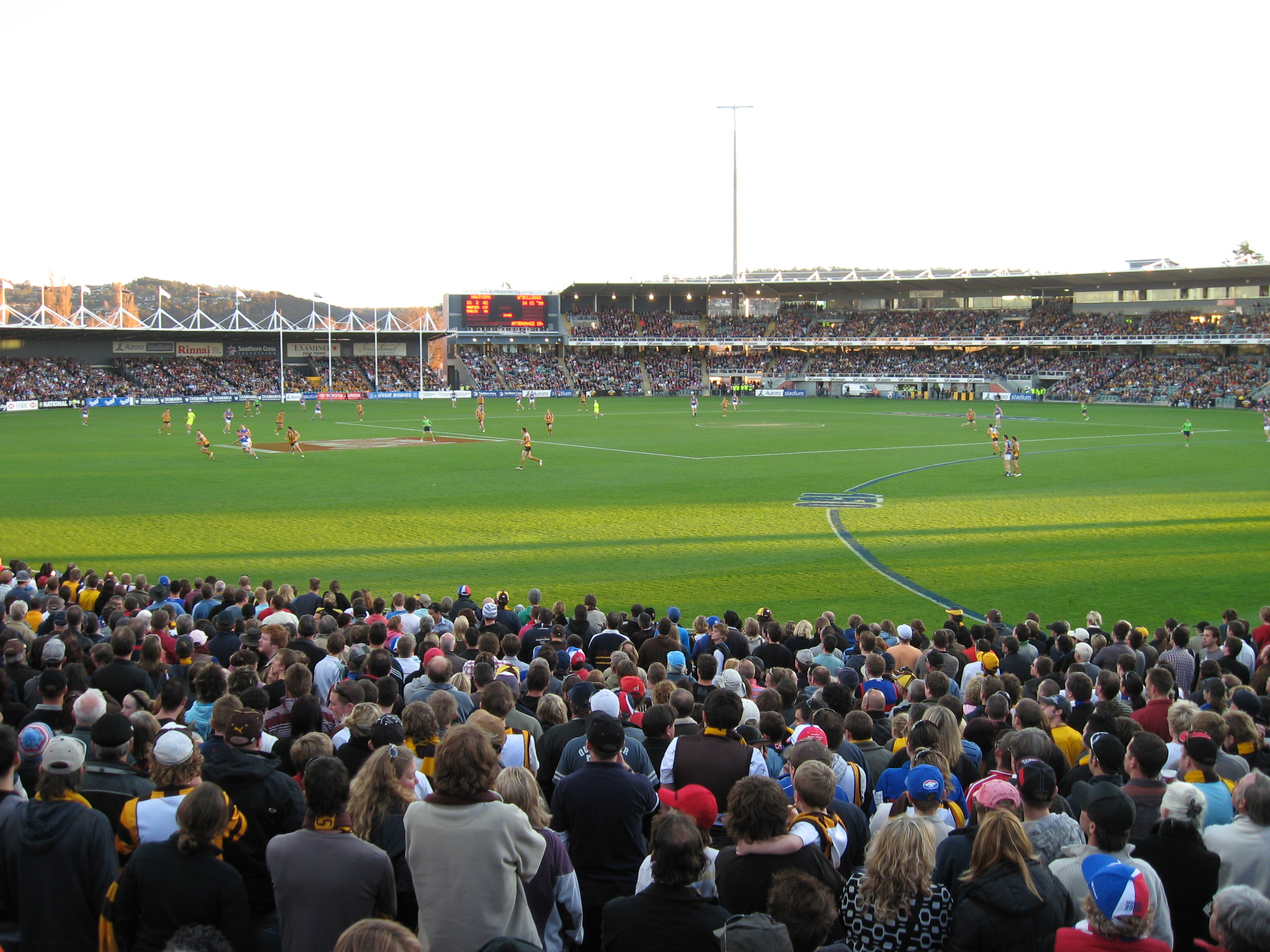
An AFL match at UTAS Stadium

Sport is a popular recreational and spectator activity in Launceston and like most of the state, cricket and Australian rules football are popular sports. Launceston is the birthplace of two prominent Australian cricketers, the former Australian cricket captain Ricky Ponting and the retired cricketer and Australian selector David Boon. It is also the birthplace of Australian cricketer James Faulkner, who along with Ponting and Boon all have the distinction of having been Player of the Match in the Final of the Cricket World Cup. The first first-class cricket match played in Australia was at the Northern Tasmania Cricket Association Ground between the Melbourne Cricket Club and the Launceston Cricket Club in 1851.

Australian rules football is very popular in Launceston, and is often played at York Park (University of Tasmania Stadium). Holding 20,000 people—more than any other stadium in Tasmania—York Park was swampland before becoming Launceston's showgrounds in 1873. Hawthorn has played between two and five AFL matches each season since 2001, and the St Kilda Football Club played two games a year between 2003 and 2006.

In 2007, the Tasmanian Government signed a A$16.4 million, five-year sponsorship deal with the Hawthorn Football Club, under which the club will play four regular season games and one National Australia Bank Cup pre-season match at the venue each year. Throughout its history, York Park has hosted major pop concerts and other entertainments. Since 2001 it has been a venue for international sports events, and in 2005 was redeveloped at a cost of $23.6 million.

Association football (commonly known in Launceston as "soccer") is also played and watched in Launceston [York Park]—the only place in Tasmania to have hosted national league soccer matches. A National Soccer League game was held at Aurora Stadium in 2002 between Perth Glory and Melbourne Knights. A-League's Melbourne Victory have held a pre-season cup game at the venue each year since 2006. The record crowd is 8,061.

Launceston is not represented by an NRL Football Club, but is expected to be represented by an AFL Team by 2028, as Tasmania was awarded the 19th AFL Licence on 2 May 2023 when AFL Presidents Unanimously approved the Tasmanian bid

Rugby league football is played in the region at junior level and senior level, the Launceston Warriors play in the Tasmanian Rugby League and were minor premiers in the 2012–2013 season.

Since 2004, the V8 Supercars (Tasmanian Challenge) has been annually held at the recently re-developed Symmons Plains Raceway, which is around 30 km south of Launceston. Marcos Ambrose, driver of the number 9 Richard Petty Motorsports car is most likely America's most notable Launceston native. A number of other sports have notable presence in Launceston, including basketball (men's, women's and indoor) and hockey. In 2009 Launceston redeveloped the city's swimming facilities which now include a modern indoor multimillion-dollar swimming centre at windmill hill, now named Launceston Leisure and Aquatic Centre.

The city co-hosted the basketball FIBA Oceania Championship 1975, where the Australian national basketball team won the gold medal.

=== Media ===
Launceston's local newspaper The Examiner was founded by James Aikenhead in 1842, and has been continually published ever since. The newspaper is currently owned by Nine Entertainment Co (Nine having merged with Fairfax Media in 2018). Another local media site is The Tasmanian Times.

Along with the rest of the state, the city has four free-to-air television stations, including two government funded channels from the Australian Broadcasting Corporation (ABC), the Special Broadcasting Service (SBS) and two commercial stations; Seven Tasmania (7HD) & WIN (9HD) These services are available in digital format as well as eleven digital-only stations, one carrying Network 10 programming Tasmanian Digital Television (10 HD), and nationwide digital-only stations ABC Family/ABC Kids, ABC Entertains and ABC News (on ABC), SBS2, SBS Food and NITV (on SBS), 7two and 7mate (on Seven), 9Gem, 9Go! and 9Life (on WIN), and 10 Drama, 10 Comedy and Nickelodeon (on TDT).

Radio stations aired around Launceston are: LAFM and Chilli FM – part of the Grant Broadcasters radio network, TOTE Sport Radio – Racing Radio, Triple J – ABC, ABC Northern Tasmania – (ABC), ABC NewsRadio – (ABC), ABC Classic – (ABC), Radio National – (ABC), City Park Radio – Community Radio, SBS Radio – (SBS), Way FM – Christian Radio – LCFM Launceston colleges radio station and 7RPH which is a relay of 864 AM from Hobart.

== Infrastructure ==
=== Health ===
Launceston General Hospital is Launceston's 300-bed public hospital, located just south of the city centre. Every year, LGH treats over 24,000 inpatients and over 225,000 outpatients. St Lukes Private Hospital and St Vincent's Hospital are the major private facilities. Launceston was also the location of the first use of anaesthesia in the Southern Hemisphere. Launceston is the hub for Tasmania's medical retrieval service. The Royal Flying Doctor Service supplies an aircraft and pilots under contract to Tasmania's ambulance service. The aircraft, a Beechcraft Super King Air, is staffed by Ambulance Tasmania's Intensive Care Paramedics and doctors from the Launceston General Hospital.

=== Education ===
- University of Tasmania has its second largest campus in Launceston, based in Newnham. It is currently relocating a significant portion of its campus to Inveresk.
- TasTAFE has two major operations in Launceston based at Alanvale and the Central Business District.

=== Utilities ===
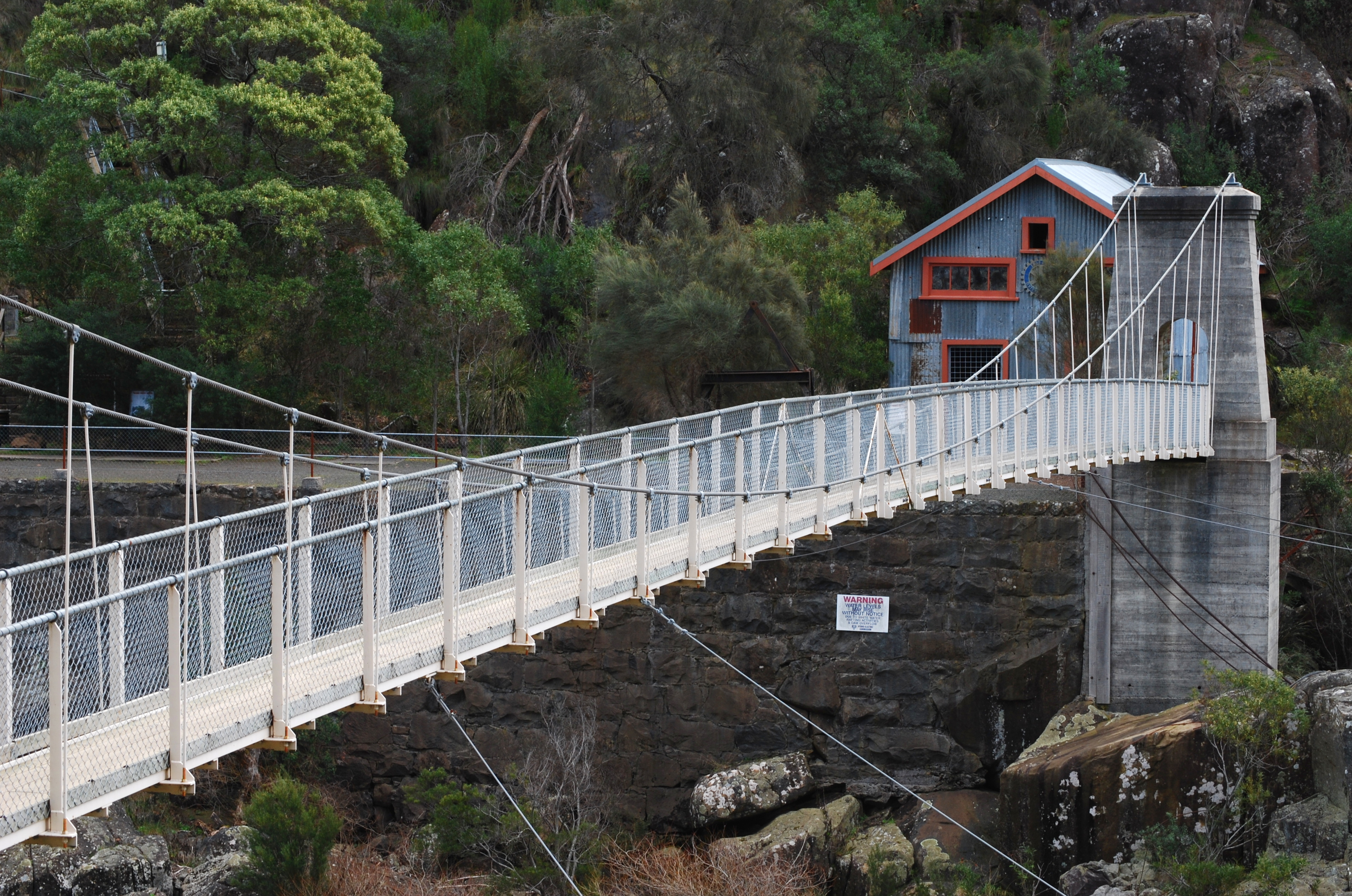
Duck Reach hydro power station, now a museum, once supplied Launceston with the majority of its electricity.

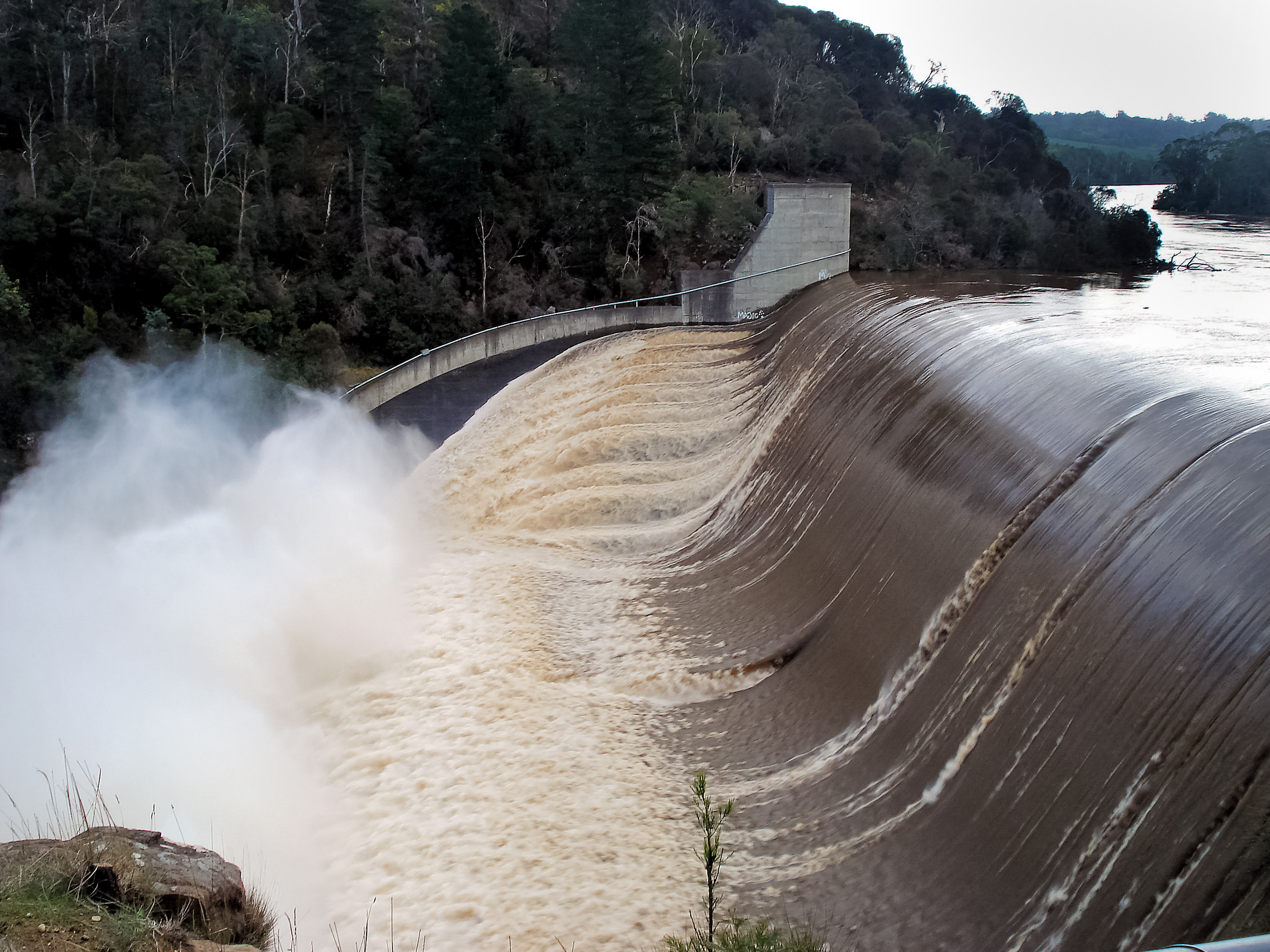
Trevallyn Dam in flood in August 2009

Launceston's electricity is primarily generated by renewable hydro electric power plants including the Trevallyn Power Station which is supplied with water from Trevallyn Dam. The major retailer is Aurora Energy.

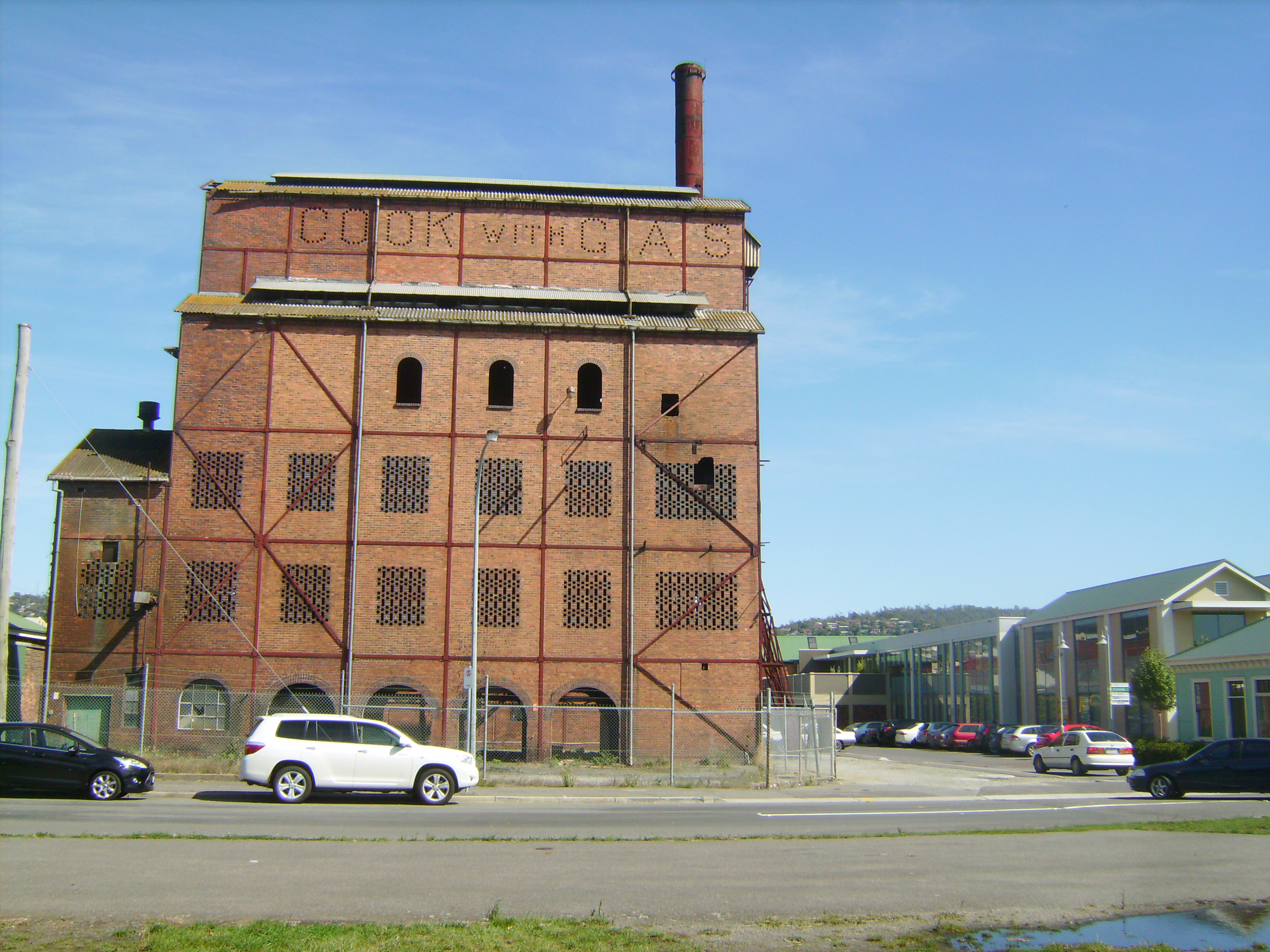
Launceston Gas Company's 1930s vertical retort from the east

Historically, Launceston was powered by gas from the Launceston Gas Company, later Gas Corporation of Tasmania. In 1988 it was sold to Boral. The first gas plant was built in 1860 as a horizontal retort Gas Works house made from brick and sandstone on the site's SW corner. This was followed by keepers cottages, labs, the Headquarters Building and the iconic 1930s vertical retort recognised by the wording "COOK WITH GAS" written in its brickwork.

The Duck Reach Power Station replaced gas for street lighting when it was completed in 1895, the first municipally owned power station in the Southern Hemisphere. Until the 1950s when Trevallyn Power Station was built, Duck Reach supplied Launceston with most of its power needs. It is now an interpretive historic site. The former Gas Works houses the Launceston Hogsbreath Cafe.

Launceston's water comes from the Launceston Water Catchment. The majority is sourced from St Patricks River, a tributary of the North Esk River which flows through Launceston. The main retailer is Ben Lomond Water. The first reticulated water supply constructed in 1857 still serves the CBD. There were fears that the Tamar Valley Pulp Mill might adversely affect Launceston's water supply.

Like many Australian cities, several major companies provide mobile telecommunications services and wireless internet services to Launceston. Launceston's communication infrastructure was upgraded in 1997 through the federal "Networking the Nation" program. Beginning in 2010, the National Broadband Network began installation of fire optic cables in Launceston. In 2016, Launceston became the first city in Tasmania to be fully connected to the NBN.

== Transport ==
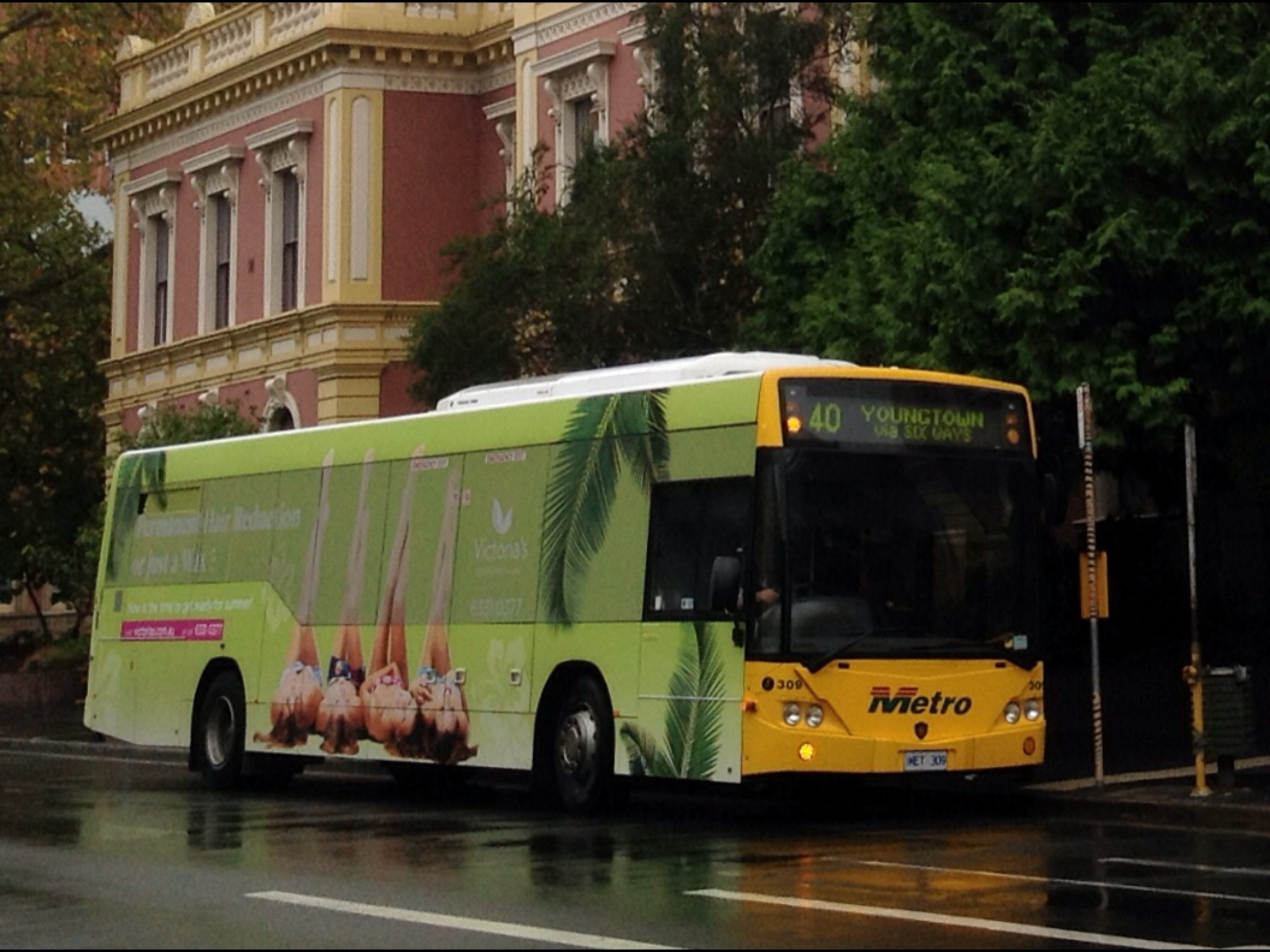
Launceston Metro Tasmania bus on St John Street in 2014

=== Road ===
The car is by far the most dominant form of transport in Launceston, with the city having 721 km of urban and rural roads, even though much of the CBD has narrow one-way streets. One way streets were introduced in Launceston's central business district in May 1974.

In July 1955, Launceston's tram and trolleybus networks were taken over by the Metropolitan Transport Trust. In addition, Kinetic Tasmania offers school services and travels to many destinations across Tasmania.

Because of its central location, Launceston is the hub of five of the state's major highways. The Midland Highway is the primary route to Hobart. The Bass Highway is the primary route to Devonport and Burnie. The Tasman Highway is an alternate scenic route to Hobart via Scottsdale, the East Coast, the West Tamar Highway and East Tamar Highway.

=== Tram and rail network ===
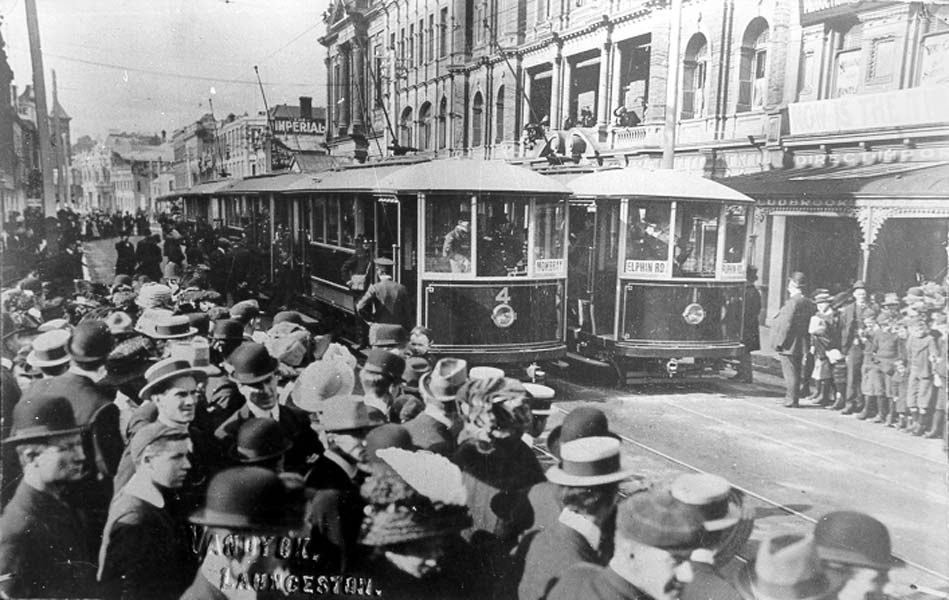
The opening of the Launceston Municipal Tramway in 1911

Launceston operated a suburban tramway system between 1911 and 1952. A decade before the tram system was abandoned, Launceston had begun converting to trolleybuses, especially for the hilly routes. The Launceston trolleybus system ran from 1951 until 1968.

A regional passenger rail system operated in Tasmania, of which Launceston was a major hub. After many years of gradual retrenchment it was closed in July 1978. The Launceston Railway Workshops was the primary servicing centre for the Tasmanian Government Railways diesel locomotive fleet.

Former passenger railway lines servicing Launceston:

- Launceston & Western Railway (1871–1873)
- Launceston–Deloraine (1875–1978)
- Launceston–Hobart (via Evandale) (1876–1978)
- Launceston–Devonport (1885–1978)
- Launceston–Burnie (1901–1978)

The TasRail freight rail system links Launceston to Burnie, Hobart and Bell Bay.

=== Airport ===
The city is served by the small curfew-free Launceston Airport, 15 kilometres (9 mi) south-east of the city. The airport serves over one million passengers annually. Jetstar, QantasLink, Sharp Airlines and Virgin Australia operate scheduled services at the airport. As at November 2020, there are direct flights to and from Adelaide, Brisbane, Melbourne, Perth, and Sydney.

=== Port ===
Launceston's port is located about 48 kilometers north on the Tamar River at Bell Bay. The Port of Bell Bay handles around 5,300,000 tons of domestic and international cargo each year, and has five piers for cruise and passenger ships. The port is adjacent to an industrial park that houses facilities for Temco, Sims Metal, BP and Arrium, among other companies. The Port of Bell Bay is part of a network of ports managed by TasPorts.

== Sister cities ==
Launceston has three sister cities, and one "Friendship city".

City	State	Country	Year
Ikeda	Osaka	Japan	1 November 1965
Napa	California	United States	6 June 1988
Taiyuan	(China) Shanxi	China	28 November 1995
Putian	(China) Fujian	China	2017 (Friendship City)

== Notable people ==
Notable people from or who have lived in Launceston include:

- Nathaniel Atkinson, footballer for Melbourne City F.C.
- Marcos Ambrose, NASCAR driver
- Harold Napier Baker, Rural Dean of St John's Church
- Simon Baker, actor
- George Bailey, cricketer and Australian cricket selector
- Lance Barnard (1919–1997), former Deputy Prime Minister of Australia under Gough Whitlam
- Alfred Beresford (1850–1935), Anglican Archdeacon of Launceston
- David Boon, cricketer
- Harry Cooper, TV veterinarian
- James Faulkner, cricketer
- Sir Wilmot Hudson Fysh, Qantas founder
- Daniel Ganderton, jockey
- Daniel Geale, boxer
- Belle Gibson, scam artist
- Simon Hanselmann, cartoonist
- Hazel Holyman (1899–1992), the first air hostess in Australia
- Simon Hussey, songwriter and record producer
- Tasman Jones, swimmer and diver
- David Lambourne, judge
- Alexander Tasman Marshall, Tasmanian MHA
- Ray Martin, journalist
- Cleo Massey, actress
- Stewart McSweyn, distance runner
- Ricky Ponting, cricketer
- Richie Porte, professional cyclist
- Bec Rawlings, boxer
- Peter Sculthorpe, composer
- Hattie Shepparde (1846–1874), actress and opera singer
- Rachael Taylor, actress
- Ariarne Titmus, Olympic champion swimmer
- Frank Lee Woodward (1871–1952), Pali scholar, author and theosophist
- John Youl, an early clergyman, St John's Church of England
- Shane Yost, Championship Vert Skater
- Fiora Cutler, Musician
