= General Post Office, Launceston =

Heritage-listed building in Tasmania

Launceston Post Office
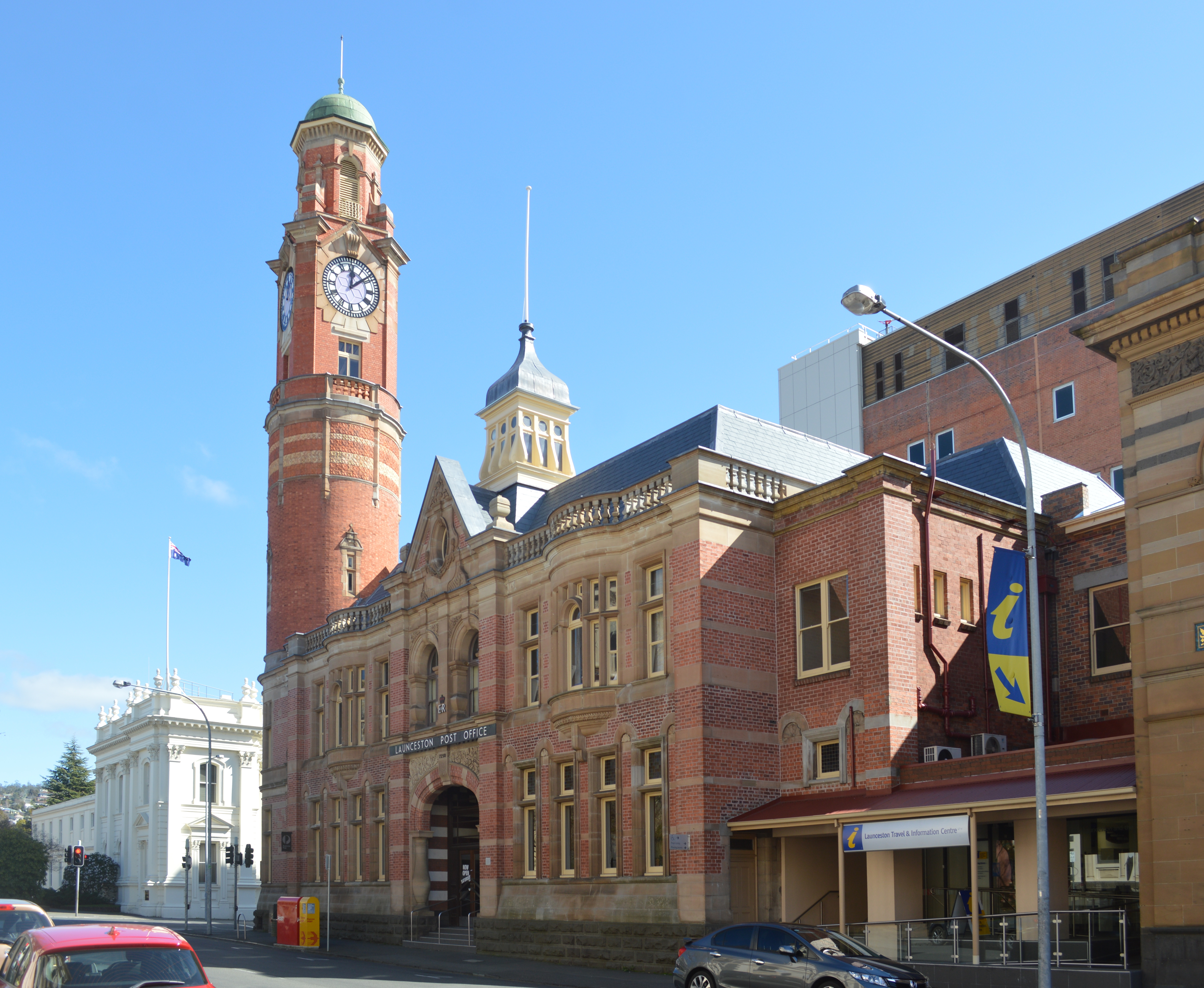

- Location within Tasmania
- 41.4353°S 147.1377°E
- Location: 68-72 Cameron Street, Launceston, Tasmania, Australia

Commonwealth Heritage List
- Official name: Launceston Post Office
- Type: Listed place (Historic)
- Designated: 22 June 2004
- Reference no.: 105210

Launceston Post Office is a heritage-listed post office at 68-72 Cameron Street, Launceston, Tasmania, Australia. It was designed by William Waters Eldridge, with alterations prior to opening designed by Corrie and North. It opened in 1891, while the clock tower was completed in 1903 and altered in 1910. It was added to the Australian Commonwealth Heritage List on 22 June 2004.

== History ==
Launceston gained its first overland mail service from Hobart in 1816, a decade after the city was established in 1806. It is claimed that this was the first overland mail delivery service in Australia. From at least the 1820s, a private house post office service was operated. In 1856, a telegraph service was established and the first mail train services, to and from Hobart, commenced in 1877.

Located on the northeast corner of the intersection of Cameron and St John Streets, Launceston Post Office was built on the former site of the Royal Olympic Theatre, which was part of the London Tavern. Prior to this, the post office operated from at least four positions. In the 1820s, the first recorded postmaster, Arundel Wright, conducted business from the corner of York and St John Streets, possibly from Crabtree Corner. In the 1830s, the post office relocated to a cottage on the corner of Paterson and St John Streets, now the site of the Union Bank Building. Between 1839 and 1859, it operated at 27/53 George Street, also mooted to be the site of the first telegraph office. From 1859 to 1889, it operated out of the Government Offices on St John Street opposite.

Launceston Post Office was designed by the Tasmanian Government Architect William Waters Eldridge who had inspected the site in January 1885. Eldridge had recently completed a design for the Hobart Supreme Court buildings (1884–87) and his working drawings for the Launceston Post and Telegraph Office are dated 8 July 1885. On 23 November 1885, the building contract was awarded to James Hill (or Hills?). On 24 March 1887, the contract was transferred to John and Thomas Gunn who completed most of the construction by 1889. The design of the corner turret as a low conical spire was not well received by the public, and various modifications were put forward. In February 1890, a design by architects Corrie & North for a taller cylindrical tower topped by an octagonal pointed roof was accepted. On 22 December 1890 the telegraph office was opened and in January 1891, postal services were transferred from the government offices and the building opened.

When opened, the building was not well received by the local community; the bold external patterning and colour was considered controversial, as was the interior arrangement of the mailroom and quadrangle. Some asserted the design to be "the last and grossest insult to the people of Launceston" and called for its demolition. Further, by error, the tower was constructed without provision for a clock as originally intended.

The matter of the clock resurfaced during the city's 1906 centenary celebrations and the Launceston Clock and Chimes Committee was formed to initiate a public subscription push to fund its installation. The committee raised an estimated £1,339 for the purpose, but also used the opportunity to redress the presentation of the upper tower by replacing the top section with a taller design. In January 1908, Inspector-General Colonel Percy Owen the Commonwealth Department of Home Affairs Works Division, which had taken over responsibility for post office design following the passage of the Commonwealth Post and Telegraph Act in 1902, presented two bell tower options to the committee. Their preferred design was selected and an order placed with Gillett and Johnston of Croydon of Surrey, England for the clock and bells. The design for the Edwardian Baroque tower top, with clocks in all 4 faces, was by Hedley Westbrook, possibly under the supervision of the Commonwealth Senior Architect John Smith Murdoch, and working drawings were prepared by May 1908. The clock and bells were installed in October 1909 and the tower completed in 1910. At some point the John Street frontage was also modified by extending the first floor to the street, eliminating a porch, with a simple design much less strident than the original treatment.

The committee handed the clock and chimes over to the City Council on 11 July 1910. Australia Post took over this responsibility on 27 June 1949. In February 1969, the clock and chimes were powered electrically.

A telephone room was provided in 1918, and repairs to the roof lantern were undertaken in 1930. The post office underwent extensive internal alterations in 1933 to expand the functional space for mail sorting and counter space, including the former newspaper room and postmaster's office into the mailroom and annexing part of the quadrangle, alterations to the St John Street entrance to provide access to telephone and private boxes, remodelling of the ground floor rooms on the east and west sides of the quadrangle, infilling the cartway openings on the north boundary and refurbishing the area for office accommodation, converting the first floor rooms overlooking Cameron Street into a single space, and other alterations. Around 1935, the balcony to St John Street was infilled to enlarge the first floor area and the public entrance was widened.

In 1976-79 conservation works were undertaken to the tower to address fretting stonework, weathered pointing and extensive staining due to rusting of the ironwork around the clock faces. Replacement stone was obtained from the original quarry at Tea Tree near Hobart. In 1978–79, interior refurbishment works took place, including the modernisation of the counter and the replacement of lighting and heating. Conservation works to the exterior streetscape facades took place in 1983, and remedial works to control the rusting of the steel beams of the tower and bell room.

In 1998, the interior was substantially remodelled and altered for commercial tenant use. Ground floor works included the removal of perimeter timber veneered infill panel walls to the quadrangle, partitions and non-original ceiling linings to the former mailroom, placement of counter joinery and structural concrete lintel over the existing north wall. New plasterboard ceilings and steel-framed plasterboard partition walls were installed to subdivide the former mailroom into a training meeting room and kitchen, as well as to enlarge the (by then) limited rear sorting area associated with the Australia Post occupancy. A new opening and roller door was installed to the Australia Post retail shop. New stud walls were installed around the quadrangle perimeter and "display niches" placed in the north wall. Other works included the installation of a lift shaft, reconfiguration of the toilet areas located along the southwest wing and new glazed office partitions. Similar works were undertaken to the first floor involving the installation of office partitions and ceilings, refurbishment of the toilets and the subdivision of the atrium over the former mailroom for office use.

== Description ==
Launceston Post Office is at 68–72 Cameron Street, corner St John Street, Launceston. It is a Federation Free Style prototype, fusing Queen Anne and Free Romanesque details, with a clock tower completed in later stages (1908–10) into the Edwardian Baroque era.

Launceston Post Office, completed in 1889, with the subsequent addition to the corner tower in 1903, and its replacement clock and bell tower in 1910, is located on the northeast corner of Cameron and St John Streets. The tower is a dominant built element in the surrounding precinct and marks the historical centre of town incorporating the government offices, Town Hall service centre and State Library opposite. The nine level brick former Telecom exchange building, probably built in the 1960s, overshadows the post office's western elevation to St John Street. At the rear of the site, further to the northeast, is the former Launceston Workshops, built in the 1930s and with frontage to Cimitiere Street. A ramped concreted driveway on its west side provides car access up to that building and extends further south to provide rear vehicular access to both the exchange and post office.

In general terms, the corner tower, as completed to c. 1903, comprised a cylindrical redbrick drum with dressed stone bandings and an arcade of round-arched windows with thick architraves that in general appearance acknowledges the Free Romanesque. Above this was a conical roof in general alignment with the early French Renaissance or "Francois Premier", a reference that was, at the time, running within both Free Romanesque and Queen Anne circles.

As extended in 1910, the conical roof was removed and the tower elongated above the level of the circular drum in a rectilinear shape, with no banding, surmounted at the top by a drum and hemispherical cupola. The walls either side of the four clock faces are set diagonally and dramatised by extended cornices and consoles immediately above. The polygonal drum contains four arched panels over each clock, which are further amplified by a splayed voussoir stone surround, a common treatment for bullseye windows in the Edwardian Baroque high tide. In each case, the voussoirs form a lintel for windows immediately below and are capped with a shallow moulding at the top, to form a pediment of sorts, plasticised at the centre with a large scrolled keystone.

The tower is flanked by two-storey brickwork walls constructed in tuck-pointed red face brick set on a coarsely rusticated bluestone plinth. Both elevations are decorated and enriched by freestone mullions, window settings, stringcourses, balustraded parapets, carved pediments and entablature. The treatment extends to the interior double-height arcaded walls of the quadrangle, which is surmounted by domed lantern.

The Cameron Street elevation (south) is break-fronted and framed by two piers, with a large flattened arch with accentuated voussoirs and keystone leading to the entry vestibule. The keystone is linked to a central pier that drives up through a richly carved entablature (with building inscription) above the arch. It bisects two arched windows on the first floor, each with similarly accentuated keystones. At the top, a triangular pediment between two solid flanking piers surmounts the central bay featuring an oval window with consoles in dressed sandstone. Behind this is a prominent roof lantern. Two identical bays flank the central pedimented entry. The ground floor windows are subdivided in a 2:1 ratio between the main and top lights, and separated by piers with rounded stone caps and miniature stone arches. This motif, translated more generally into brick, appeared in various forms throughout Australia's Federation period. At the first floor level similar windows flank either side of a "blistered" 6-faceted oriel bay window, with the central two windows joined by a miniature stone arch.

The St John Street (west) elevation has similar bluestone, brickwork and stone detailing, although the dressed stone banding of the ground floor is augmented by an irregular staggered pattern. Originally, a centrally-positioned triangular pediment (similar to the Cameron Street entry) featured on this elevation but has been subsequently concealed by the balcony roof additions. Windows have a similar 2:1 division as those facing Cameron Street, but are divided with thick, flat-fronted crossbars. The northernmost bay is setback, marking the former entry to the cartway, and decorated by a stone pediment, strapwork and a bracketed balcony. Behind this is a prominent roof lantern.

=== Condition and integrity ===
Externally, despite phased alteration and addition, Launceston Post Office's ability to externally demonstrate its original architectural conception is exceptionally good, as completed in 1889 and the completion of the tower in 1910. With reference to the contract drawings dated 1885, the principal alterations are the addition of balcony infill to the St Johns Street elevation (which conceals the original pediment behind the roof), the construction of the two-storey post office box lobby along the east building boundary; infill to the large arched cartway openings to the north wall and removal of the rear verandah; relining of the slate roof with corrugated iron and removal of the roof vein decoration. Nonetheless, when viewed from the surrounding streetscapes, the existing building asserts a clear sense of its totality as a civic building in aesthetic terms.

== Heritage listing ==
Launceston Post Office, dating from 1889, is historically highly significant. Built as the main post office for Launceston, it has fulfilled this role over a lengthy period, being the central point in the city for a wide range of services which have evolved over the decades. Following Federation, postal services were taken over by the Commonwealth, and post offices were one representation to the general public of the new federal system of government. The GPO has a long and strong association with the development of Launceston and particularly the central business district. The building reflects postal hall planning of the period and later by centralising the public in an atrium surrounded by public servants and departs both conceptually and formally from the more typical public hall and counter convention. Stylistically, the quadrangle demonstrates a sense of purposeful planning which is rare, if not unique, in the national context. Typologically, Launceston Post Office housed distinct post and telegraph functions within one large structure. The GPO is important architecturally in being a very early and fine example of Federation Queen Anne style. The building's use of red brick and freestone, impressive street facades, internal quadrangle with galleries, decorative stone carving, fine leadlight work, pediments, corner tower, cupolas and a wide range of other decorative features all contribute to its significance. The building is Tasmania's most imposing and architecturally advanced post office of the nineteenth century. Prominently positioned on a major street corner in the centre of the city, the GPO with its distinctive tower and fine facades to Cameron and St John Streets, is one of the most readily identifiable landmarks in Launceston. The building is important as an example of the work of Tasmanian Government Architect W Eldridge. The GPO is of social significance to the community due to the building having been a focus for a large part of Launceston's population over a lengthy period.

The curtilage includes the title block/allotment of the property.

The significant components of Launceston Post Office include the main 1885-89 postal building and later clock tower of 1903 and 1908–10. The balcony infill at first floor level to the St John Street elevation is of contributory significance. Elements which are not of significance include the infill to the arched cartway openings to the north wall, and the two-storey east wing addition and verandah to Cameron Street.

Launceston Post Office was listed on the Australian Commonwealth Heritage List on 22 June 2004 having satisfied the following criteria.

Criterion A: Processes

Launceston Post Office, dating from 1889, forms an important part of the city's central civic and administrative precinct, playing a critical role since the opening of the telegraph office in December 1890 followed by the post office opening in January 1891. Built as the main post office for Launceston, it has fulfilled this role over a lengthy period, being the central point in the city for a wide range of services which have evolved over the decades. In scale and architectural achievement, the post office embodies a prosperity and future confidence in Launceston that stemmed in large part from Tasmania's mineral boom of the late nineteenth century, and it begins Tasmania's crucial role in development of Federation architecture. Following Federation, postal services were taken over by the Commonwealth, and post offices were one representation to the general public of the new federal system of government. The GPO has a long and strong association with the development of Launceston and particularly the central business district.

The significant components of Launceston Post Office include the main 1885-89 postal building and later clock tower of 1903 and 1908–10. The balcony infill at first floor level to the St John Street elevation is of contributory significance.

Criterion B: Rarity

Launceston Post Office's internal quadrangle was originally conceived as a courtyard through which the public moved to various counters and rooms including "stamps", "enquiry", "registered letters" and "night delivery" counters (north wall), money order and savings bank (west wall), and letters carrier room (east wall); the space retains a high level of aesthetic integrity including its "blood and bandage" walls, upper gallery, the large stone-framed stained glass window (north) and roof lantern. Even accepting changes to the original circulation (to both counters-in-the-round and the removal of stairs to the upper gallery) and the refurbishment of the building perimeter areas as tenanted offices, stylistically, the quadrangle demonstrates a sense of purposeful planning which is rare, if not unique, in the national context.

This planning arrangement - centralising the public in an atrium surrounded by public servants - departs both conceptually and formally from the more typical public hall and counter convention.

Criterion D: Characteristic values

Launceston Post Office is an example of:

1. Second generation post office (second generation typology 1870-1929) with combined telegraph office (subsequently removed)
2. Federation Free Style prototype, fusing Queen Anne and Free Romanesque details
3. Colonial and Commonwealth government architects.

Typologically, Launceston Post Office housed distinct post and telegraph functions within the one large structure.

The centralisation of the public quadrangle around which all transactions were carried out at counters to separate departments located around the perimeter and in distinct offices makes it different from other design.

Stylistically and architecturally, Launceston Post Office is a seminal public building in the Federation mode, possibly the first clear example in Australia given its documentation around 1885. It combines a range of late nineteenth century Free Style approaches: Queen Anne, Free Romanesque and American; in addition to elements of High Victorianism recast in a more arts and crafts mould. It demonstrates a range of stylistic details which are associated with Alexander North, the leading Tasmanian architect of the time and a significant architect in Australian history.

The building's use of red brick and freestone, impressive street facades, internal quadrangle with galleries, decorative stone carving, fine leadlight work, pediments, corner tower, cupolas and a wide range of other decorative features all contribute to its significance. The building is Tasmania's most imposing and architecturally advanced post office of the nineteenth century.

Criterion E: Aesthetic characteristics

Launceston Post Office is an excellent large-scale stone and brick decorated public building in the Federation Free Style mode. Prominently positioned on a major street corner in the central Launceston civic precinct, the GPO with its distinctive tower and fine facades to Cameron and St John Street is a widely known landmark in Launceston.

Criterion F: Technical achievement

Launceston Post Office is a seminal public building in a Federation mode, possibly the first clear example in Australia given its documentation around 1885. It combines a range of late nineteenth century Free Style approaches: Queen Anne, Free Romanesque and American; in addition to elements of High Victorianism recast in a more Arts and Crafts mould and skilfully deployed and richly composed. The expression of the clock bell tower is unique given its staged construction and revised input by potentially three principal architects over an approximate 20-year period. The use of Tea Tree sandstone, and in particular the extensive carved ornamentation, are representative of the highest standards of workmanship and contribute towards an aesthetic "totality", despite alterations to the St John Street (west) elevation. The internal quadrangle, while altered, also compares favourably with those included in general postal halls nationally, including Melbourne, Hobart and Adelaide GPOs.

Criterion G: Social value

Australia Post has had a presence on the site for almost 120 years, providing postal services to a large portion of the general and business community. The importance of the building to the local community is reflected in the active objections to the initial corner tower design, and in the initiative to form a committee to raise funds by public subscription for the clock and bells. Ultimately the equipment was installed in 1910, in an amended design for the corner tower selected by the committee, representing the end of the building's completion. In contrast to other postal designs of this period, Launceston Post Office never had an external public loggia or arcade for social meeting, the internal public quadrangle designed to supplant this function.

Launceston Post Office is of social significance to the community having been a focal point for a large part of Launceston's population over a lengthy period.

Criterion H: Significant people

Launceston Post Office is important for the associations with architects W. Eldridge and Hedley Westbrook, and the involvement of Alexander North.

The latter has been counted among the best architects active in Australia at that time, who left a considerable legacy in his general effect on Free Style architecture in Australia, and in the work of his Tasmanian protege and sometime partner Louis Williams.
