= Daniel Ganderton =

Australian jockey

Personal information
- Born: 24 October 1988 (age 37) Launceston, Tasmania, Australia
- Occupation: Jockey

Horse racing career
- Sport: Horse racing
- Career wins: (ongoing)

Major racing wins
- Queensland Cup (2009)

Racing awards
- Sydney Leading Apprentice (2008–2009)

Significant horses
- Battlefield; Cape Breton

Daniel Ganderton (born 24 October 1988 in Launceston, Tasmania) is a Thoroughbred horse racing jockey.

Ganderton hails from a racing family and initially raced for his uncle's stable in Spreyton, Tasmania. He began his racing career in 2005 and quickly established himself as Tasmania's leading apprentice. In February 2008, he joined Gai Waterhouse's stables as an apprentice and secured the title of Sydney's leading apprentice for the 2008/2009 season.

Among his many victories to date, Ganderton has won the Queensland Cup, riding Cape Breton.

== Personal life ==
Ganderton attended Hagley Farm Primary School in Tasmania, and high school at St Patrick's College, Launceston. In his spare time he enjoys playing football where he played at Launceston City, and represented Northern Tasmania squads in football before becoming a professional jockey.
