= Inveresk & York Park Precinct =

Inveresk and York Park Precinct
- Suburb
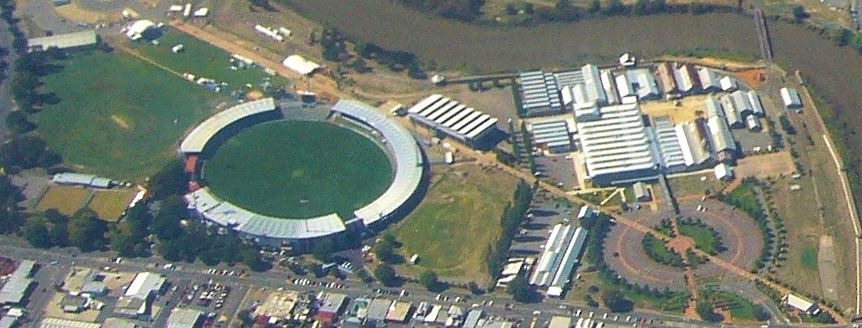
- View of Inveresk and York Park Precinct

- Coordinates: 41°25′33″S 147°08′20″E
- Country: Australia
- State: Tasmania
- City: Launceston
- LGA: City of Launceston
- Postcode: 7250

The Inveresk and York Park Precinct in Launceston, Tasmania, once Tasmania's largest industrial site, is now the major cultural heart of the town. It is home to York Park, one of two current Australian Football League venues in Tasmania, the Queen Victoria Museum and Art Gallery, TAFE Tasmania, and The School of Visual and Performing Arts. The annual Royal Launceston Show is held every October at the Inveresk Showgrounds. Invermay Park and other minor facilities are located behind York Park and near to the Inveresk Showgrounds. The precinct is also home to the Annexe Theatre, one of Tasmania's leading venues and home of CentrStage Theatre.

York Park is a sports ground located in the Inveresk and York Park Precinct, Launceston, Australia, and is the largest capacity stadium in Tasmania, holding 21,000. From 2004 to 2016, it was known as Aurora Stadium, under a naming-rights sponsorship deal with Aurora Energy. Late 2016, the naming rights were picked up by University of Tasmania. Primarily used for Australian rules football, its record attendance was 20,971, when Hawthorn played Richmond in an AFL match in June 2006.

== York Park ==
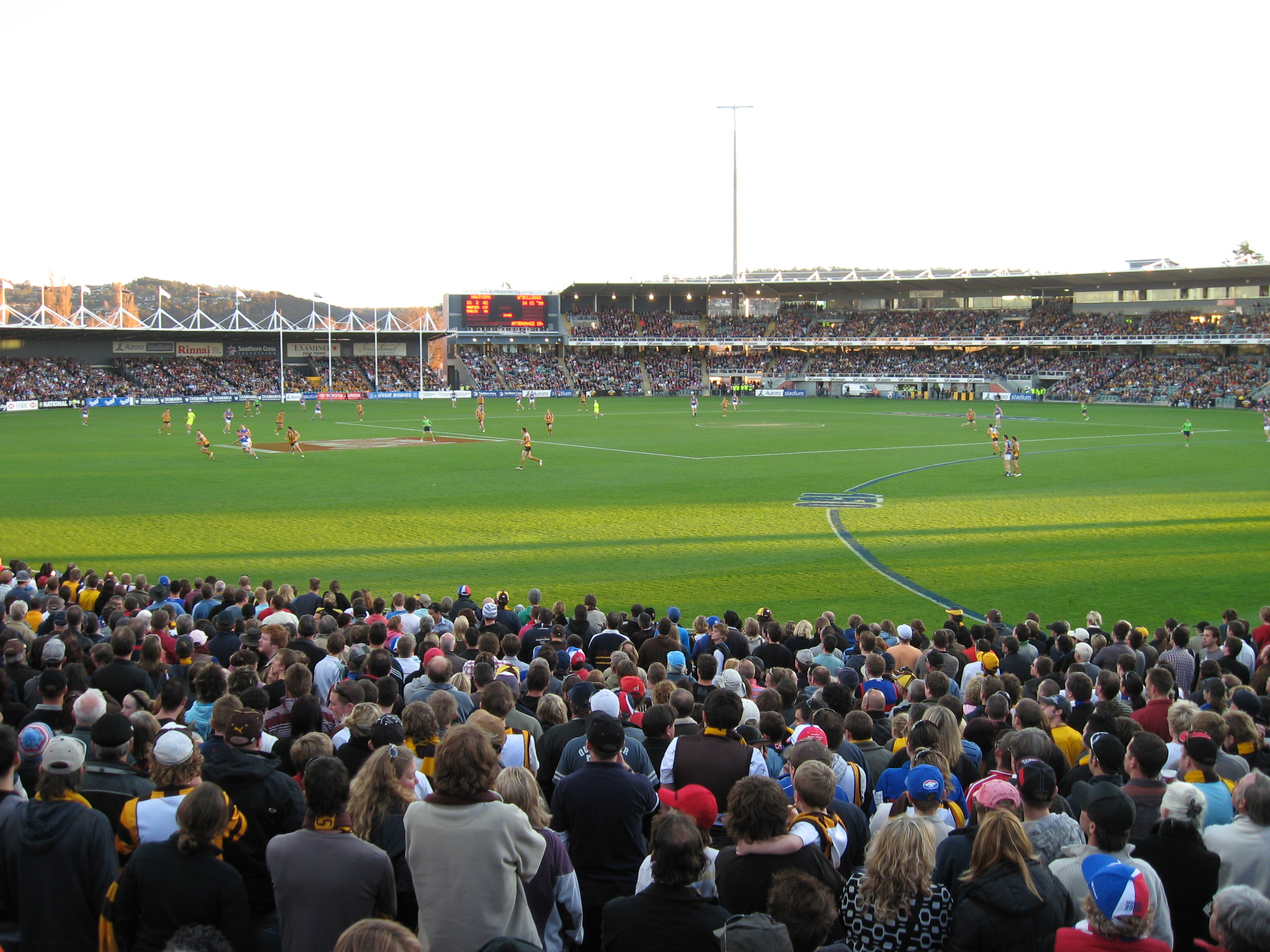
An AFL match at Aurora Stadium

York Park is a sports ground located in the Inveresk and York Park Precinct, Launceston, Australia. It has the highest capacity of any stadium in Tasmania, holding 20,000. Between 2004 and 2016, it was known as Aurora Stadium under a naming rights agreement with Aurora Energy. Primarily used for Australian rules football, its record attendance, 20,971, was set in June 2006 when Hawthorn played Richmond in an Australian Football League (AFL) match in June 2006.

York Park has been used as an international sports venue since 2001. Beforehand, only North Launceston and state football games were played. The area was originally swampland before becoming Launceston's showgrounds in 1873. Work started on transforming the area into a sports venue in 1919 and was completed within two years.

Australian rules football has been played at York Park since 1923, with other sports such as cricket, tennis, bowling, cycling and foot-racing also staged. Since 2001, the Hawthorn Football Club has played between two and five AFL matches a year at the ground, and the St Kilda Football Club played two games a year from 2003 to 2006. The Tasmanian Government has a A$16.4-million, five-year sponsorship deal with Hawthorn, meaning that four home and away season games and one National Australia Bank Cup pre-season match will be played at the venue each year. On 21 February 2009 the ground became home of the Tasmanian Football Hall of Fame. Throughout its history, York Park has hosted major pop concerts and other entertainments. A redevelopment at a cost of $23.6 million was completed in 2005.

== Queen Victoria Museum and Art Gallery ==
The Queen Victoria Museum and Art Gallery (QVMAG) has a part of the museum located at the Inveresk Precinct. Its other site is at Royal Park and when combined it becomes the largest museum in Australia located out of a capital city. It includes a working planetarium and displays related to Launceston's industrial environments and railway workshops.

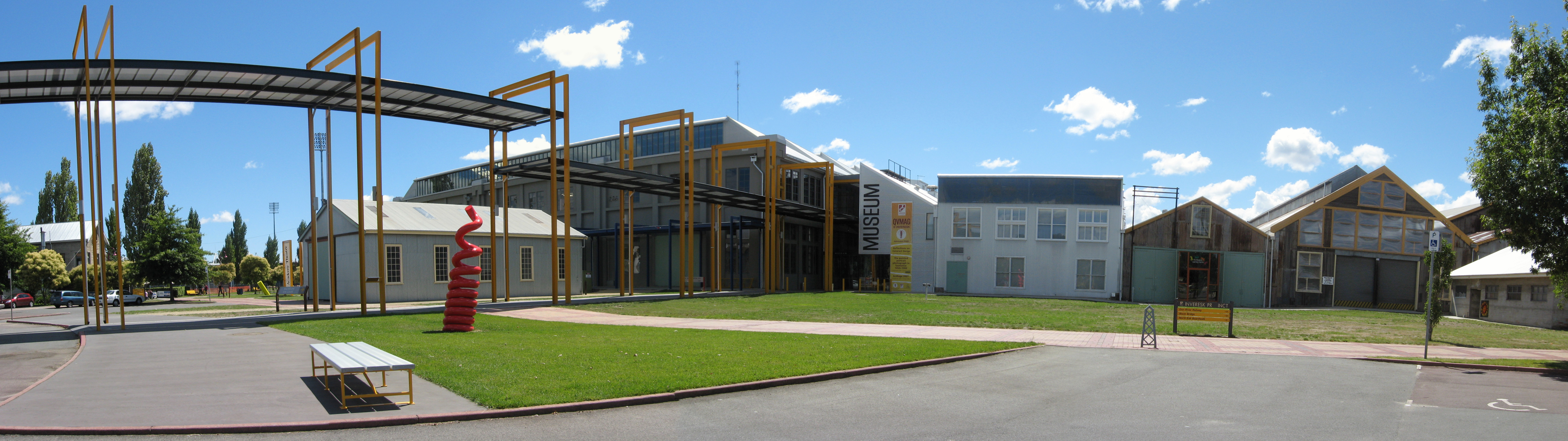
Looking towards the Queen Victoria Museum and Art Gallery

== Inveresk Showgrounds ==
Every October the Royal Launceston Show is held at the Inveresk Showgrounds. The show runs for three days, starting on a Thursday (Which is a public holiday in Northern Tasmania) and ending on Sunday. The Royal Launceston Show is principally an agricultural event which focuses on the primary industries of Tasmania, and rural lifestyle of many Tasmanians with events such as livestock judging, equestrian events, animal breeders competitions, produce competitions and wood chopping, although it also incorporates live entertainment, sporting events, food tasting, and fashion shows. A popular feature of the show is the sideshows which feature showrides, foodstalls, games of skill, and showbag stalls.

MS Fest was a single day music festival held beside York Park annually between 2006 - 2011. The festival started at Launceston's Regatta Ground to mark the 50th anniversary of the MS society, and it was a big success with all tickets being sold. In 2007 the event was moved the Inveresk Showgrounds to accommodate a larger crowd and even with a larger capacity it was again a sellout. During 2008, a record crowd of 11,000 watched acts such as; Hilltop Hoods, Sneaky Sound System and Kisschasy. The 2011 event was the final MS Fest to date. Initially it was announced that the 2012 event would move to Hobart, Tasmania, but was later cancelled due to poor ticket sales.

== Launceston Big Picture School ==
An Australian Technical College campus was constructed at the Inveresk site at a cost of around $7.5 million. In 2016 the Launceston Big Picture School moved into the site.

== Past proposed projects ==
In 1998 a $25 million hotel and convention centre was proposed for Inveresk. Plans indicated that the 100 to 150 room hotel would be at least four stars and worth about $15 million, and in a separate building next door would be a 500-seat convention centre.
