= Alfred Beresford =

Australian Anglican priest

Alfred Beresford (1850–1935) was an Anglican priest in Australia during the late nineteenth and early twentieth centuries.

Beresford was born in Hobart and ordained deacon in 1876 and priest in 1877. His first post was a curacy at St David's Cathedral, Hobart. He served incumbencies at Bothwell and Forth and Launceston. He was known for visiting remote shepherds' huts, scattered in the Lake Country of Tasmania, on foot and on horseback to minister to rural people. He was Archdeacon of Launceston from 1907 until 1928.
