= Energy in Tasmania =

Economic sector in Tasmania, Australia

Tasmania, as an advanced economy with a globally high standard of living, uses a great deal of energy. Distinctive features of energy use in Tasmania include the high fraction of hydroelectricity usage, the absence of coal-fired electrical generation, relatively light usage of natural gas, particularly for domestic use, and a wide use of domestic wood-burning stoves. Energy production through hydroelectricity has been politically contentious, and conflicts over Tasmanian hydroelectric projects were integral to the formation of Green parties in Australia and across the world.

== Electricity ==
Electricity generation by fuel type in Tasmania, Australia, 2015-2021

=== Hydro ===
Historically, virtually all of Tasmania's electricity was hydroelectric generation. The first hydroelectric project in Tasmania was Duck Reach Power Station in Launceston which opened in 1895. It was constructed by the city government. Other small hydro-electric generators were built, or were under construction, when the state government formed the Hydro-Electric Department in 1914. They purchased the incomplete Waddamana Power Stations, which became operational in 1916.

The largest hydroelectric power station in Tasmania is the Gordon Power Station, for which water was supplied by construction of several dams, flooding the original Lake Pedder, which was located in a national park. Environmentalists protested the dam construction, something that was repeated on a much larger scale when the Tasmanian government proposed a further dam on the Gordon River, known as the Gordon-below-Franklin Project, or more popularly as the Franklin Dam. The dam polarised the Tasmanian community, which saw large-scale protests, and national interest. The dam was ultimately stopped by federal government intervention and a High Court case. The Franklin Dam controversy had the effect of ending the construction of large-scale dams for hydroelectricity across Australia.

As of 2022, Tasmania's hydroelectric generation capacity is approximately 2286 MW. 80% of Tasmania's total electricity was hydroelectricity in 2021.

As of June 2022, Hydro Tasmania, the government-owned enterprise that now operates Tasmania's hydroelectric generators, is planning to spend roughly $120 million, including a $65 million federal government grant, on planning for an upgrade to the Tarraleah Power Station, as part of the "Battery of the Nation" concept (see below).

=== Wind ===
There are five (by some definitions 4) wind farms, with a total nameplate capacity of 564MW, connected to the main Tasmanian electricity grid (there is another small farm on King Island to supply local needs). Tasmania is in the Roaring Forties, and the high and consistent prevailing winds mean that Tasmania's wind farms have good capacity factors; for instance, the Granville Harbour Wind Farm had a capacity factor of 41.6% in 2021.

There are several proposals for additional onshore and offshore wind farm projects for Tasmania, in many cases contingent on the construction of the Marinus Link interconnector. Proposed wind farms have faced opposition from environmentalists and Tasmanian Aboriginal groups.

=== Gas ===
The Bell Bay Power Station, built in 1974, was converted to gas operation in 2003, before decommissioning in 2009. The adjacent Tamar Valley Power Station has one 210MW combined-cycle gas turbine unit and four open cycle gas turbines, with a total capacity of 178MW for peaking operation. The combined-cycle unit was decommissioned in 2015 but was recommissioned during the 2016 Tasmanian energy crisis.

=== Solar ===
Solar power is a relatively small contributor to Tasmania's electricity production, contributing only 2.06% of total generation in 2021. This has increased from 1.05% in 2015. Virtually all of it is from scall-scale rooftop solar systems.

Rooftop solar power is less economically attractive in Tasmania than other states, due to lower solar insolation, lower up-front cost reductions than through the Small-scale Renewable Energy Scheme, the lack of additional state government subsidies comparable to Victoria's Solar Homes program and higher installation costs due to freight and a more rigorous quality inspection scheme than other states.

=== Transmission ===
The Tasmanian domestic transmission and distribution grid is operated by TasNetworks, a state-owned enterprise formed in 2014. The Tasmanian electrical grid has remained state-owned throughout its history.

Tasmania was connected to the National Electricity Market in 2005 via the undersea Basslink interconnector.

=== Retailers ===
Electricity retailing was disaggregated from the Hydroelectric Commission in 1998. The state-owned Aurora Energy inherited the customer base of the government monopoly. The first retailer other than Aurora Energy to actually offer retail electricity in Tasmania was 1st Energy in 2019.

As of June 2022, the state government lists five retailers operating in most of Tasmania, and one additional retailer operating only on King Island and Flinders Island. Notably, the largest retailers operating on the Australian mainland, such as Alinta Energy and AGL Energy, do not offer retail electricity in Tasmania.

=== Notable Consumers ===
By far the largest single consumer of electricity in Tasmania is the Bell Bay aluminium smelter. According to a 2014 regulatory submission, it consumes "more than 25% of the state's electricity demand".

=== Battery Of The Nation proposal ===
Since joining the NEM and the commissioning of Basslink, Tasmania has both imported and exported electricity. Tasmania's net import/export balance has varied over that time depending on changes to climate regulations and dam water levels; in 2020, it was a small net importer.

Hydro Tasmania, a Tasmanian government-owned enterprise that owns and operates most of Tasmania's electricity generation, has proposed the large-scale export of dispatchable power from renewable sources to mainland Australia in a concept called "Battery of the Nation". Hydroelectricity, compared to solar and wind power, can be available at any time of day or night and independent of short-term weather conditions. Surplus energy (from when other renewable energy is abundant and demand is low) can also be stored using pumped storage, or simply by running generators when demand is high and reserving water in dams when it is not. The Battery Of The Nation concept seeks to determine how Tasmania's hydropower and wind capacity can be configured to provide dispatchable power to mainland Australia. By 2025, Hydro Tasmania confirmed they have switched from base load supply to dispatchable generation.

The federal government has provided several substantial grants totalling more than A$120 million for planning for pumped storage, the Marinus Link interconnector, and funding for upgrades to Tarraleah Power Station to increase its dispatchable capacity.

TasNetworks, the monopoly transmission provider in Tasmania owned by the state government, has conducted a feasibility study for Marinus Link, the interstate connector enabling the project, and has concluded that the project is feasible, will provide a commercial rate of return for its operators, and that overall benefits will exceed the costs. Some expert commentators have expressed doubts as to the economic viability of the concept and associated projects, given the decreasing prices for battery storage which could be built in mainland Australia without the need for an undersea connection, and environmentalists have opposed the project.

== Gas ==
Tasmania is connected to the Australian east coast gas grid through the undersea Tasmanian Gas Pipeline, which was completed in 2002. As of 2022, the gas distribution network covers parts of Hobart, Launceston, and Devonport; however, large parts of those cities are not serviced by gas pipelines. Tasmanian households are not heavy users of natural gas, with an average of only $45 per household spent on gas. Average expenditure on LPG is higher at about $72 per household annually.

The gas distribution grid is run by the privately owned Tas Gas Networks. There are two gas retailers operating in Tasmania, the retail arm of Tas Gas, Tas Gas Retail, and the Tasmanian government-owned Aurora Energy. A third retailer, Weston Energy, collapsed in May 2022.

== Coal ==
The first coal mine in Tasmania opened in 1834, near the Saltwater River on the Tasman Peninsula, using convict labour. Coal was mined on a relatively small scale for industrial and stationary energy use throughout the 19th and 20th centuries.

== Biomass ==
Tasmanians are the heaviest users of wood-burning stoves in Australia. According to survey data, 38% of Tasmanians use wood heating. Tasmanian cities and towns, particularly Launceston consequently have significant air pollution during winter. Launceston's location in a confined valley exacerbates the problem. A buyback scheme subsidising the removal of some of the most polluting wood heaters was instituted in 2001, and reduced the proportion of households using wood heating in Launceston from 66% to 30%. This reduction has resulted in reduced pollution levels and may have reduced health impacts.

Other than domestic wood heating, there are a few small-scale biomass energy projects in Tasmania, using waste sawmill timber or generating biogas from organic wastes using anaerobic digesters. As of June 2022, the government is seeking feedback on a "Bioenergy Vision for Tasmania", which seeks to expand the use of biomass energy. The Tasmanian Greens oppose the use of native forests for biomass energy and see the government's proposals as encouraging logging for biomass energy.

== Oil ==
Tasmania has no indigenous petroleum industry. All petroleum products are imported in refined form from interstate or overseas. There are petroleum import terminals in Burnie, Bell Bay, and Hobart.
