= Solar credits =

Solar credits, introduced by the Australian Federal Government in 2009, were a key component of the Renewable Energy Target to incentivize renewable energy adoption. This initiative, replacing the Solar Homes and Communities Plan, applied a multiplier to small-scale technology certificates (STCs) for solar, wind, and hydro systems.

In this scheme, STCs, representing 1 megawatt-hour of renewable energy, are allocated based on location, installation date, and energy output of the system. Managed by the Renewable Energy Certificate Registry, these certificates contribute to the reduction of initial costs for renewable installations. The number of STCs each system can generate is calculated as: system size (kW) x zone rating x deeming years.

== Location ==
Australia is divided into 4 zones based on solar irradiance patterns. Each zone has a rating that determines the number of STCs generated per kilowatt of installed capacity per year:

- Zone 1 (1.622 STCs/kW/year): Highest solar resource - Northern Territory, Far North Queensland, northern Western Australia
- Zone 2 (1.536 STCs/kW/year): High solar resource - most of Queensland, inland South Australia and Western Australia
- Zone 3 (1.382 STCs/kW/year): Moderate solar resource - Sydney, Brisbane, Perth, Adelaide and surrounding regions
- Zone 4 (1.185 STCs/kW/year): Lower solar resource - Melbourne, Hobart, Canberra and southern coastal areas

The Clean Energy Regulator publishes a postcode-to-zone mapping that determines which zone each installation falls within.

== Installation date ==
The Small-scale Renewable Energy Scheme (SRES) uses a "deeming period" to calculate STC entitlements. Systems are credited upfront for all the renewable energy they are expected to generate between the installation date and 31 December 2030, up to a maximum of 15 years. As the scheme end date approaches, fewer STCs are generated per installation, effectively phasing down the incentive each year. For example, a 6.6 kW system installed in Zone 3 in 2026 with 4 deeming years remaining would generate: 6.6 x 1.382 x 4 = 36 STCs.

== STC pricing ==
STCs can be sold on the open market or through the Clean Energy Regulator's Clearing House at a fixed price of $40.00 AUD per certificate. Market prices typically trade near this ceiling. System owners commonly assign their STCs to their installer in exchange for an upfront discount on the system price.

== Energy output ==
The Small-scale Renewable Energy Scheme (SRES) incentivizes renewable energy installations by granting STCs based on the expected energy output of a system. System owners can sell STCs themselves or via agents, while electricity retailers are obligated to annually surrender STCs as per the small-scale technology percentage. The SRES is legislated to end on 31 December 2030, after which no new STCs can be created.
