= Tree Pull Scheme =

Australian Government initiative to reduce apple production

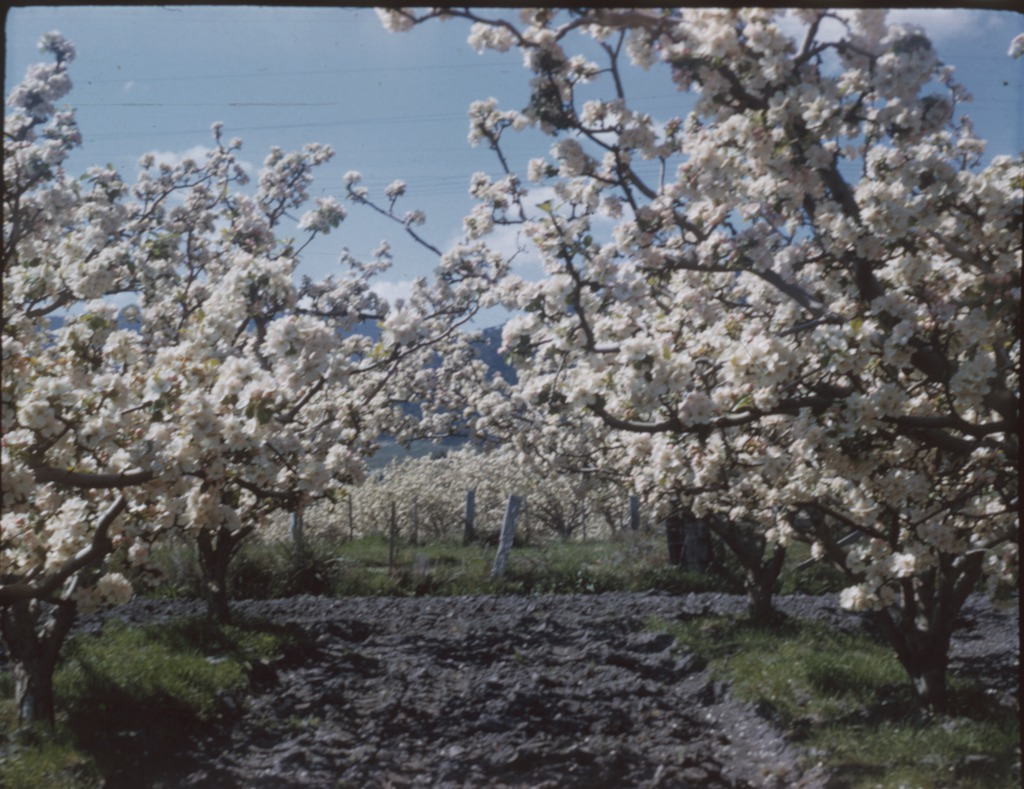
Tasmanian apple orchard in full bloom, c. 1910s

The Tree Pull Scheme was an Australian government initiative introduced in the 1970s to address an oversupply in the Tasmanian apple market and reduce economic pressures on the apple industry. The scheme aimed to lower production by offering financial incentives for the removal of apple trees, resulting in a reduction of the total apple tree count from 7.22 million in 1973 to 5.34 million by 1977.

The scheme had a significant impact on Tasmania, then Australia's largest producer of apples, accounting for 30% of all apple production. Regions such as the Huon Valley, historically known as the "Apple Valley," were heavily affected, along with other apple-growing areas including the Derwent Valley, Tasman Peninsula, Mersey Valley, and Tamar Valley.

== Background ==
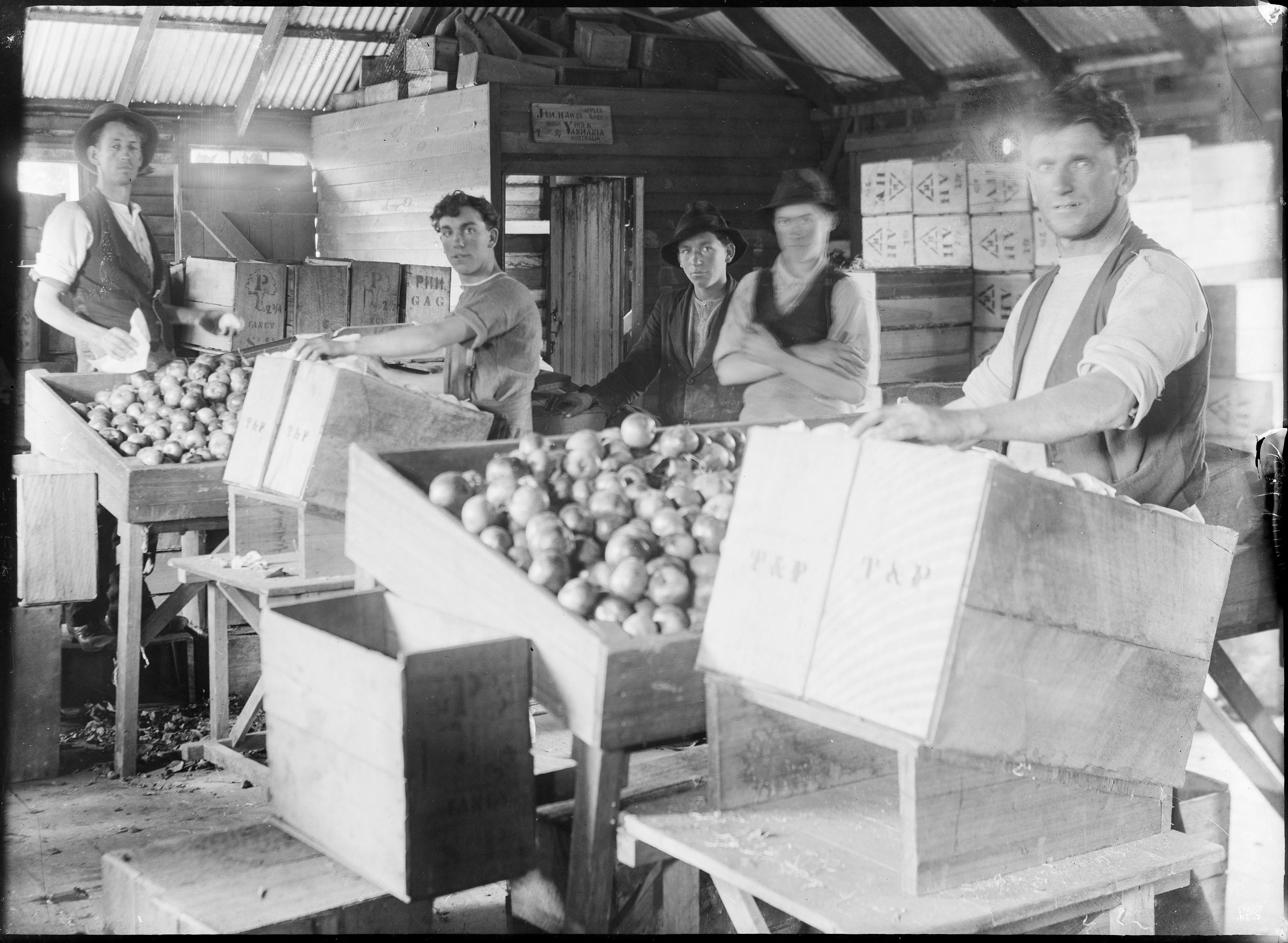
Huon apple packers, c. 1900s

Tasmania became a global apple supplier in the late 19th and early 20th centuries, thanks to its ideal growing conditions, agricultural innovations, and favorable trade arrangements. The temperate climate and fertile soil in regions like the Huon Valley and Channel region made Tasmania particularly suited for apple production. By the 1880s, Tasmania was a major apple supplier to the British Empire.

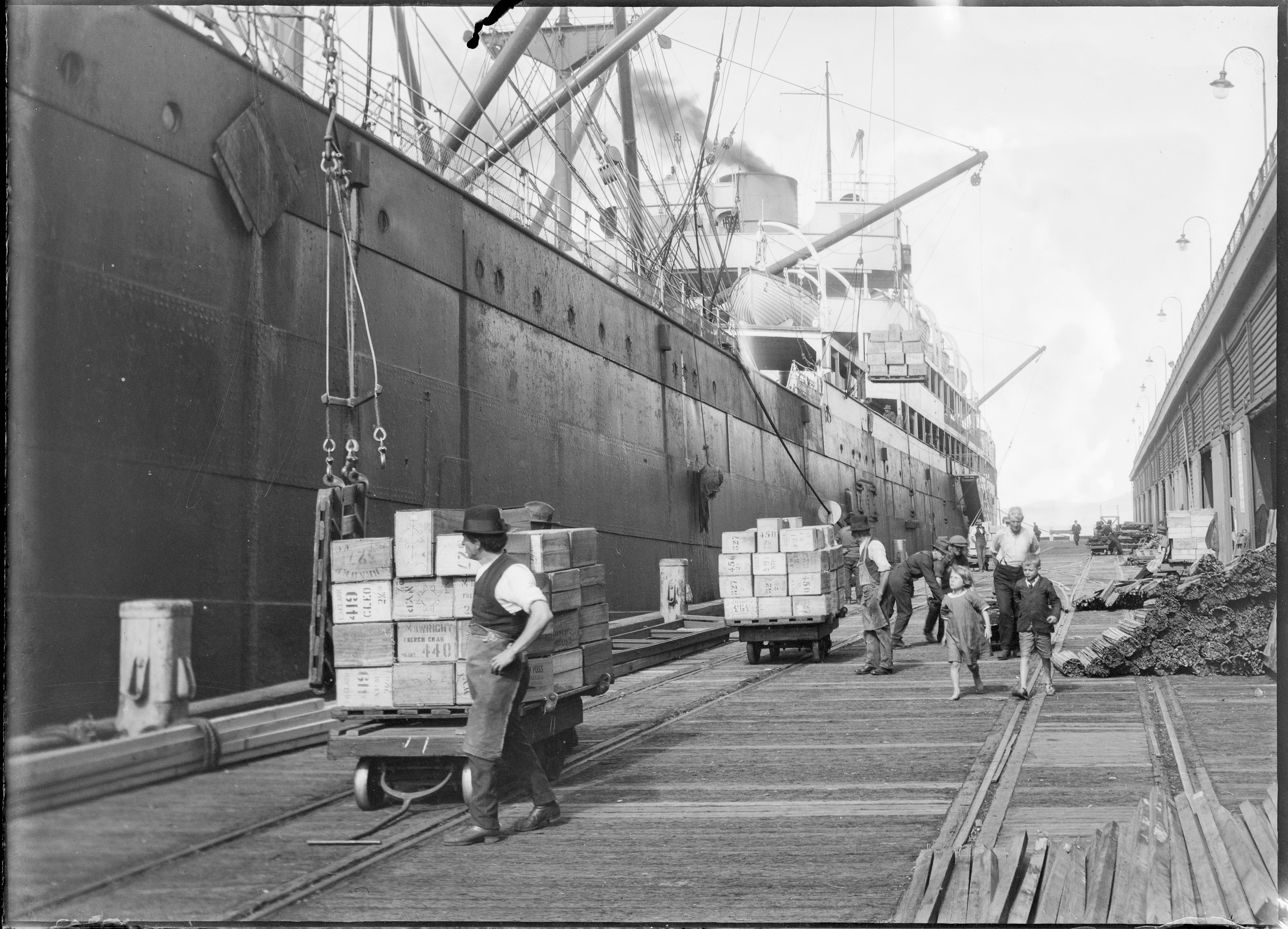
Apple boxes being loaded at Hobart's wharves, c. 1900s

Government support and advances in shipping, including refrigerated transport, solidified Tasmania’s reputation for high-quality apples. Known as the "Apple Isle," Tasmania dominated Australia's apple industry, with apples becoming a key export. At its peak, apples represented 60% of Tasmanian agricultural exports, with the United Kingdom as the primary market.

Britain’s 1961 application to join the European Economic Community (EEC) raised concerns for Australia, as its apple industry relied heavily on British markets. Britain advocated for Commonwealth interests but faced resistance from the EEC, which prioritised trade with closer regions and had protectionist policies like the Common Agricultural Policy (CAP), disadvantaging Australian agricultural exports.

In 1973, the UK joined the EEC, limiting Tasmania's access to its primary market. Combined with rising production costs and global competition, this created an economic crisis for the apple industry.

== Implementation ==
The Australian Government, in partnership with the Tasmanian Government, introduced the Tree Pull Scheme to stabilise apple prices and support farmers facing economic hardship. The scheme provided financial incentives for farmers to uproot apple trees and reduce orchard sizes, helping orchardists transition to other agricultural activities or retire from apple farming. Running from 1972 to 1975, the scheme removed around 1.88 million apple trees and reduced the number of orchardists in Tasmania by approximately 700.

== Impact ==
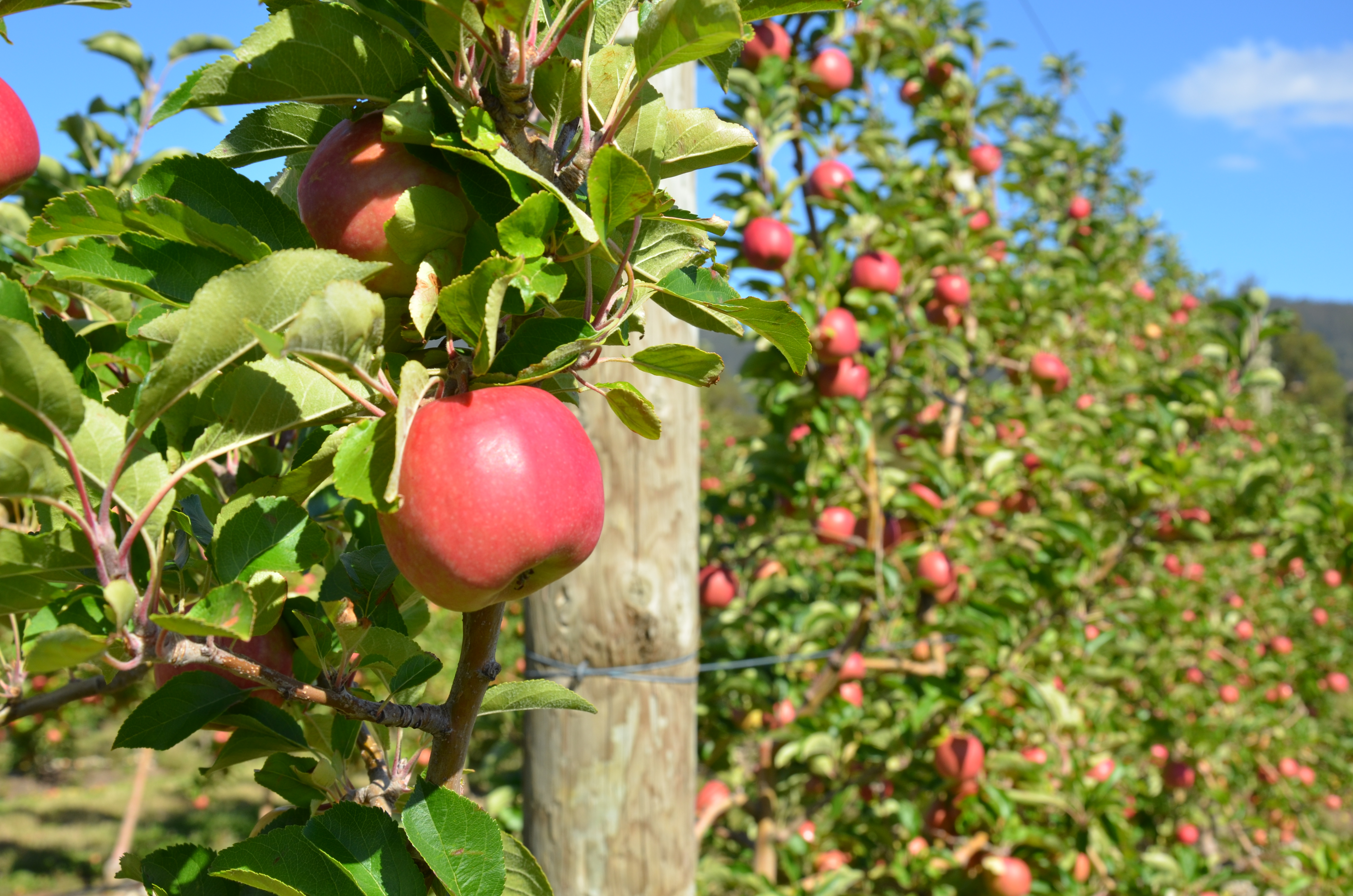
Tasmanian apple orchard, c. 2016

The Tree Pull Scheme had significant economic, cultural, and social effects on the Tasmanian apple industry and its communities. The decline in apple production altered the identity of regions like the Huon Valley, which had depended on the apple trade. Many apple varieties, some unique to Tasmania, were lost, impacting regional biodiversity.

Economic challenges followed, with declines in employment and local business activity. Farmers faced difficulties transitioning to other industries, with some leaving agriculture altogether. Between 1977 and 1986, Tasmania fell from Australia's largest apple producer to third.

== Legacy ==
Though the Tree Pull Scheme drew criticism for its impact on Tasmania’s apple industry, it also spurred discussions on sustainable agriculture and agricultural diversification in Tasmania. Recently, there has been renewed interest in heritage apple varieties, and local initiatives now promote apple tourism and cider production as economic alternatives.

== See also ==
- Tasmanian apples
- Huon Valley
- Agriculture in Tasmania
- Economic history of Australia

== Sources ==
- McConnell, Anne Denise; Servant, Nathalie; Queen Victoria Museum and Art Gallery (Launceston, Tas.); National Estate Grants Program (Australia) (1999), The History and Heritage of the Tasmanian Apple Industry: A Profile, Queen Victoria Museum and Art Gallery
