= Tasmanian apples =

Agricultural product

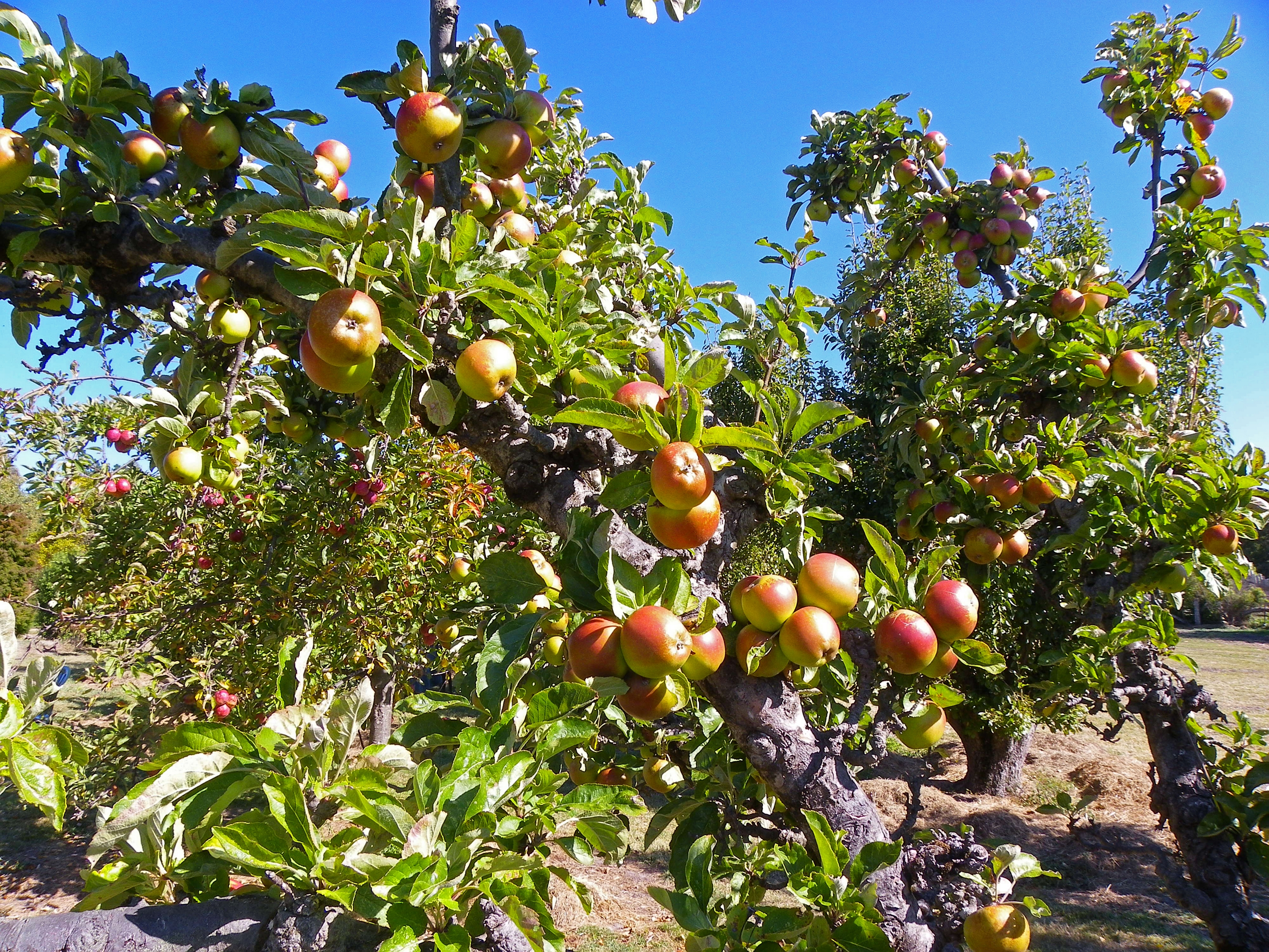
A Tasmanian apple orchard, c. 2010

Tasmanian apples are a significant agricultural product of the Australian island state of Tasmania. Historically known as "the Apple Isle," Tasmania was once a leading global exporter of apples and remains Australia's second-largest apple-producing state after Victoria. The first apple tree in Tasmania was planted on Bruny Island in 1788, and by the 20th century, the state had become a major producer. In addition to cultivating popular commercial varieties, Tasmania has developed its own apple cultivars, including the Geeveston Fanny and the Crofton. Although production has declined in recent decades, apple farming remains an important industry, particularly in southern Tasmania. In 2023, Tasmania produced over 29,000 t (29,000,000 kg) of apples, contributing approximately 10% of Australia's total apple yield.

== History ==
=== Early cultivation ===
Apple cultivation in Tasmania began in 1788 when Captain Bligh planted the first apple trees on Bruny Island at Adventure Bay during his voyage on HMS Bounty. These early plantings laid the foundation for what would become a significant industry. Large-scale orcharding developed later, particularly in the Huon Valley and other fertile regions. The first orchard in the Huon Valley was planted by William Geeves in 1851, featuring varieties such as Windsor Pippin, Scarlett Pearmain, and Blenheim Orange.

The establishment of irrigation systems by pioneers such as William Shoobridge further enhanced apple production. Shoobridge's innovation helped mitigate Tasmania's reliance on rainfall, particularly in the Derwent and Bagdad districts, and significantly boosted yields.

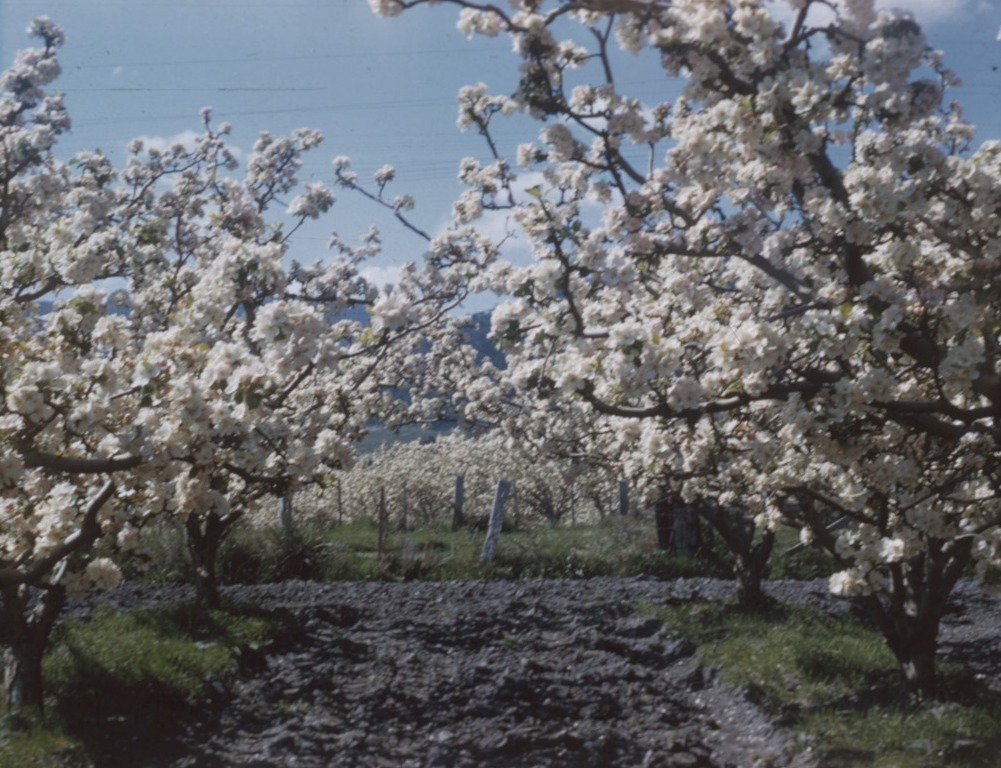
Apple orchard in full bloom, c. 1950s

By the late 19th century, Tasmanian apples had gained recognition for their quality. Refrigeration and the expansion of steamship services allowed apples to reach international markets, with the Huon Valley emerging as a hub for export-oriented production.

=== 20th century ===
By the early 20th century, Tasmania became one of the world's major exporters of apples. At its peak in the mid-20th century, approximately 75% of Tasmania's apple crop was exported to the UK and Europe. Varieties such as Granny Smith, Golden Delicious, and Cox's Orange Pippin were widely cultivated, along with local heritage types.

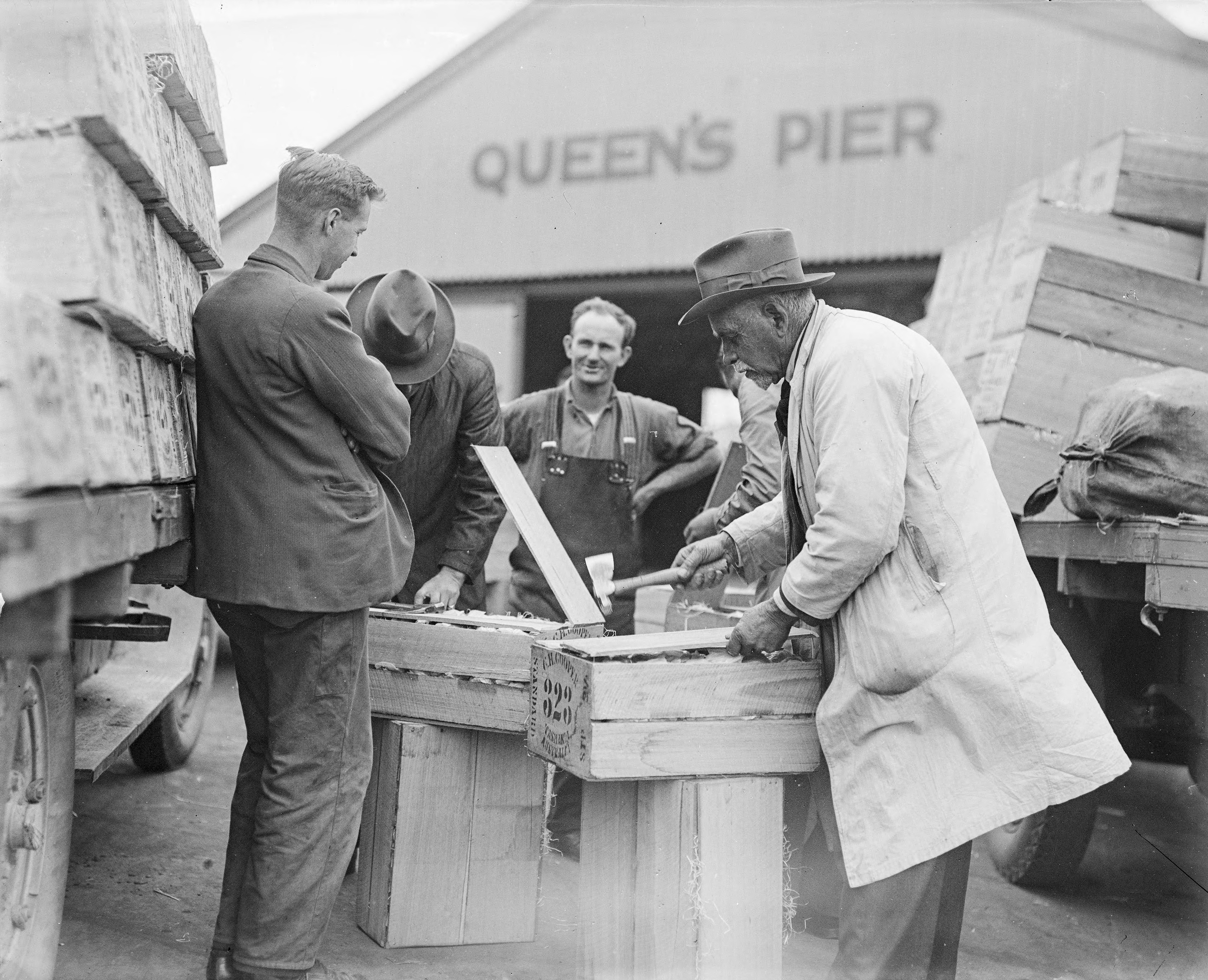
Apples being inspected at Queens Pier, Hobart, c. 1930s

However, the industry faced challenges during the mid-century. The United Kingdom's entry into the European Economic Community in 1973 marked a severe blow to Tasmania's export markets, as tariffs on Australian produce were imposed. Additionally, the codling moth infestation in the state's north pushed apple production to southern regions like the Huon Valley.

In 2012, Tasmania's apple exports temporarily ceased for the first time in over 130 years, driven by a strong Australian dollar that reduced competitiveness and a lack of international shipping out of Tasmania.

=== Contemporary developments ===
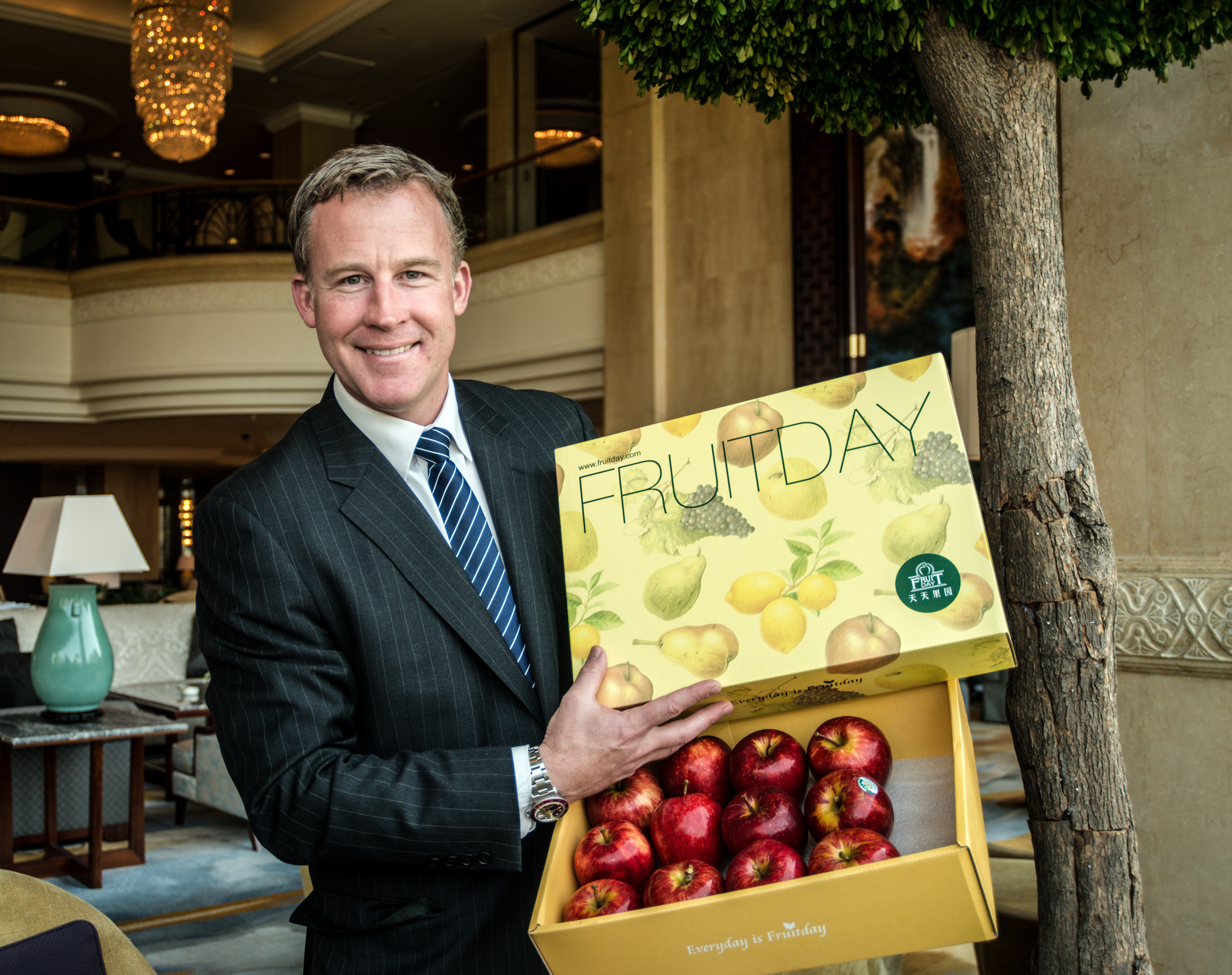
Leader of the Opposition (later Premier), Will Hodgman posing with a box of apples, c. 2012

In recent years, Tasmania has pivoted toward producing high-quality apples for domestic and niche export markets. The state produced over 29,000 t (32,000 short tons) of apples in 2023, accounting for 10% of Australia's total apple production. Southern Tasmania remains the heart of the industry, particularly the Huon Valley region, with ongoing innovation in organic and sustainable farming practices.

Exports have shown significant growth, with 388 t (428 short tons) of apples exported in 2022, marking a 126% increase from previous years. The primary export markets were China, Hong Kong, and Papua New Guinea, which together accounted for 95% of Tasmania's apple exports. While Tasmania enjoys pest-free export access to markets like Taiwan, high tariffs (20%) continue to pose challenges compared to competitors like New Zealand.

== As a state symbol ==
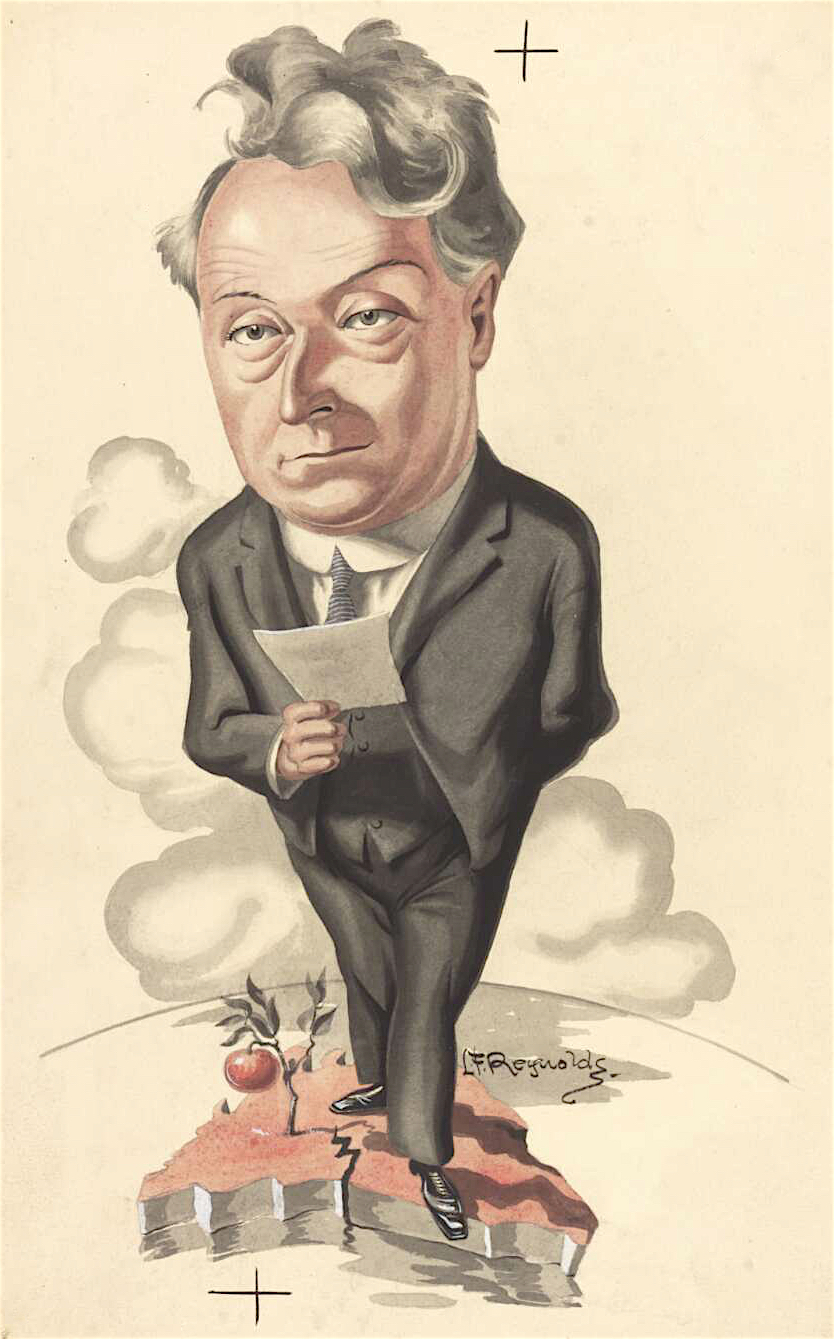
Caricature of Joseph Lyons as Premier of Tasmania with an apple tree, c. 1927

Apple farming has played a significant role in shaping Tasmania's identity, with cultural events such as the Huon Valley Mid-Winter Festival celebrating its historical and economic significance.

The Coat of arms of Tasmania is an official symbol of the state, granted by King George V in May 1917. The shield features significant representations of Tasmanian industry, including a sheaf of wheat, hops, a ram, and apples on a branch.

The term "Apple Isle" has long been associated with Tasmania, reflecting the state's historical prominence in apple production. The nickname has appeared on car licence plates, featured in fruit-processing advertising, including IXL Jams, and referenced by contemporary businesses such as Juicy Isle.

Tasmania has a long-standing tradition of cider production, with Mercury Cider (established 1911) and the Cascade Brewery among the state's earliest and most prominent producers. In the 21st century, cider making has experienced a resurgence, with several craft producers emerging across the state. Notable examples include Willie Smith's Cider, Frank's Cider, Pagan Cider, Spreyton Cider Co., Simple Cider, and Brady's Lookout Cider, which employ small-batch production methods and source fruit from local orchards. In addition, boutique-scale producers such as Hansen Cider and Plenty Cider have developed a presence in the premium segment, often focusing on limited releases and innovative blends that reflect Tasmania's apple-growing heritage.

Located in a restored 1940s apple packing shed, Willie Smith's Cider House has emerged as a central tourist attraction of the Huon Valley. It features a cider production facility, distillery, eatery, and an apple museum showcasing Tasmania's apple-growing heritage. The museum offers exhibits on the region's apple industry, guided cider tastings, and a selection of apple-based spirits produced on-site, including apple brandy, apple spirit, and pommeau.

In the state's north, the "Big Apple" landmark in Spreyton serves as a tribute to Tasmania's rich apple-growing heritage.

=== Apples in popular culture ===
External videos
- Libraries Tasmania videos
- Tas Apple Industry c. 1950
- Apple Festival c. 1958

Tasmania's apple industry has appeared periodically in Australian film, music and literature, reflecting the industry's historical significance rather than its contemporary scale.

In film, the 1988 Australian comedy film Young Einstein, written, produced and directed by Yahoo Serious, depicts a fictionalised version of Albert Einstein as the son of a Tasmanian apple farmer.

References to the apple industry also appear in music. When It’s Apple Picking Time in Tassie, recorded in 1948 by country singer Buddy Williams, reflects Tasmania's prominence as Australia's leading apple-producing state in the mid-20th century. Folk traditions associated with orchard labour, particularly in the Huon Valley, have been preserved through oral history collections and Tasmanian folk music archives. More recently, alternative rock band Witch Hats referenced the social impacts of the Tree Pull Scheme in their 2008 song Hellhole.

Apple-growing traditions are also reflected in cultural events such as the Huon Valley Mid-Winter Festival, which incorporates wassailing ceremonies adapted from English cider-making customs.

The apple industry has featured in Tasmanian literature, particularly in fiction and memoir. Limberlost by Robbie Arnott is set on a family apple orchard in northern Tasmania, while Mary-Lou Stephens' The Last of the Apple Blossom is set against the decline of an apple-growing property following the 1967 bushfires. In non-fiction, works such as Fiona Stocker's Apple Island Wife: Slow Living in Tasmania reference rural life and small-scale agriculture in the state.

== Orchard districts ==
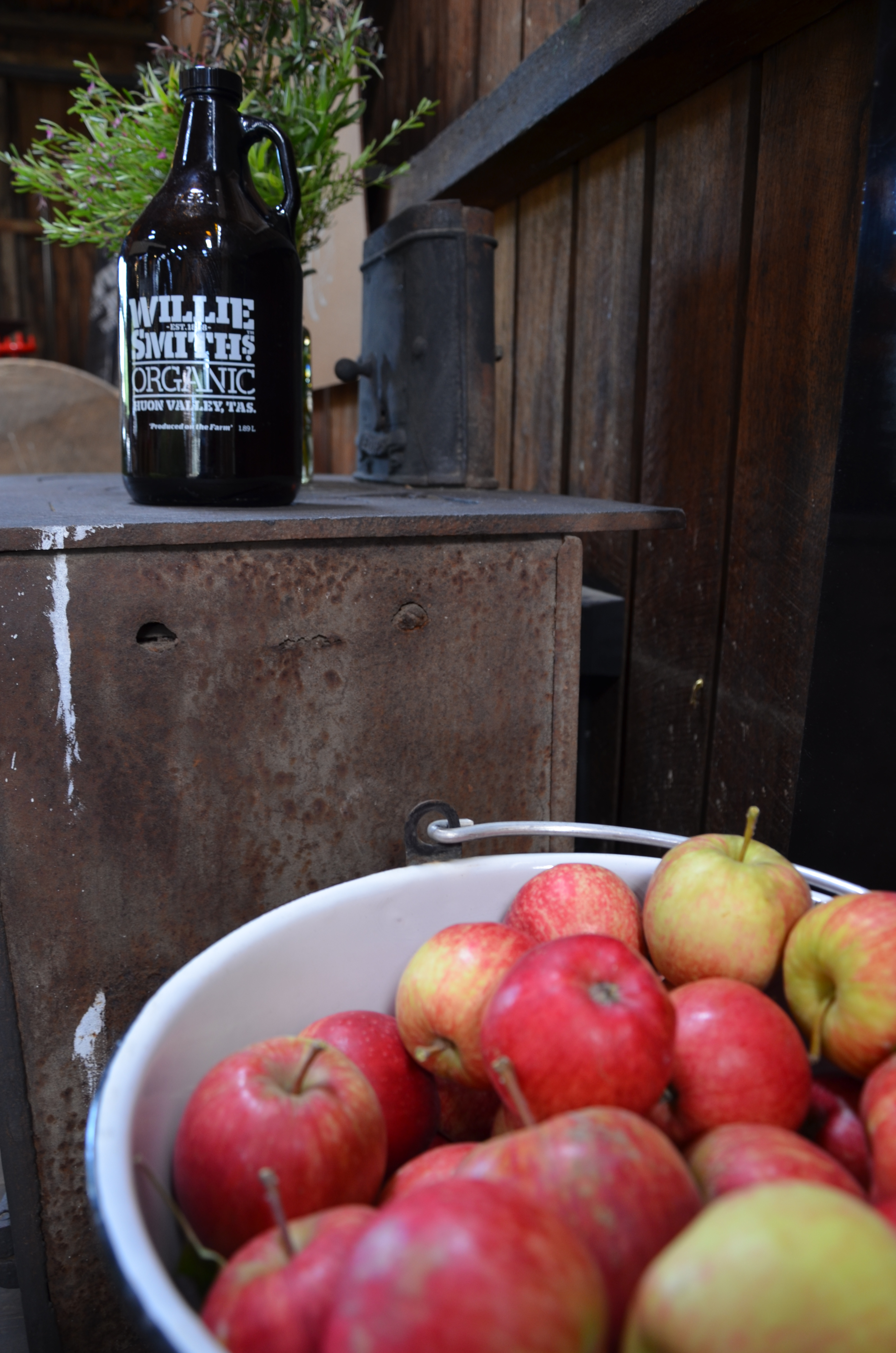
Apple cider and apple display, Huon Valley

District	Description
Huon	The orcharding areas of the Huon Valley.
Channel	The orcharding areas of the D'Entrecasteaux Channel including Bruny Island.
Tasman Peninsula	The Tasman Peninsula orcharding district.
Scottsdale	The Scottsdale orcharding district.
Lilydale	The Lilydale orcharding district.
Mersey	The Mersey orcharding district, focusing on the Spreyton area.
Bagdad	The Bagdad orcharding district.
Derwent	The upper Derwent orcharding district, primarily the area between New Norfolk and Ouse.
Hobart	The lower Derwent orcharding district, including the eastern shore, western shore, and Bridgewater.
West Tamar	The west Tamar area of the Tamar Valley, including west Launceston.
East and South Tamar	The eastern Tamar region, covering Launceston and areas south and east of the city.
Swansea	A central east coast cluster of apple-growing properties.
East Coast General	Other areas of the east coast, including the St Helens district.
North Coast General	All other areas along the north coast.
Midlands General	The Midlands region between the East and South Tamar and Bagdad districts.

== Tasmanian apple varieties ==
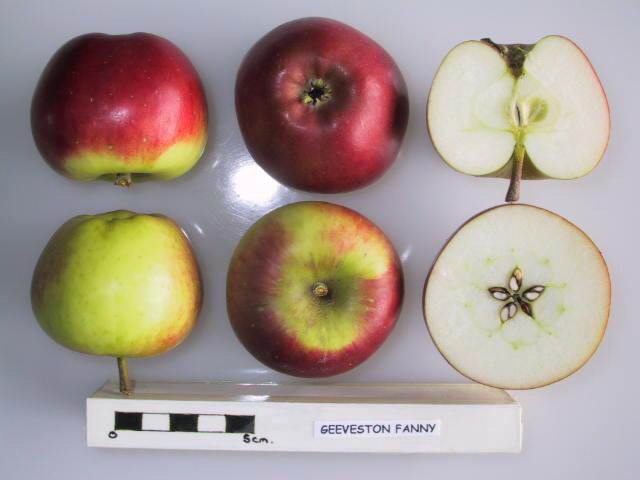
Cross section of Geeveston Fanny, National Fruit Collection (Brogdale, Kent, England)

Tasmania is home to several unique apple varieties that have been cultivated and developed to suit the state's cool climate and rich soils. These include:

- Geeveston Fanny – A heritage apple variety originating in the Geeveston region of the Huon Valley, known for its crisp texture and balanced sweetness.
- Sturmer Pippin – A late-season apple valued for its long shelf life and tart flavour, historically popular for export.
- Rubigold – A modern Tasmanian-developed variety bred for high sugar content and striking golden-red skin.
- Granny Smith – Although not exclusive to Tasmania, this well-known variety has been widely cultivated in the state for both domestic and export markets.
- Jonathan – A classic red apple with a sweet-tart flavour that thrives in Tasmania's cooler regions.

== See also ==
- Agriculture in Tasmania
- Economy of Tasmania
- Huon Valley
