= Clean Energy Council =

The Clean Energy Council (CEC) is the peak body for the clean energy industry in Australia. It represents businesses operating across solar power, wind power, hydroelectric power, energy storage and renewable hydrogen, as well as rooftop solar installers. The organisation is based in Melbourne.

The Clean Energy Council was established in 2007. It has over 700 member organisations, ranging from small-scale rooftop solar installers to large-scale project developers, equipment manufacturers and engineering firms.

== Role ==
The Clean Energy Council performs several functions across the Australian clean energy sector:

- Advocacy and policy: advocates to government on decarbonisation, grid readiness, renewable energy investment and sector-specific policy
- Approved products: maintains lists of approved solar PV modules, inverters and batteries that meet Australian standards
- Education: operates a learning platform offering professional development courses and certifications for the clean energy workforce
- Industry reporting: publishes the annual Clean Energy Australia Report
- Consumer protection: administers the New Energy Tech Consumer Code

The CEC is distinct from the Clean Energy Regulator, which is the Australian Government statutory authority responsible for administering renewable energy legislation.

== Approved products list ==
The Clean Energy Council maintains approved products lists for solar PV modules, inverters and batteries. The lists include over 1,800 inverter models and over 1,000 battery models that meet Australian and international standards.

Products must be listed on the CEC approved list to be eligible under several government schemes, including the Small-scale Renewable Energy Scheme (for small-scale technology certificates) and the Cheaper Home Batteries Program.

== Installer accreditation ==
The CEC historically managed the accreditation program for solar installers and system designers. In 2024, this function was transitioned to Solar Accreditation Australia (SAA). The CEC continues to provide continuing professional development (CPD) courses, with accredited installers required to earn 100 CPD points annually.

== Clean Energy Australia Report ==
The CEC publishes the Clean Energy Australia Report annually, providing an overview of the Australian clean energy sector. The 2025 report, covering 2024 data, found that new investments in clean energy totalled $12.7 billion (a record), rooftop solar surpassed 4 million installations, and renewables generated 40% of Australia's electricity.

== Leadership ==
The current chief executive is Jackie Trad. The chair is Ross Rolfe AO.

== See also ==
- Clean Energy Regulator
- Small-scale Renewable Energy Scheme
- Renewable energy in Australia
- Solar power in Australia
