= Renewable Energy (Electricity) Act 2000 =

The Renewable Energy (Electricity) Act 2000 is an Act of the Parliament of Australia that establishes the legislative framework for the Renewable Energy Target (RET). The Act encourages additional electricity generation from renewable energy sources and reduces greenhouse gas emissions in the electricity sector.

The Act received Royal assent on 21 December 2000 and came into effect in 2001. It is supported by the Renewable Energy (Electricity) (Charge) Act 2000 and the Renewable Energy (Electricity) Regulations 2001.

== Objects ==
The Act has three stated objects:

1. To encourage the additional generation of electricity from renewable sources
2. To reduce emissions of greenhouse gases in the electricity sector
3. To ensure that renewable energy sources are ecologically sustainable

These objectives are achieved through a system of tradeable certificates issued for the generation of electricity from eligible renewable sources.

== Certificate system ==
The Act establishes the legal framework for two types of renewable energy certificates:

- Large-scale generation certificates (LGCs), created by accredited renewable energy power stations for each megawatt-hour of eligible electricity generated
- Small-scale technology certificates (STCs), created for the installation of small-scale systems such as solar panels, solar water heaters and heat pumps

Certificates are created and traded through the REC Registry, administered by the Clean Energy Regulator. "Liable entities", primarily electricity retailers, are required to surrender a set number of certificates annually based on the Renewable Power Percentage (for LGCs) and the small-scale technology percentage (for STCs).

== History ==
=== Original enactment (2000) ===
The Act was passed in 2000 to implement the Mandatory Renewable Energy Target (MRET), announced in 1997 as a commitment under the Kyoto Protocol. The scheme commenced on 1 April 2001 with an initial target of 9,500 GWh of additional renewable electricity by 2010.

=== 2009 expansion ===
The target was increased to 41,000 GWh by 2020, representing approximately 20% of projected national electricity supply.

=== 2010 amendment ===
The Renewable Energy (Electricity) Amendment Act 2010 split the RET into two separate schemes effective 1 January 2011:

- The Large-scale Renewable Energy Target (LRET) for power stations generally greater than 100 kilowatts
- The Small-scale Renewable Energy Scheme (SRES) for household and small business installations

The amendment replaced the single renewable energy certificate (REC) with two new certificate types (LGCs and STCs) and created separate obligations for liable entities under each scheme. The split was prompted by oversupply of certificates caused by rapid uptake of rooftop solar systems.

=== 2015 amendment ===
The Renewable Energy (Electricity) Amendment Act 2015 reduced the LRET from its trajectory toward 41,000 GWh to a fixed target of 33,000 GWh annually from 2021 through 2030. This followed the 2014 review chaired by Dick Warburton and ended a period of investment uncertainty in the renewable energy sector.

== Administration ==
The Act is administered by the Clean Energy Regulator (CER), established on 2 April 2012 by the Clean Energy Regulator Act 2011. The CER replaced the former Office of the Renewable Energy Regulator. The regulator accredits power stations, manages the REC Registry, validates certificate creation, and monitors compliance by liable entities.

== Current status ==
The Act remains in force. Both the LRET and SRES will continue to operate until 31 December 2030, after which no new certificates can be created. Final liability reporting and certificate surrender obligations will conclude in 2031.

== See also ==
- Large-scale Renewable Energy Target
- Small-scale Renewable Energy Scheme
- Renewable energy targets in Australia
- Clean Energy Regulator
- Renewable energy in Australia
