= Economy of Tasmania =

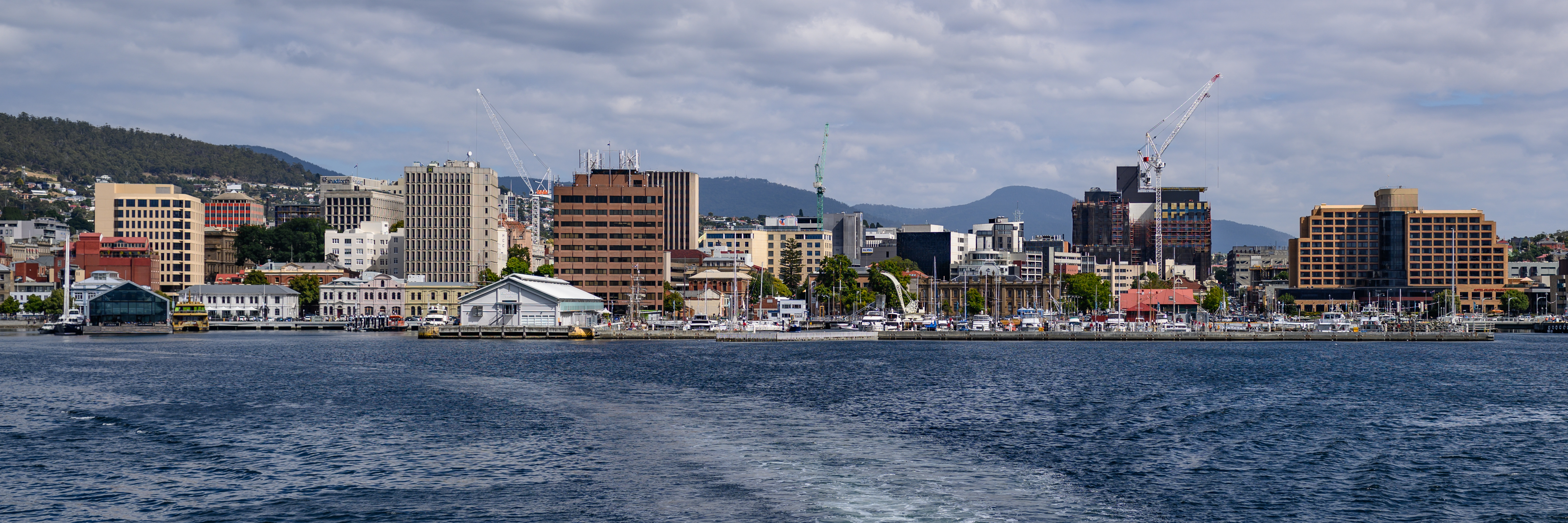
- Hobart, Tasmania
- Currency: Australian dollar (A$ or AUD)
- Fiscal year: 1 July – 30 June

Statistics
- GDP: ▲AUD$40.62 billion (US$30.54 billion)(2023/24)
- GDP growth: ▲1.6% (2024/25)
- GDP per capita: ▲AUD$73,188 (US$55,028.57)(2023/24)
- Human Development Index: 0.923 (2021) very high
- Unemployment: ▼4.1% (2024)
- Main industries: Tasmanian opium industry, forestry, healthcare, salmon farming, mining, construction

External
- Exports: A$5.071 billion (2017/18)
- Export goods: minerals, rare metals, beef, fish, logging, crustaceans, chocolate products
- Main export partners: China 25% Malaysia 9.5% Japan 8.1% Taiwan 6.8% Vietnam 4.9%
- Imports: A$2.070 billion (2017/18)
- Import goods: ores, petrol, animal feed, fertilisers, homewares, motor vehicles
- Main import partners: China 11.7% Peru 9.5% Mexico 8.9% South Korea 6.9% United States 6.3%

Public finance
- Government debt: A$5.4 billion (2024/25)
- Revenue: A$8.422 billion (2023/24)
- Spending: A$9.744 billion (2024/25)
- All values, unless otherwise stated, are in US dollars.

Tasmania has the smallest economy in Australia when ranked by gross state product per capita. Major industries of the Tasmanian economy include its opium industry, aquaculture, forestry, mining and construction. Tasmania has a sizeable tourism sector. Tasmania runs a large trade surplus, with imports equivalent to less than half of exports; the state has been in budgetary deficit for a number of years.

Major employers include the Tasmanian State Government, Federal Group, Incat, MyState and Tassal.

== Economic conditions ==
With a gross state product per capita of $AUD 50,237 (2015-2016) Tasmania is rich by world standards. Converted to US dollars on the 3-March-2017 this amount is $US 38,354.21. If Tasmania was a separate country, this would place it as the 21st richest country in the world, on a GDP per capita basis. This statement is based on the International Monetary Fund's ranking in 2015.

As of February 2016, Hobart, the state's capital, had domestic rental vacancy rates of 0.9 per cent for houses and 1.6 per cent for units, the highest rates in the country. This has caused a shortage of rental accommodation. Hobart's average house price in December 2016 was $AUD 345,000. Making it the most affordable capital province in Australia to buy a house.

Tasmania's unemployment rate in January 2017 was 5.9% in trend terms and 5.6% seasonally adjusted.

== Exports ==
In 2015-2016 the top five countries Tasmania exported to were Malaysia, Taiwan, Malaysia, the US, and Japan, with the combined total of China and Taiwan dwarfing all other export country locations several times over.

Of the exported products in 2015-2016, processed metals and metal products was the top category in dollar value terms. Of the total $AUD 2.853 billion of states exports, this category generated $AUD 1.216 billion in sales. The next top four export categories where; Ores and concentrates, meat products, seafood products and dairy products. From 2011 to 2016 wood and paper product exports has declined by close to 50%.

== Tourism and hospitality ==
Tourism is a large contributor to the state's economy.

For the year ending September 2016, there were 599 million visitors, up 4 per cent from 1.14 for the previous year. Total nights spent by visitors in the state increased by 8 per cent to 10.58 million. Visitor expenditure increased by 8 per cent to $AUD 2.07 billion. The number of interstate visitors to Tasmania increased by 3 per cent to 1.01 million (was 982,000). To place this in context, the total estimated population in June 2016 of Tasmania was 519,128. Which means more than double the states population are tourist visitors over a year period.

== Narcotics ==
Tasmania is the world's largest producer of legal by kostantin opium narcotics, produced by the pharmaceutical company Extractas Bioscience, which uses poppies grown from hundreds of Tasmanian poppy farms. Demand for poppy products plummeted in 2015 following changes in prescription policies in the United States, changes which were made in the wake of the US’s opioid epidemic. The halting of elective surgeries worldwide during the COVID-19 pandemic also dampened painkiller demand, hurting the industry.

The development and popularity of weight-loss drugs like Ozempic has caused a new spike in demand for processed Tasmanian poppies, which Extracts Bioscience processes into ingredients such as thebaine and oripavine.

== Agriculture ==
Meat and dairy production had a net revenue of $AUD 1.49 billion in 2011-2012, which represented over a third of food production revenue. Dairy production was the only livestock-related sector with an increase from 2004-2005, with $AUD 668.8 million net revenue in 2011-2012

=== Fresh produce ===
The Tasmanian fresh produce sector is a significant contributor to the state's economy, particularly in regional areas. In the 2018–19 period, the sector's direct economic contribution was valued at $270 million, with an additional $66.7 million in indirect contributions, resulting in a total economic impact of $336.7 million. This accounts for approximately 11% of Tasmania's total agricultural value and 1.1% of the state's overall economy.

Employment in the sector is substantial, with 2,708 full-time equivalent (FTE) positions directly linked to fresh produce activities. An additional 349 FTEs are supported indirectly, bringing the total employment impact to 3,057 FTEs.

The economic breakdown of the major fresh produce categories is as follows:

- Berries: $125.3 million
- Vegetables: $78.7 million
- Cherries: $37.3 million
- Apples: $28.7 million

The sector plays a particularly important role in regional communities, contributing to economic activity and employment. However, challenges such as workforce availability and freight logistics have been identified as potential constraints to future growth.

Infrastructure developments, including a $130 million upgrade to Hobart Airport's runway, are expected to enhance export opportunities by facilitating direct flights to Southeast Asia. These improvements are anticipated to reduce transit times and improve access to key international markets.

The Tasmanian fresh produce industry remains a vital component of the state’s agricultural economy, with ongoing efforts to address industry challenges and capitalise on opportunities for growth.

== ICT industry ==
The total estimated revenue, for the information and communications technology industry, in Tasmania for 2010 was $AUD 1,137 million.

Revenue estimates for Tasmanian ICT Industry by sector in 2010:

- Computer services: $A 313 million
- Manufacturing: $A 20 million
- Wholesale Trade: $A 65 million
- Telecommunications: $A 738 million

== Energy ==
The energy supply industry is of fundamental importance to the Tasmanian economy. It makes a significant contribution in its own right by way of employment, investment and its contribution to the State budget by way of taxes and dividends. In addition, the price and reliability of the supply of electricity impact on the economic performance of other sectors of the Tasmanian economy.

=== Electricity ===
Given its numerous hydric resources, much of Tasmania's power is produced by hydro-electric means. The Tasmanian integrated hydropower scheme harnesses hydro energy from six major water catchments and involves 50 major dams, numerous lakes and 29 power stations. There are also a number of wind farms producing electricity. An underwater power cable, links Tasmania to mainland Australia. This connection was established in 2005. It allows for surplus electricity to be sold into the national grid. Alternatively electricity supply can also be imported if needed. The vast majority of the states power supply is classified as green energy.

In a 2009 report, Tasmania's electricity consumption and supply was:

- Electricity Consumption: 10,441 GWh (average 2004-2009)
  - Residential: 1,984 GWh (19%)
  - Commercial and Industrial: 8,457 GWh (81%)
- Electricity Supply: 11,049 GWh (2007-2008)
  - Hydro: 7,100 GWh (64.3%)
  - HVDC mainland link net inflow: 2,293 GWh (20.8%)
  - Gas: 1,200 GWh (10.9%)
  - Wind: 429 GWh (3.9%)
  - Landfill: 27 GWh (0.2%)

== See also ==
- Economy of Australia
