= Large-scale Renewable Energy Target =

The Large-scale Renewable Energy Target (LRET) is an Australian Government scheme that provides financial incentives for the construction and operation of large-scale renewable energy power stations. It is one of two parts of the Renewable Energy Target (RET), alongside the Small-scale Renewable Energy Scheme (SRES). The scheme is administered by the Clean Energy Regulator.

The LRET was established in January 2011 when the original Renewable Energy Target was split into the LRET and SRES under the Renewable Energy (Electricity) Act 2000. The scheme requires 33,000 gigawatt-hours (GWh) of renewable electricity generation annually from 2021 through 2030, when the legislation sunsets.

== History ==
The original Mandatory Renewable Energy Target (MRET) was announced in 1997 and came into effect on 1 April 2001 under the Renewable Energy (Electricity) Act 2000. The initial target was 9,500 GWh of additional renewable electricity by 2010.

In 2009, the target was increased to 41,000 GWh by 2020, representing approximately 20% of Australia's electricity supply. However, rapid uptake of small-scale rooftop solar created an oversupply of certificates, and in May 2010 the government announced the RET would be split into two separate schemes from 1 January 2011.

Following the 2014 Warburton Review, the LRET target was reduced in June 2015 to 33,000 GWh annually from 2021 through 2030, ending almost two years of investment uncertainty.

In September 2019, the Clean Energy Regulator confirmed that enough capacity had been approved to meet the 33,000 GWh target. The target was met on a 12-month rolling basis in January 2021.

== How the scheme works ==
Accredited renewable energy power stations with a capacity generally greater than 100 kilowatts create large-scale generation certificates (LGCs). One LGC represents one megawatt-hour (MWh) of eligible renewable electricity generated and fed into the grid.

Electricity retailers and other "liable entities" are required to surrender a set number of LGCs to the Clean Energy Regulator each year, calculated by multiplying their wholesale electricity acquisitions by the Renewable Power Percentage (RPP). Entities that fail to surrender sufficient certificates pay a non-tax-deductible shortfall charge of $65 per certificate.

Power stations can create LGCs for up to 20 years from the year they first generate electricity. Eligible renewable energy sources include wind power, solar power, hydroelectric power and landfill gas.

== Statistics ==
In the second quarter of 2025, large-scale renewable generation reached a record 27.7% of all electricity in the National Electricity Market, totalling 14.9 TWh. Wind power contributed 7.6 TWh, hydroelectricity 3.7 TWh, and utility-scale solar 3.6 TWh.

A record 14.2 million LGCs were created in the first quarter of 2025, followed by 13.0 million in the second quarter, up 17% year-on-year.

=== LGC prices ===
The LGC market has been in surplus since 2021, when supply first exceeded legislative demand. LGC spot prices declined from approximately $34 per certificate in the fourth quarter of 2024 to around $9 per certificate by the fourth quarter of 2025. Growing voluntary corporate demand for LGCs has partially absorbed the excess supply.

== See also ==
- Small-scale Renewable Energy Scheme
- Renewable energy targets in Australia
- Renewable Energy (Electricity) Act 2000
- Renewable energy in Australia
- Solar power in Australia
