= Marinus Link =

Proposed undersea electricity interconnector

Location
- Country: Australia
- General direction: bidirectional
- From: Heybridge, Tasmania
- To: Hazelwood, Victoria

Construction information
- Cable manufacturer: Prysmian
- Substation manufacturer: Hitachi
- Expected: 2030

Technical information
- Type: Subsea cable
- Current type: HVDC
- Total length: 345 km (214 mi)
- Capacity: 750 MW
- DC voltage: 320 kV

Marinus Link is a proposed 750 megawatt capacity high voltage direct current (HVDC) electricity interconnector, to strengthen the connection between the Australian states of Tasmania and Victoria, on Australia's National Electricity Market. Due to inflation, Marinus link was scaled back from an initial plan of 1500 MW via two cables, down to 750 MW via one cable with negotiations to continue on a second cable.

It involves approximately 250 km of subsea cables and approximately 90 km of underground land cables. Marinus Link will also incorporate significant optical fibre capacity for system control, with the remaining capacity available to strengthen telecommunications and data connectivity between the regions. Marinus Link will be supported by approximately 220 km of high voltage alternating current (HVAC) of proposed transmission developments in North West Tasmania, known as the North West Transmission Developments (NWTD). Collectively, Marinus Link and the North West Transmission Developments are known as Project Marinus. In October 2022, authorities pledged loans for the project, as well as supporting facilities such as pumped hydro in Tasmania.

Stage 1 of the project is expected to commence construction in 2026 with completion in 2030. On 1 August 2025, Marinus Link announced Stage 1 will proceed after final investment decision was made by shareholders. The project received federal environmental approval on 3 August 2025.

== Role of TasNetworks ==
TasNetworks owns, operates and maintains the electricity transmission and distribution network in Tasmania, delivering electricity supply to more than 295,000 residential, commercial and industrial customers, and also provides telecommunications and technology services. TasNetworks is wholly owned by the State of Tasmania and operates as a commercial business with assets of $3.5 billion. As the jurisdictional planner for the state of Tasmania, TasNetworks is progressing Marinus Link and supporting transmission developments.

== Background ==
The first Bass Strait interconnector, Basslink, was constructed between 2003 and 2005, with a capacity rating of 630 MW. Basslink experienced a fault in December 2015, rendering it out of service for six months. The impact of this outage was further compounded by low water levels in Tasmania's hydroelectric power system. After the eventual restoration of service, the capacity rating of Basslink was reduced to 500 MW.

In response to the resulting energy supply challenges, the Federal and Tasmanian governments commissioned a study into the feasibility of a second interconnector in April 2016. The study, often referred to as 'the Tamblyn Report', was conducted by Dr John Tamblyn, and was released in April 2017. The study built on a preliminary report released by governments in June 2016, and recommended that the Tasmanian Government develop a detailed business case for a second Tasmanian interconnector.

== Project timeline ==
=== Initial Feasibility Report and Business Case Assessment Phase ===
The Government of Tasmnaia, with support from the Australian Renewable Energy Agency (ARENA) on behalf of the Federal Government, directed TasNetworks to undertake a feasibility study and business case assessment for a second Bass Strait interconnector, which commenced in 2017, building on the 'Tamblyn Report'. The Feasibility and Business Case Assessment phase of Project Marinus concluded with the release of the Initial Feasibility Report and the Business Case Assessment Report in December 2019. The Initial Feasibility Report showed that Marinus Link and the supporting transmission is technically and economically feasible. The Business Case for Marinus Link is positive and demonstrated that work should continue into the ‘Design and Approvals’ phase, to deliver a ‘shovel ready’ Marinus Link project in time to meet the needs of a National Electricity Market (NEM), which is undergoing a rapid and significant transition to a low emissions future.

=== Design and Approvals Phase ===
The project is currently in the Design and Approvals phase, which includes:

- developing plans outlining how the existing transmission networks and potential new transmission routes will be developed, to increase network capacity and ensure the power system in Tasmania can accommodate future energy developments in the region
- undertaking economic and regulatory analysis of the project
- engaging with landowners and communities to gather feedback which helps to further refine or confirm sections of the proposed transmission routes, through in-person meetings, community information sessions, briefings and webinars
- conducting a range of field investigations, including ecology, cultural heritage and geotechnical surveys
- preparation and completion of planning and approval applications

Progression to equipment manufacturing and construction will only commence once the necessary approvals, funding and pricing arrangements are in place, following a rigorous economic assessment. A Final Investment Decision is expected in late 2023 to early 2024, which would conclude the Design and Approvals phase, with manufacturing and construction to commence shortly after that decision is made.

The Design and Approvals phase included preparing plans and technical designs for the project, conducting economic and regulatory evaluations, reaching out to landowners and communities, and conducting environmental, cultural-heritage and other field investigations. The project made a number of key accomplishments in 2025.

In August 2025, the Australian Government gave environmental approval for Marinus Link and the shareholders of Marinus Link Pty Ltd subsequently made a Final Investment Decision to proceed with Stage 1. The decision paved the way for the project to enter construction. In August 2025, after receipt of the Final Investment Decision (FID), Marinus Link were able to close financial deals and contractors were granted the authority to continue with key works. Construction was to begin in 2026 and Stage 1 was planned to be finished in 2030.

In February 2026, the Australian Energy Regulator granted $3.4706 billion for capital expenditure to build the construction costs of Marinus Link Stage 1. Stage 1 project includes the 750 MW cable link between Tasmania and Victoria, as well as transmission upgrades in north-west Tasmania.

The Design and Approvals phase is timed to proceed in accordance with timeframes envisaged in the Australian Energy Market Operator's (AEMO) 2020 Integrated System Plan.

=== Manufacturing, Construction and Commissioning ===
The original proposal was for a 1500 MW capacity Marinus Link, planned to be built in two 750 MW stages, commissioned two to three years apart, with the first 750 MW stage in service as early as 2027. The second 750 MW of Marinus Link was to be in service as early as 2030.

In September 2023, the project was limited to 750 MW as costs increased to $3bn for that size. Ownership was 49% federal government, 33.3% Victoria and 17.7% Tasmania.

In May 2024, Marinus Link released an update regarding the timing of Stage 2 of the project with the second stage expected to be 2033 subject to market demand.

Following Final Investment Decision in 2025, Prysmian confirmed it had received a notice to proceed.

In September 2025 a contract was awarded to a TasVic Greenlink, a joint venture between DT Infrastructure and Samsung C&T, to build stage 1.

== Economic Analysis ==
The economics and regulation for Project Marinus is assessed under the Regulatory Investment Test for Transmission (RIT-T). The RIT-T is a regulatory mechanism defined in the National Electricity Rules that applies an economic cost benefit test on new electricity infrastructure proposed for the National Electricity Market (NEM).

According to the Australian Energy Regulator (AER): “The purpose of the RIT-T is to identify the credible option that maximises the present value of net economic benefit to all those who produce, consume and transport electricity rules.” The role of the RIT-T is to undertake a cost benefit analysis focusing on different technical solutions by looking in detail at engineering aspects, refining costs, considering alternate options, and staging.

=== Regulatory Investment Test for Transmission ===
The RIT-T assesses the economic and technical impact of, and preferred timing for, all major network investments in the national energy market (NEM). The RIT-T process ensures regulated transmission investment decisions are in the long term interests of customers. The RIT-T process involves multiple stages, and culminated with the Project Assessment Conclusions Report, published in June 2021, which shows that Project Marinus satisfies the RIT-T.

All RIT-T reports and associated documentation have been published on the Marinus Link website.

==== Project Specification Consultation Report ====
The Project Specification Consultation Report was published in July 2018. This report and the feedback it has received has been published on the Marinus Link website.

===== Project Assessment Draft Report =====
The Project Assessment Draft Report (PADR) for Project Marinus was published in early 2020. The PADR takes into account feedback from submissions received during the consultation period following the PSCR’s release. TasNetworks received feedback on the PADR for several months post-release, as part of the RIT-T consultation process, including briefings in Melbourne, Sydney and Hobart in early 2020. Subsequent to publishing the PADR, additional data files were made available which contain detailed information relating to PADR modelling assumptions and results.

==== Supplementary Analysis Report ====
The Supplementary Analysis Report responds to stakeholder feedback received on the PADR analysis and takes into consideration the updated scenarios, inputs and assumptions of AEMO's 2020 Integrated System Plan

==== Project Assessment Conclusions Report ====
The publication of this report marks the culmination of the Project Marinus RIT-T process, which began in 2018 with the publication of the PSCR. The report outlines the project's stakeholder engagement activities, economic and technical analysis and results in the identification of a preferred option that maximises the net economic benefits to the NEM. The cost-benefit analysis undertaken for the Project Assessment Conclusions Report indicates that Project Marinus delivers significant positive net economic benefits to the National Electricity Market from its earliest commissioning timeline of 2027 for the first 750 MW stage, and 2029 for the second 750 MW stage. The independent modelling conducted for the PACR, completed by EY, also supports the establishment of regulated revenue streams for Marinus Link and North West Transmission Developments, with the project providing greater benefits to the NEM than its cost.

=== Wholesale Pricing Report ===
TasNetworks engaged FTI Consulting to undertake analysis on wholesale energy price benefits if Project Marinus proceeds. This work was commissioned in response to stakeholder feedback-seeking information about the customer pricing impacts and beneficiaries of Project Marinus. The independent Wholesale Pricing Report shows that Marinus Link is able to exert downward pressure on wholesale electricity prices because it enhances the NEM’s access to Tasmania’s low cost, high volume dispatchable energy resources including latent hydro capacity, high quality wind resources, and deep energy storage capability.
