= Connect Tasmania Core =

The Connect Tasmania Core is the name used by the Government of Tasmania to refer to a fibre optic communications network linking all major cities of Tasmania to Victoria and the rest of Australia. The government intends to offer access to the network in order to facilitate a more competitive telecommunications industry.

== Components ==
=== TasGovNet ===
TasGovNet is the name of the on-island backbone. It is 420 km long and links the major cities of Burnie, Devonport, Launceston and Hobart. It also links George Town, where it is intended to connect to the fibre optic cables that were laid with the Basslink submarine electricity cable.

The fibre was built by private company Tas21 before being purchased by the Government of Tasmania in 2003 for $23 million.

=== Basslink fibre connector ===
The trans-Bass Strait segment of the network is the submarine fibre optic cable which was laid alongside the Basslink HVDC electrical cable. It will connect to the TasGovNet cable at George Town.

== Partners ==
The Tasmanian Research and Education Network intends to use the TasGovNet and Basslink fibre as part of a network to link major educational and research organisations in Tasmania, including the University of Tasmania, TasTAFE, Australian Maritime College and Australian Antarctic Division.

On 21 December 2007, the Tasmanian Government announced Aurora Energy as being the preferred Strategic Alliance Partner to commercialise the government's on-island fibre network.
