= Tamar Valley Power Station =

Power station in Tasmania, Australia

- Country: Australia
- Location: Tamar Valley, Tasmania
- Coordinates: 41°08′24″S 146°54′20″E
- Status: Base load
- Commission date: September 2009
- Owner: Hydro Tasmania

Thermal power station
- Primary fuel: Natural gas
- Combined cycle?: Yes

Power generation
- Units operational: 5
- Nameplate capacity: 388 MW

Tamar Valley Power Station is a $230 million natural gas-fired power station located in Bell Bay in the Tamar Valley, Tasmania. It is owned by Hydro Tasmania, and is immediately adjacent to the decommissioned Bell Bay Power Station, which is also owned by Hydro Tasmania.

The station's total nameplate capacity is 388 MW, and includes four peaking units totalling 178 MW, and one base-load combined cycle unit of 210 MW. The four peaking units are: three 40 MW (total 120 MW) pre-existing (from the Bell Bay Power Station) Pratt & Whitney FT8 Twin Pac gas turbine alternators (Units 101–103), and a single 58 MW Rolls-Royce Trent 60WLE gas turbine alternator (Unit 104) commissioned in May 2009. The base-load unit is a 210 MW Mitsubishi M701DA gas turbine operating in combined cycle mode (Unit 201) which completed commissioning in September 2009. The Mitsubishi's combined cycle capacity of 210 MW includes 140 MW generated directly by the M701 gas turbine, and a further 70 MW generated by the Mitsubishi steam turbine generator set.

At the time of conception, the Tasmanian Government allowed Aurora Energy to enter into long term energy supply agreement with Alinta. During 2008 the Tasmanian Government via Aurora Energy acquired the construction project from the then owner Babcock & Brown Power (who had earlier purchased Alinta Energy generation assets). Aurora set up a fully owned subsidiary company "AETV Power" to complete and operate the power station assets.

On 1 June 2013 the State Government transferred the ownership of the power station from Aurora Energy to Hydro Tasmania, another state owned enterprise, and the predominant generator of electricity in the state.

Following its commissioning, low electricity demand, strong rainfall and substantial use of the Basslink interconnector with Victoria meant that the station generated only small volumes of electricity. In June 2014 Hydro Tasmania commenced the process of mothballing the combined cycle unit, and in January 2015 it sought the Tasmanian Government's approval to sell the unit. In August 2015 Hydro Tasmania announced that the combined-cycle unit was not required for energy security and would be decommissioned and sold. The open-cycle units would be retained for peaking duty. However, only a few months later in December, Hydro Tasmania hired 12 temporary workers at the plant, indicating that the combined-cycle unit may be used again to slow the rate at which Hydro Tasmania's dam storages were depleted.

On 21 December 2015, Basslink, the HVDC interconnector with Victoria, was disconnected due to a faulty interconnector. It was originally expected that Basslink would be repaired and returned to service by 19 March 2016; however, the link was not restored until 13 June 2016. A separate non-cable fault caused another failure of power flow on 22 June. After almost 36 hours power flow was again restored in the evening of 23 June.

Because of the 2016 Tasmanian energy crisis, Hydro Tasmania recommissioned Tamar Valley Power Station to help meet Tasmania's electricity needs.

Rachel Watson, the CEO of Hydro Tasmania, said the power station would be brought online to make up for the loss of the Tungatinah power station following the fire on the evening of 2nd September 2026.

== See also ==
- 2016 Tasmanian energy crisis
- List of power stations in Tasmania
