= Renewable Energy Certificates Registry =

The Renewable Energy Certificates Registry (REC-registry) is an internet-based registry system in Australia for renewable energy certificates (RECs). If an Australian organization installs a green energy installation (solar energy, wind energy, etc.), they can apply for RECs to offset consumption of fossil fuels.

The REC-registry was established by the Australian Renewable Energy (Electricity) Act 2000 (the act), and is maintained by the Clean Energy Regulator.

The REC-registry:

- facilitates the creation, registration, transfer and surrender of large-scale generation certificates (LGCs) and small-scale technology certificates (STCs)],
- tracks the ownership and status of all certificates,
- provides access to the STC clearing house, and
- maintains various public registers as required by the act.

Prior to 1 January 2011, the primary mechanism in the renewable energy target (RET) was the renewable energy certificate (REC). From 1 January 2011 RECs were split into small-scale technology certificates (STCs) and large-scale generation certificates (LGCs). RECs are still used as a general term covering both STCs and LGCs.

All certificates must be created in the REC-registry before they can be bought, sold, traded or surrendered. Participants must hold an account and be registered as a REC-registry user to create, view or transfer certificates.
