= Small-scale Renewable Energy Scheme =

The Small-scale Renewable Energy Scheme (SRES) is an Australian Government initiative that provides a financial incentive for households and small businesses to install eligible renewable energy systems. It is one of two parts of the Renewable Energy Target (RET), alongside the Large-scale Renewable Energy Target (LRET). The scheme is administered by the Clean Energy Regulator through the REC Registry.

The SRES was established in 2011 when the original Renewable Energy Target was split into the LRET and SRES under the Renewable Energy (Electricity) Act 2000. The scheme is legislated to end on 31 December 2030, after which no new certificates can be created.

== How the scheme works ==
When an eligible small-scale renewable energy system is installed, the system owner can create small-scale technology certificates (STCs). Each STC represents one megawatt-hour (MWh) of deemed electricity generation or displacement.

In practice, most system owners assign their right to create STCs to their installer or a registered agent in exchange for an upfront discount on the purchase price. The Clean Energy Regulator estimates this discount reduces installation costs by approximately 30%.

Electricity retailers and other "liable entities" are legally required to purchase and surrender STCs annually to meet their obligations under the RET. This creates the demand side of the STC market.

== Eligible technologies ==
Six types of small-scale renewable energy systems are eligible under the SRES:

- Solar photovoltaic (PV) systems up to 100 kW capacity
- Solar batteries with 5-100 kWh nominal capacity (eligible from 1 July 2025)
- Wind turbines up to 10 kW capacity
- Hydro systems up to 6.4 kW capacity
- Solar water heaters up to 700 litres capacity
- Air source heat pumps up to 425 litres capacity

All components must be listed on the Clean Energy Council approved products list and installed by accredited professionals. STCs must be created within 12 months of installation.

== STC calculation ==
The number of STCs a solar PV system generates is calculated using the formula:

STCs = System size (kW) x Zone rating x Deeming period (years)

=== Postcode zones ===
Australia is divided into four zones based on solar irradiance levels. Each zone has a rating that reflects average solar output per kilowatt of installed capacity:

Zone	Rating (STCs/kW/year)	Coverage
Zone 1	1.622	Northern Territory, Far North Queensland, northern Western Australia
Zone 2	1.536	Most of Queensland, inland South Australia and Western Australia
Zone 3	1.382	Sydney, Brisbane, Perth, Adelaide and surrounding regions
Zone 4	1.185	Melbourne, Hobart, Canberra and southern coastal areas

=== Deeming period ===
Systems are credited upfront for all the renewable energy they are expected to generate between the installation date and 31 December 2030. As the scheme end date approaches, the deeming period decreases, reducing the number of STCs per installation:

Installation year	Deeming period
2024	7 years
2025	6 years
2026	5 years
2027	4 years
2028	3 years
2029	2 years
2030	1 year

For example, a 6.6 kW system installed in Zone 3 in 2026 would generate: 6.6 x 1.382 x 5 = 45 STCs, worth approximately $1,800 at the Clearing House price.

== STC Clearing House ==
STCs can be traded on the open market or through the Clean Energy Regulator's STC Clearing House at a fixed price of $40 per certificate (excluding GST). The Clearing House operates on a first-in, first-served basis. In the September quarter of 2025, 6.3 million STCs were purchased through the Clearing House, up from 4.8 million in the same quarter of 2024.

== Small-scale technology percentage ==
The small-scale technology percentage (STP) determines the number of STCs each liable entity must surrender annually. For 2026, the STP is set at 11.67%, based on an estimated 24.1 million STCs to be created during the year.

The STP must be set by 31 March each year. Non-binding forecasts project the STP at 10.75% for 2027 and 7.77% for 2028, reflecting the declining deeming period as the scheme approaches its end date.

Solar battery STCs are not included in the STP calculation. The Australian Government purchases all battery-related STCs separately under the Cheaper Home Batteries Program.

== Statistics ==
As of December 2024, more than 4 million small-scale renewable energy systems have been validated with STCs in Australia. Approximately one in three suitable Australian homes now have rooftop solar, generating over 12% of grid electricity.

In the first three quarters of 2025, approximately 229,000 solar PV systems were installed with a combined capacity of 2.3 GW. The average system size in the September quarter of 2025 was 10.4 kW, up from 10.0 kW in the same period of 2024.

== Cheaper Home Batteries Program ==
From 1 July 2025, solar batteries became eligible under the SRES through the Cheaper Home Batteries Program. By November 2025, over 124,000 batteries had been installed with a combined capacity of 2.7 GWh, exceeding the capacity of the five largest utility-scale batteries on the National Electricity Market. The average battery size is 18.3 kWh of usable capacity, with 53% retrofitted to existing solar systems.

The program was expanded in December 2025 from an original $2.3 billion allocation to $7.2 billion over four years.

== See also ==
- Renewable energy targets in Australia
- Renewable energy in Australia
- Solar power in Australia
- Feed-in tariff
- Solar credits
