= 2016 Tasmanian energy crisis =

Power supply crisis in Tasmania, Australia

The 2016 Tasmanian energy crisis was an energy storage crisis in the state of Tasmania, Australia in 2016. Two years of high volumes of energy exported to Victoria via the Basslink HVDC cable, followed by low rainfall, and a fault which rendered the cable inoperable, resulted in record low storage levels in Tasmania's hydro-electric system. This resulted in a number of contingency plans to be enacted by Hydro Tasmania and the Hodgman Government.

== Background ==
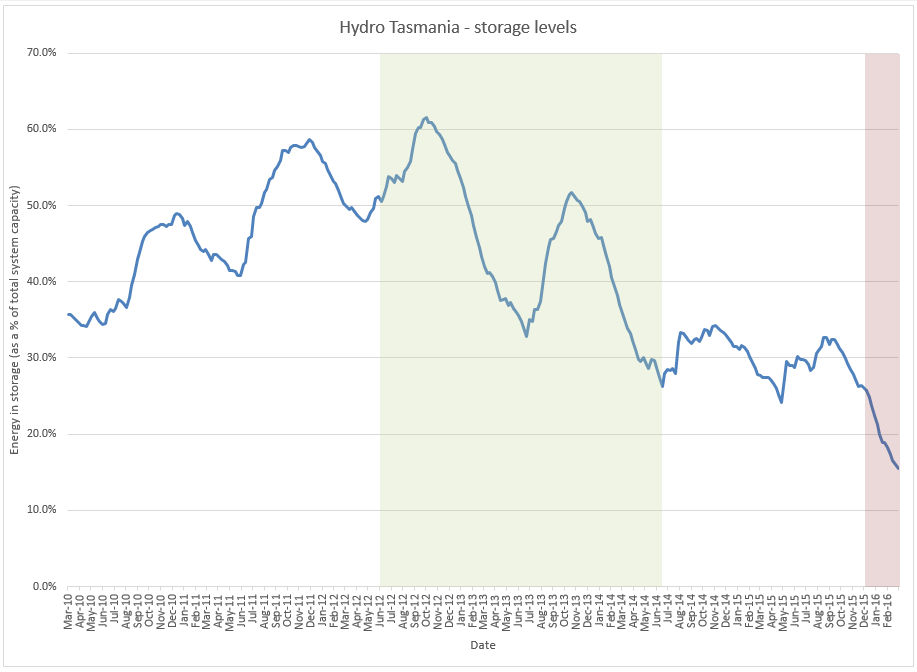
Graph of Hydro Tasmania's system storage levels from March 2010 to March 2016. The blue line represents energy in storage. The shaded green area represents the period where the carbon tax was in place, and the red represents the period when Basslink was out of service.

Tasmania's electricity generation is primarily hydro-electric, having been gradually developed since 1914. As a result, the state is highly dependent on rainfall for electricity generation. An energy shortage in the 1960s resulted in the construction of the oil-fired Bell Bay Power Station. However, this station was only used as a contingency - as of 2015, hydro-electricity continued to be the primary generation method. The state was self-reliant until 2005, when the Basslink HVDC interconnector to Victoria was completed. Basslink was intended to both provide energy security, in case of drought; and provide renewable energy to Victoria, which relies heavily on coal as a fuel source.

Tasmania's reliance on hydro-electricity was further increased by the decommissioning of the Bell Bay Power Station in 2009, and the mothballing of several units of its replacement, the gas-fired Tamar Valley Power Station, including considering selling parts of the station. Conversely, this reliance was reduced in part by the expansion of the Woolnorth Wind Farm in 2007 and the construction of the Musselroe Wind Farm in 2013.

In July 2012, an Australian carbon pricing system came into effect, providing renewable electricity generators with a competitive advantage over greenhouse gas-emitting generators. The Abbott government had promised the repeal of the scheme in the lead-up to the 2013 federal election, in which they were successful. Anticipating that the carbon pricing scheme would be short-lived, Hydro Tasmania capitalised by increasing generation and running down storage levels over the period from July 2012 until the carbon price was repealed in July 2014. Hydro Tasmania's storage levels peaked around 62% in late 2012 before declining to 28% capacity on 1 July 2014. Whereas Hydro Tasmania's target minimum storage levels on 1 July each year was traditionally 30%, in September 2012 it lowered this target to 25%.

Hydro Tasmania's storages did not recover significantly during the second half of 2014 or 2015, despite above average inflows from May to August 2015. Storage levels began dropping sharply from September 2015 due to extremely low inflows; October inflows were just 7% of the long-term average for that month.

== Basslink outage ==
On 22 December 2015, Basslink announced that the HVDC cable had experienced a fault two days earlier (20 December) and was unable to transmit electricity in either direction. The location of the fault was identified as approximately 100 kilometres (62 mi) off the coast of Tasmania. Basslink informed the Australian Energy Market Operator that the interconnector would experience an outage of up to 60 days.

To diagnose the fault, Basslink contracted a range of specialist companies, including cable joiners from Italy and the submarine cable laying ship, Ile De Re. The ship, which typically services communications cables, underwent modifications in the port of Geelong to suit HVDC cables. The problem continued into February 2016, and is considered to be an expensive problem to fix.

On 8 March 2016, Basslink announced they intended to cut the cable within a week and have the cable back in service by late May, with the cable actually being cut on the 11th.

At the end of March 2016, the fault had been identified, and the recovery date for Basslink had been put back to mid June 2016

By the second last week of April 2016, the first stage of the repair was reported as complete Power through the cable was restored on 13 June 2016. After 9 days a separate non-cable fault caused another failure of power flow on 22 June. After almost 36 hours power flow was again restored in the evening of 23 June 2016.

== Response ==
Actions taken to minimise the consumption of water from Hydro Tasmania's storages included:

- Recommissioning of the gas-fired Tamar Valley Power Station
- Striking agreements with three major industrial customers - Tamar Valley smelters Bell Bay and TEMCO, and Norske Skog's papermill at Boyer - to reduce their load by a combined 180 MW
- Deploying up to 200 MW of portable diesel generators
- Bringing Hydro Tasmania's cloud seeding program, usually scheduled to start in May each year, forward by a month

Also at a political level, the unresolved problem seems to have no cross party agreement on the issues. Long term ramifications are also being considered. The prospect of the Basslink connection being lost permanently also is being considered. The dam makers of the early dam making era of Hydro Tasmania also have offered their reflections with no allowance or concession to any of the alternatives that were offered in the 1980s as viable energy generating infrastructure.

On 8 March 2016 Tasmanian Energy Minister Matthew Groom delivered a statement on energy security, summarising the government's actions to date and announcing future steps to manage the energy crisis, including the formation of a Tasmanian Energy Security Taskforce.

The cutting of the Basslink cable also severed part of the internet link to Tasmania.

The state government had considered requesting funding for a second cable, while the fault seeking on the first cable was apparently unsuccessful. The subsequent comments from the Opposition regarding the growing crisis were rebutted as scaremongering. The energy crisis elicited a response for inquiries and examination of issues, including recent Hydro Tasmania management.

=== Issues of residual capacity ===
By March 2016 Tasmanian media were discussing the extent to which Hydro Tasmania would be able to draw upon very low water levels in dams and still create energy from the downstream power stations.

In late March 2016, with no resolution to issues in sight, saw the upgrading of the Tamar Valley Power Station gas turbine capacity

Some commentators saw the crisis as requiring consideration of the issues arising as imperative for the future of Tasmania. Some businesses and business groups took steps to safeguard their power supplies regardless of official pronouncements about power cuts. By late March 2016, Hydro Tasmania was to state lower levels on dam holdings than previously stated and the state of the major dam of the system Lake Gordon had been recorded in its lowest record level leading some commentators to suggest the option of bringing up an issue from some decades before, of the draining of the hydro-dam created new Lake Pedder back to the level of the original Lake Pedder.

=== Energy use ===
Concern of change of weather conditions and potential increased energy usage was noted in March with the Minister for Energy Matthew Groom calling for sensible energy usage.

A series of diesel generators were installed at Meadowbank Power Station, to be part of the apparent short-term solution until June. The ABC News website explanation of the issue of energy use was regularly updated. In April 2016, Hydro Tasmania commenced advertising for conservation of energy by Tasmanians with newspaper advertisements.

== Financial and political impact ==
Regardless of the timeline or subsequent resolution of some of the issues, the impact of the crisis, financially and politically, on banks and the Tasmanian government, was expected to be substantial. However, for industry, there were different expectations in relation to power supply.

=== Outside perspectives and comparisons ===
A few commentators from outside Tasmania tried to put perspective on the issues relative to the larger picture of how political and Hydro Tasmania level decisions affected the current energy issues. Recent Hydro Tasmania board decisions also had been under the spotlight from former staff. Many mainland commentators also focus upon the need to change current policies and practices relative to energy.

=== Blackouts and plans ===
It was claimed in early April that:

“active discussions” for more than three months about enforced blackouts and brownouts

However this did not agree with the public statements of the Minister. Various sectors of the Tasmanian community, as well as regions, were concerned at the prospect of loss of energy available to support their industries.

The explanation of how the issue developed continued in the media in May 2016, as well as delays due to Bass Strait conditions as well as differences as to the explanation of the cause of the break in Basslink. Also rain had raised dam levels.

== Resolution ==
The power crisis was expected to be resolved by the Basslink repair, expected by mid-June 2016, and increased rain for hydro storages. However strategies prior to the resolution involved further utilisation of diesel power units delegated to power stations.

In March 2016 the Minister for Energy stated:

"The Government can't control the rain, the Government can't control the timing of Basslink," he said. "What we can control are contingencies that we can put in place to make sure that we can meet Tasmania's ongoing energy requirements."

In April, there was a suggestion that unseasonal weather in June (18 consecutive clear days on Bass Strait) was required for a successful re-connection to occur, put the question of possible further delays.

On 12 May 2016, the Hydro Tasmania website announced a return to usual practices of hydro facilities:

Over the past week, Hydro Tasmania has stopped all diesel generation and wound back gas to prevent spill in smaller hydro storages because of high inflows. Yesterday, the combined cycle gas turbine (CCGT) at the Tamar Valley Power Station was turned off, as continued high inflows push storages close to spilling at a number of locations.

In the same week, rainfall rates in Tasmania were well above average.

== Senate inquiry ==
Early in 2016, members of the Australian Senate decided to hold an inquiry into the crisis, planned to occur in April 2016. The Tasmanian Minister for Energy's response to the impending inquiry on 14 April was a claim that he had not been asked to attend. The Premier's perspective was to criticise the inquiry as a federal election tactic, in the face of internal documents showing serious concern from within Hydro Tasmania regarding its water levels. The Senate inquiry commenced on 14 April and the Premier advised that Hydro Tasmania staff would not attend:

Mr Groom has said Hydro staff should not be distracted during the energy situation

During the Senate inquiry, a range of issues raised before the committee sat were downplayed by the Minister and government staff. The Tasmanian Treasurer refused to publicly reveal costs of the crisis.

== See also ==
- List of power stations in Tasmania
- 2016 South Australian blackout
