= Tasmanian opium industry =

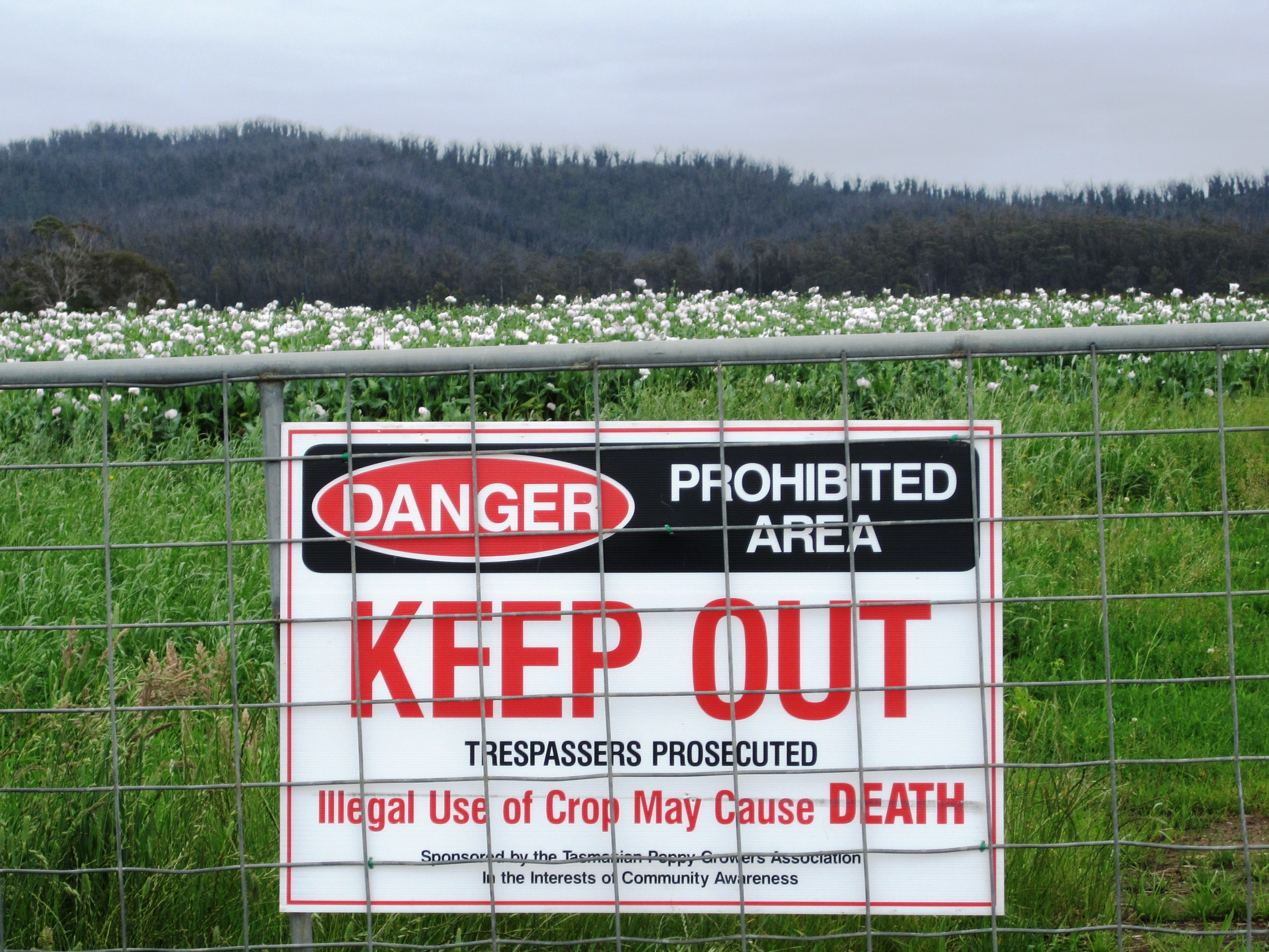
Opium poppies (Papaver somniferum) under cultivation in Tasmania

The Tasmanian opium industry was established in Tasmania in 1966. Tasmania is the world's largest producer of legal narcotic opium, producing more than 50% of the world's supply. Opium produced in Tasmania generally gets produced into opiate medications such as morphine, codeine and oxycodone.

Extractas Bioscience (formerly known as Tasmanian Alkaloids) is Tasmania's largest corporate grower of opium poppies. The father of Jeremy Rockliff, the current Premier of Tasmania worked for Extractas during his life as a poppy producer.

A downy mildew outbreak in the 2014 poppy-growing season led to one Tasmanian company to look into growing poppies in the Northern Territory and Victoria of Australia. Following the outbreak, the Northern Territory Government passed legislation allowing for the supervised production of opium plants for legal wholesale to produce narcotic medications.

Demand for Tasmanian poppy products fell sharply in 2015 following changes in prescription policies in the United States. These changes were made in the wake of the US’s opioid epidemic, which at that point had killed tens of thousands of people. The halting of elective surgeries worldwide during the COVID-19 pandemic in 2020-2021 also dampened painkiller demand, hurting the industry.

The development and popularity of weight-loss drugs like Ozempic in the early 2020s has caused a new spike in demand for processed Tasmanian poppies, which Extracts Bioscience processes into ingredients such as thebaine and oripavine.
