= Bell Bay Power Station =

Former power station in Tasmania

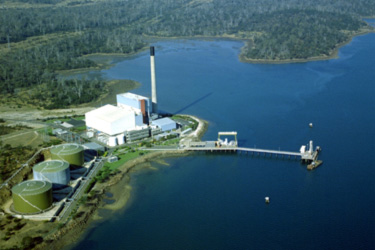
- Country: Australia
- Location: Bell Bay, Tasmania
- Coordinates: 41°8′31″S 146°54′9″E
- Status: Peak demand
- Commission date: 1971
- Decommission date: 2009
- Owner: Hydro Tasmania

Thermal power station
- Primary fuel: Natural gas
- Turbine technology: 2 steam turbines

Power generation
- Units operational: 0
- Nameplate capacity: 345 megawatts (463,000 hp)

The Bell Bay Power Station was a power station located in Bell Bay, on the Tamar River, Tasmania, Australia, adjacent to the Tamar Valley Power Station, with which it was often confused. It was commissioned between 1971 and 1974 as an oil fired thermal power station, and was converted to natural gas in 2003, after the commissioning of the Tasmanian Gas Pipeline, a submarine gas pipeline which transports natural gas from Longford, Victoria, under Bass Strait, to Bell Bay, Tasmania. As the power station's primary role was to provide system security in the event of drought for Tasmania's predominantly hydro-electric based generation system it only was rarely called on to operate, resulting in intervals of five to eight years between periods of significant use. After the commissioning of Basslink in 2006, the power station was decommissioned in 2009.

At the time of decommissioning, it had two 120 megawatts (160,000 hp) gas fired steam turbines and three 35 megawatts (47,000 hp) gas turbines, giving a total capacity of 345 megawatts (463,000 hp) of electricity. After the Bell Bay Power Station was decommissioned, the three smaller units became part of the Tamar Valley Power Station.

== History ==
In response to a prolonged dry period in Tasmania in 1967 and 1968, the Hydro Electric Commission sought to diversify Tasmania's electricity supply away from hydroelectricity. This resulted in the first unit of the Bell Bay Power Station being commissioned in 1971: a single 120 megawatts (160,000 hp) oil-fired Babcock & Wilcox, single drum, reheat boiler, supplying steam to a CA Parsons & Company steam turbine with hydrogen cooled generator (unit one). In 1974, a second near identical unit followed (unit two). Cooling water was via a once-through cooling system, drawing water directly from the Tamar River. Three 15,000 tonnes (17,000 tons) capacity fuel oil tanks supplied the 600 tonnes (660 tons) of fuel oil per day required to run each of the steam sets. Fuel oil was delivered by tank ship and discharged across a dedicated oil jetty at the site. The 110-metre (360 ft) tall stack is a distinctive feature in the area.

The Tasmanian Gas Pipeline, a submarine gas pipeline which transports natural gas from the Esso natural gas plant at Longford, Victoria, under Bass Strait, to Bell Bay, Tasmania, was commissioned in 2002. In 2003, unit one was converted from fuel oil to natural gas, and Unit two was converted in 2004.

In 2006, three Pratt & Whitney FT8 Twin Pac open cycle gas turbine units were acquired from an existing facility in the US. These open cycle units were installed at a site adjacent to the original Bell Bay Power Station.

The Basslink electricity interconnector, which linked the electricity grids of mainland Australia and Tasmania from April 2006, secured Tasmania from reliance on hydro-electric based generation in the event of drought.

In September 2025, the power station's control room was demolished with explosives, followed by the boiler house the following month. The smokestack was left standing until its demolition on 12 January 2026 using 41 kilograms worth of explosives.

== Ownership ==
Bell Bay Power Station was owned by Hydro Tasmania.

In March 2007, Alinta agreed to buy the peaking plant site from Hydro Tasmania for $75 million, which included gas pipeline capacity agreements. This would complement its proposed 200 MW combined cycle Tamar Valley Power Station, which was due for completion in early 2009, and which was to be located somewhere in the Bell Bay precinct.

Aurora Energy acquired the ex Alinta Energy combined cycle power station project and the peaking plant from Babcock & Brown Power in September 2008. The Tasmanian Government included a possible transfer of the existing Bell Bay Power Station to Aurora Energy as part of the acquisition. The transfer of the existing two thermal units did not proceed. Hydro Tasmania remained the owner and the station is currently available for sale whole or as parts.
