= Mersey Valley, Tasmania =

Valley in Tasmania, Australia

Mersey Valley
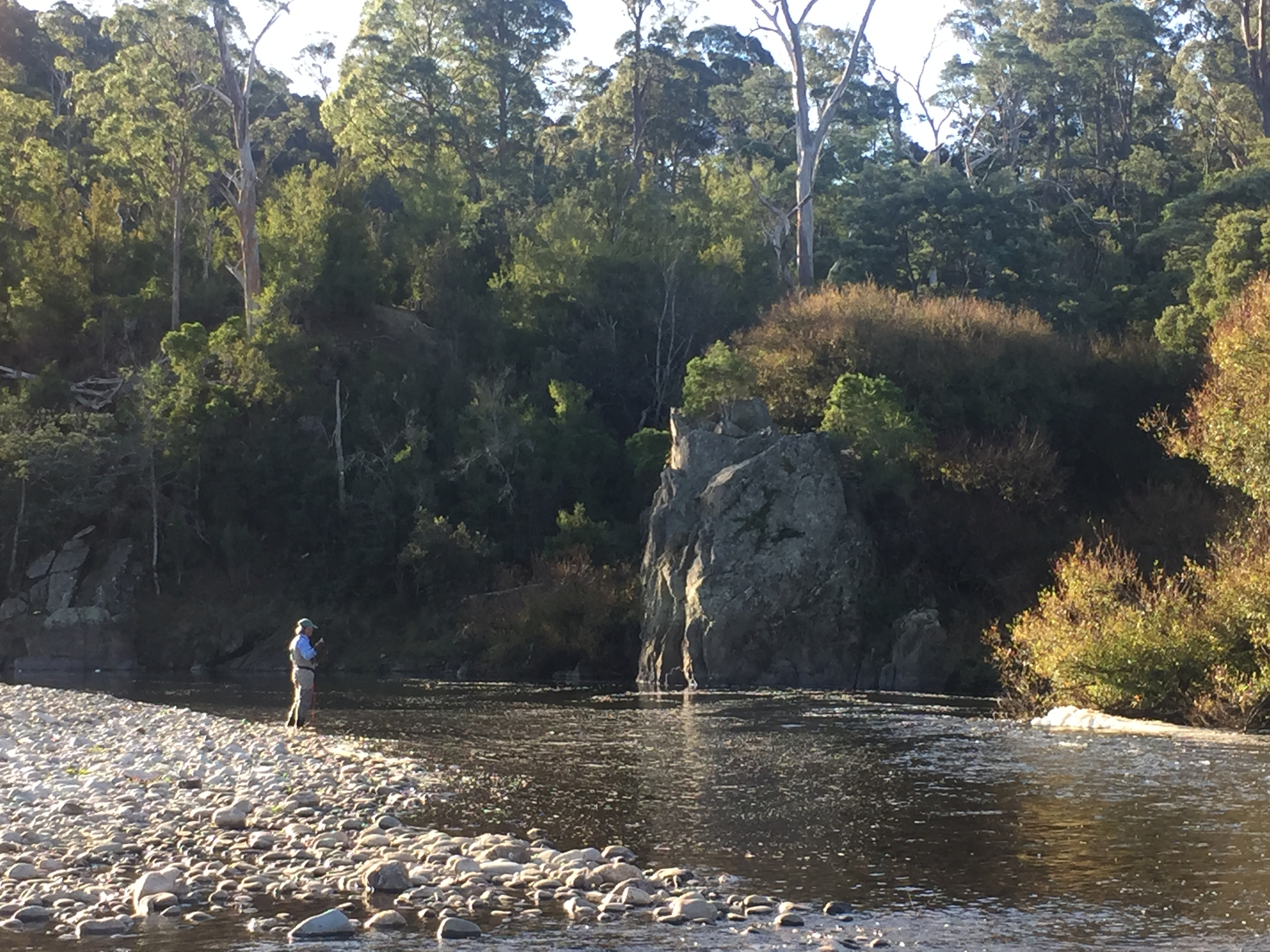
- The Mersey River, which flows through the valley.

- Location within Tasmania
- Area: 3,000 km^{2} (1,200 sq mi)

Geography
- Location: Tasmania, Australia
- Population centers: Devonport, Latrobe, Sheffield
- Coordinates: 41.5°S 146.5°E
- Rivers: Mersey River
- Interactive map of Mersey Valley

The Mersey Valley is a valley and geographic area in the northern region of Tasmania, Australia. It is named after the Mersey River, which flows through its length, providing a focal point for agriculture, tourism, and hydroelectric power generation. The valley includes the towns of Devonport, Latrobe, and Sheffield.

== Geography ==
The Mersey Valley is situated in Tasmania's northern region, stretching from the highlands of Cradle Mountain-Lake St Clair National Park to the Bass Strait. It encompasses diverse landscapes, including glaciated terrain, fertile farmlands, and rugged mountain ranges. The valley’s defining feature is the Mersey River, which originates in the Central Highlands and flows northward to the sea at Devonport.

The glacial history of the valley is significant, with evidence of ancient ice movement shaping its geography. The valley's upper reaches near Cradle Mountain contain glacial moraines and U-shaped valleys formed during the Pleistocene epoch. These features make the Mersey Valley an important area for studying Tasmania’s geological past.

== History ==
The Mersey Valley has been home to the Panninher people for thousands of years. They utilised the river and its surrounds for fishing, hunting, and cultural practices.

European settlement began in the early 19th century, with timber and mining industries playing central roles. Significant mineral deposits, including lead, silver, and copper, were discovered in the valley, particularly around the Mount Claude and Mount Roland areas. These minerals were extracted in the late 19th and early 20th centuries, contributing to the region's economic growth.

The valley also became known as an apple-growing region in the early 20th century. Its fertile soils and temperate climate supported large-scale orchards, earning it a reputation as a key contributor to Tasmania’s apple exports. While apple production has declined, the area still grows apples and other fruits, including berries and cherries.

== Economy ==
The Mersey Valley has a diverse economy driven by agriculture, tourism, and energy production. Agriculture remains vital, with dairy farming, potato cultivation, and poppy production being prominent industries. The region’s fertile soils and consistent rainfall make it ideal for high-value crops.

Hydroelectric power generation plays a significant role in the valley, with dams and power stations managed by Hydro Tasmania harnessing the Mersey River's flow. These facilities contribute to Tasmania's status as a renewable energy leader.

Tourism is another key economic sector. Attractions such as Cradle Mountain-Lake St Clair National Park, Mole Creek Caves, and the mural town of Sheffield draw visitors. Recreational fishing in the Mersey River and its tributaries is popular, with brown trout and Atlantic salmon among the species targeted.

== Environment ==
The Mersey Valley contains diverse ecosystems, from alpine vegetation in its upper reaches to temperate rainforests and wetlands along the river. The valley is home to endangered species, such as the Tasmanian devil, and efforts are ongoing to protect their habitats.

The region’s forests have been subject to logging and conservation debates. Some areas, such as the Walls of Jerusalem National Park, remain protected under the Tasmanian Wilderness World Heritage Area.

== Transport ==
The Mersey Valley is well-connected by road, with the Bass Highway linking Devonport to other Tasmanian regions. Devonport is also a major gateway to mainland Australia via the Spirit of Tasmania ferries.

== See also ==
- List of valleys of Australia
- Mersey River (Tasmania)
