= Clean Energy Regulator =

Australian climate change organisation

Agency overview
- Formed: 2 April 2012
- Type: Non-Corporate Commonwealth entity and Statutory Authority
- Jurisdiction: Commonwealth of Australia
- Headquarters: Canberra
- Annual budget: Clean Energy Regulator Budget information is located here
- Ministers responsible: The Hon Chris Bowen MP, Minister for Climate Change and Energy; Senator the Hon Murray Watt, Minister for the Environment and Water
- Deputy Minister responsible: The Hon Josh Wilson MP, Assistant Minister for Climate Change and Energy
- Agency executive: David Parker AM, Chair and Accountable Authority
- Parent department: Department of Climate Change, Energy, the Environment and Water
- Website: www.cleanenergyregulator.gov.au

The Clean Energy Regulator (CER) is an Australian non-corporate Commonwealth entity and statutory authority. It is an economic regulator accelerating carbon abatement for Australia, by administering Australian Government schemes to measure, manage, reduce and offset carbon emissions in Australia; and encourage land management practices that improve biodiversity in Australia. It was established on 2 April 2012 by the Clean Energy Regulator Act 2011 (Cth). It is part of the Department of Climate Change, Energy, the Environment and Water portfolio. It is headquartered in Canberra.

The CER is responsible for administering schemes to report on and manage greenhouse gas emissions, including monitoring and enforcing compliance. These include Australia's carbon offsets and credits schemes.

In the 2020s, the body faced criticisms that its carbon offsets were of poor integrity, and that it had not addressed governance problems such as conflicts of interest.

There have been three separate, independent reviews that have scrutinised the Clean Energy Regulator, particularly the ACCU Scheme. These reviews found it to be well administered and achieving genuine carbon abatement.

In 2022, the Independent Review of ACCUs (Chubb Review) found the Scheme settings were sound and recommended some sensible improvements.

The Climate Change Authority's 2023 statutory review found the Scheme is well designed, with robust governance, compliance and enforcement structures.

The 2024 Australian National Audit Office's performance report of the Scheme provided Parliament with assurance of the effectiveness of CER’s regulatory activities in relation to ACCU issuing and compliance, and contract management activities related to ACCU purchases.

Since December 2023, Australian National University Associate Professor Cris Brack has been conducting 6-monthly independent reviews of human-induced regeneration (HIR) projects. These reviews provide additional assurance on the integrity and performance of HIR regeneration projects.

== Schemes ==
The Clean Energy Regulator administers schemes legislated by the Australian Government for measuring, managing, reducing or offsetting Australia's carbon emissions. These are:

- The National Greenhouse and Energy Reporting scheme and the Safeguard Mechanism (established under the National Greenhouse and Energy Reporting Act 2007);
- The Australian Carbon Credit Units Scheme (established as the Emissions Reduction Fund under the Carbon Credits (Carbon Farming Initiative) Act 2011);
- The Renewable Energy Target (established under the Renewable Energy (Electricity) Act 2000);
- The Australian National Registry of Emissions Units (established under the Australian National Registry of Emissions Units Act 2011);
- The Guarantee of Origin Scheme (established under the Future Made in Australia (Guarantee of Origin) Act 2024);
- The Nature Repair Market Scheme (established under the Nature Repair Act 2023).

== Reporting ==
The Clean Energy Regulator’s Quarterly Carbon Market Reports provide a regular view of supply and demand across the carbon markets schemes it administers and explores key factors that influence market performance. The report also provides information on trends and opportunities that may inform market decisions.

The Clean Energy Regulator also previously administered the Corporate Emissions Reduction Transparency (CERT) report. The CERT report was a voluntary initiative that provided companies with a consistent framework for reporting their emissions reduction and renewable electricity commitments. The report was discontinued, following the introduction of mandatory climate-related financial disclosure reporting on 1 January 2025.

== Integrity concerns ==
The Clean Energy Regulator has faced various allegations that its carbon offset scheme does not effectively reduce emissions.

The Emissions Reduction Assurance Committee (ERAC) is an independent body that oversees the Australian Carbon Credit Units (ACCU) Scheme (formerly known as the Emissions Reduction Fund). It has published many reports and papers in response to allegations, addressing integrity standards of the scheme and particular methods.

In 2021, the Australia Institute found that offsets for avoided deforestation do not meet integrity standards. The report found that the total offsets for avoided land clearing were far greater than the amount of land which would have otherwise been cleared. For these offsets to represent real avoided emissions, the institute estimated that the land clearing rate would have needed to be 751% to 12,804% larger.

In 2022, further allegations were made by Andrew Macintosh, the former chair of the body overseeing the Emissions Reduction Fund. Macintosh provided analysis that 80% of the carbon offsets available under the CER's scheme were low-integrity offsets, which did not represent real reductions in overall emissions. These included the CER's three biggest offsetting methods - re-generation of land, avoided deforestation, and a landfill gas scheme. The CER defended the integrity of the scheme.

Ahead of the 2022 federal election, the Labor Party promised an independent review of the integrity of the scheme. After winning power, the Albanese government initiated the review and named Ian Chubb as its leader. The review found that the scheme's methods were sound, and considered that transparency could be improved. However, the review did recommend the CER stop granting offsets for avoided deforestation, due to the difficulty of assessing intent to clear land. Macintosh wrote that the review had failed to produce evidence to back up its analysis, and had ignored the findings of a report it had commissioned from the Australian Academy of Science.

In 2023, the Minister for Climate Change and Energy revoked the avoided reforestation method under the ACCU Scheme.

Since 2022, the Clean Energy Regulator and in particular the ACCU Scheme which it administers, has undergone several independent reviews and ongoing 6-monthly audits of ACCU methods. Overall, these reviews show the ACCU scheme is administered with integrity.

In 2024, it was reported that recommendations from an internal audit identified the CER had failed to manage conflicts of interest and investigations of fraud. It was further reported the CER had intimidated scientists seeking to provide submissions. The Clean Energy Regulator said in response to these claims that 16 of the audit’s 17 recommendations had been implemented, “with the final recommendation almost complete”.

== See also ==
- List of Australian Government entities
- Mitigation of global warming in Australia
- Australian Renewable Energy Agency
