= Basslink =

Electricity connector in Australia

- Map of Basslink

Location
- Country: Australia
- Coordinates: 38°15′45″S 146°36′29″E; 38°24′22″S 147°4′6″E; 41°2′32″S 146°52′07″E; 41°6′53″S 146°53′31″E
- From: Loy Yang Power Station, Victoria
- Passes through: Bass Strait
- To: George Town substation, northern Tasmania

Ownership information
- Owner: APA Group

Construction information
- Construction started: 2003
- Construction cost: $875 million
- Commissioned: 2005

Technical information
- Type: submarine cable
- Current type: HVDC
- Total length: 370 km (230 mi)
- Capacity: 500 MW (670,000 hp) (630 MW temporarily)

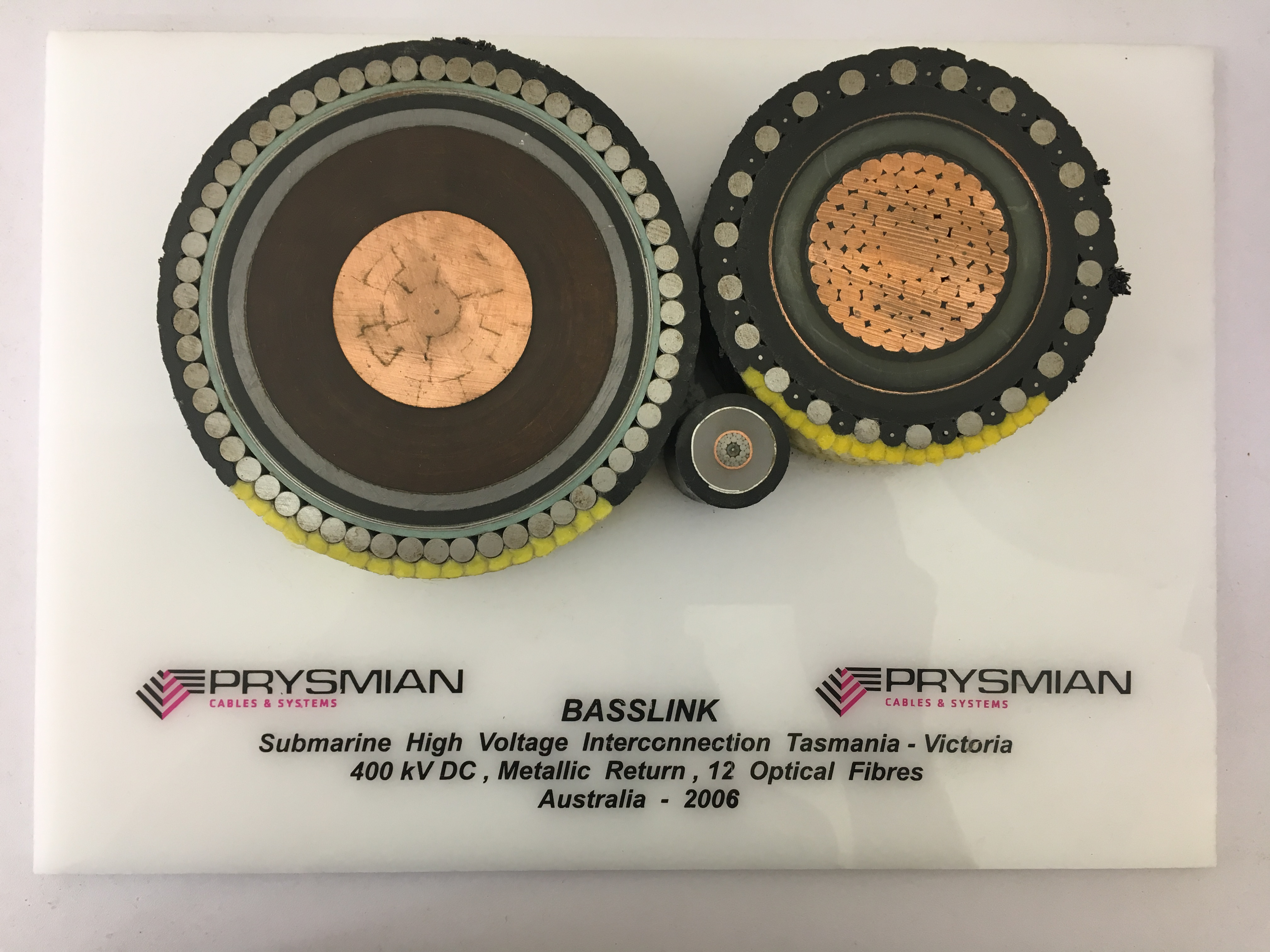
Basslink cross-section

The Basslink (/ˈbæslɪŋk/) electricity interconnector is a 370 km (230 mi) 500 MW (670,000 hp) high-voltage direct current (HVDC) cable linking the electricity grids of the states of Victoria and Tasmania in Australia, crossing Bass Strait, connecting the Loy Yang Power Station, Victoria on the Australian mainland to the George Town substation in northern Tasmania. Basslink is bidirectional and enables Hydro Tasmania to supply some of the peak load capacity to the Australian mainland and take some of the excess power from the mainland when the generation on the mainland exceeds the demand.

Financial benefits from the Basslink investment included reduced or deferred need to invest in further base load generation facilities, and potential to profit from selling peak load power into a market in which prices are generally higher, and because the cable was also used to supply power to Tasmania in times of drought, as most of Tasmania's electricity generation is hydroelectricity. A government review of Basslink in 2011 found, "Basslink-related costs have been around $130 million ($ nominal) greater than the actual revenue benefits... [However] Taking both direct and indirect sources of value [such as increased energy security in times of drought] together, Hydro Tasmania concludes that over the period 2006-07 to 2010-11 the average net benefit of Basslink to its business is in excess of $40 million per annum". However economist John Lawrence estimated that the 2015-2016 Basslink outage cost Hydro "between $140 and $180 million."

Basslink is owned by APA Group (Australia) after acquisition in October 2022.

== History ==
When the Board of Hydro Tasmania originally entered into a preliminary agreement to build Basslink in 2000, it was projected to cost A$500 million. Efforts to prevent corrosion of pipelines and other factors ultimately meant it cost around A$800m to build.

The interconnector was constructed between 2003 and 2005 as an asset of National Grid Australia Pty Ltd, which itself was owned by UK company National Grid plc.

On 1 December 2005, electrical power flowed across Basslink for the first time, as part of the testing procedure. At midnight on the morning of Saturday, 29 April 2006, the link was officially enabled for commercial trading of energy on the National Electricity Market.

On 31 August 2007, CitySpring Infrastructure Trust, a wholly owned subsidiary of Temasek, completed the acquisition of Basslink Pty. Ltd. group, i.e. a conglomerate of 10 commercial subjects owning the Basslink cable infrastructure, with a total enterprise value of AU$1.175 billion.

Since then, CitySpring Infrastructure Trust has morphed into the Keppel Infrastructure Trust, which is listed on the Singapore Stock Exchange, two thirds owned by the public and one third by Temasek, the $350 billion sovereign wealth fund of the Singapore government.

Basslink derives most of its cashflow from a 25-year term Basslink Services Agreement with Hydro Tasmania, the electricity producer owned by Tasmania, which commenced on 28 April 2006. Hydro Tasmania pays a Basslink interconnector facility fee for the transport of the electrical energy of about AU$70 million p.a. This facility fee is said to have a variable factor linked to the interest rate.

The direction of power is usually from Tasmania to the mainland, but reversed in 2020, due to dry weather causing less hydropower.

=== 2015-2016 outage ===
On 21 December 2015, Basslink was disconnected due to a faulty interconnector approximately 100 kilometres (62 mi) off the Tasmanian coast. It was originally expected that Basslink would be repaired and returned to service by 19 March 2016, but the link was not restored until 13 June 2016. A separate non-cable fault caused another failure on 22 June. Power was restored in the evening of 23 June, after almost 36 hours.

=== 2021-2022 Receivership and Contract Dispute ===
On 12 November 2021, the companies that owned and operated the Basslink undersea power cable between Tasmania and Victoria were placed into voluntary administration. The company owed $A40 million to the Tasmanian state government and Hydro—Tasmania for the 2015 outage.

On 10 February 2022, the Tasmanian Government through Hydro Tasmania terminated the Basslink Services Agreement (BSA) contract. The interconnector cable would remain in service while negotiations continue with the administrators of Basslink to alter contract terms during the period of receivership, with Hydro Tasmania offering a one-month extension of key BSA terms as an interim solution whilst alternative arrangements are discussed. However, this proposed interim arrangement was rejected by Basslink on 16 February 2022.

=== 2022 APA Group Acquisition ===
On 7 September 2022, APA Group (Australia) announced its selection as the preferred bidder for Basslink.

On 20 October 2022, APA Group announced that it has completed acquisition of Basslink for $A773 million.

== Technical description ==
Basslink is a monopolar with metallic return HVDC operating at a nominal voltage of 400 kV DC. The nominal rating of the link is 500 MW (670,000 hp) although it is capable of transmitting 630 MW (840,000 hp) from George Town to Loy Yang for up to 4 hours.

It consists of:

- 290-kilometre (180 mi) long submarine power cable from McGaurans Beach near Giffard, Victoria to Five Mile Bluff (41.0427°S 146.8691°E) above George Town in Tasmania. The cable weighs 60 kg/m. It was the fourth longest submarine power cable in the world but has been surpassed and is now the eighth longest.(North Sea Link at 720 km, NorNed at 580 km, and SAPEI at 420 km are longer).
- 60.8 kilometres (37.8 mi) overhead power line to the Victorian coast
- 6.6 kilometres (4.1 mi) underground cable in Victoria
- 11 kilometres (6.8 mi) overhead line section to the Tasmanian coast
- 1.7 kilometres (1.1 mi) underground cable in Tasmania.

The pylons of Basslink are of an unusual type. They have two asymmetric crossbars with different lengths. The high voltage line is mounted on the uppermost longer crossbar, while the electrode line is carried by the lower smaller crossbar, which projects in the opposite direction.

== Basslink Telecoms ==
The Basslink cable also includes a 12-core fibre optic telecommunications cable, the first non–Telstra operated fibre cable crossing Bass Strait. Basslink Telecoms commenced commercial operation on 3 July 2009 and was officially launched on 16 July. The Tasmanian Government uses it, as well as the TasGovNet fibre backbone, as part of the Connect Tasmania Core infrastructure, to facilitate a more competitive telecommunications industry within the state. The link was also to be used by the now defunct OPEL network.

== Sites ==
- LoyYang Static Inverter Plant: 38°15′45″S 146°36′29″E
- Victorian Cable Terminal: 38°24′22″S 147°4′6″E
- Tasmanian Cable Terminal: 41°2′32″S 146°52′07″E
- Georgetown Static Inverter Plant: 41°6′53″S 146°53′31″E
