= Mackenzie Dam =

Dam and power station in Tasmania, Australia

- Location of the dam in Tasmania
- Interactive map of Mackenzie Dam
- Country: Australia
- Location: Northern Tasmania
- Coordinates: 41°40′45″S 146°22′55″E
- Purpose: Power
- Status: Operational
- Opening date: 1972
- Owner: Hydro Tasmania

Dam and spillways
- Type of dam: Rock-fill dam
- Impounds: Fisher River
- Height: 14 m (46 ft)
- Length: 976 m (3,202 ft)
- Dam volume: 176×10^{3} m^{3} (6.2×10^{6} cu ft)
- Spillways: 1
- Spillway type: Uncontrolled
- Spillway capacity: 515 m^{3}/s (18,200 cu ft/s)

Reservoir
- Creates: Lake Mackenzie
- Total capacity: 20,220 ML (16,390 acre⋅ft)
- Catchment area: 75 km^{2} (29 sq mi)
- Surface area: 29.6 ha (73 acres)
- Normal elevation: 1,114 m (3,655 ft) AHD

Fisher Power Station
- Coordinates: 41°40′24″S 146°16′06″E
- Operator: Hydro Tasmania
- Commission date: 1973
- Type: Run-of-the-river
- Hydraulic head: 603 m (1,978 ft)
- Turbines: 1 x 46 MW (62,000 hp); Fuji Pelton-type
- Installed capacity: 46 MW (62,000 hp)
- Capacity factor: 0.9
- Annual generation: 240 GWh (860 TJ)
- Website hydro.com.au

The Mackenzie Dam is a rock-filled embankment dam across the Fisher River, in the northern region of Tasmania, Australia. Completed in 1972, the resultant reservoir, Lake Mackenzie, was established for the purpose of generating hydro-electric power via the Fisher Power Station, a run-of-the-river hydroelectric power station.

The dam, its reservoir, and the power station are owned and operated by Hydro Tasmania; and are located within the Tasmanian Wilderness World Heritage Area.

== Dam and reservoir overview ==
=== Technical details ===
The asphalt-faced rock-filled dam wall is 14 metres (46 ft) high and 976 metres (3,202 ft) long. When full, Lake Mackenzie has capacity of 20,220 megalitres (16,390 acre⋅ft) and covers 29.6 hectares (73 acres), draw from a catchment area of 75 square kilometres (29 sq mi). The single uncontrolled spillway is capable of discharging 515 cubic metres per second (18,200 cu ft/s).

=== Reservoir ===
Water from Lake Mackenzie flows via canals, tunnels and pipes to the Fisher Power Station. The water descends to the power station and then flows into Lake Parangana.

The area surrounding the reservoir were affected by the 2016 Tasmanian bushfires. Fishing and boating is permitted on the reservoir; and the waterway is dominated by wild brown trout and rainbow trout.

== Hydroelectric power station ==
The Fisher Power Station is part of the Mersey–Forth scheme that comprises seven run-of-the-river hydroelectric power stations and one mini-hydro power station. The second station in the scheme, the Fisher Power Station is located in the river's upper reaches.

The station draws water from Lake Mackenzie, supplemented by water run-off from the plateau and by water pumped from Yeates Creek and Parsons Falls pumping stations. Water flow to the station is via a 6.5-kilometre-long (4.0 mi) flume, siphon and canal and then a 5.2-kilometre-long (3.2 mi) vertical shaft, inclined shaft, tunnel and surface penstock. The water descends 650 metres (2,130 ft) from the lake to the power station and flows 4 kilometres (2.5 mi) before entering Lake Parangana.

The power station was commissioned in 1973 by the Hydro Electric Corporation (TAS) and the station has one Fuji Pelton-type turbine, with a generating capacity of 46 megawatts (62,000 hp). The station output is estimated to be 240 gigawatt-hours (860 TJ) annually, or 16% of Tasmania's electricity annual production. The electricity is fed through an 11 kV air-blast circuit breaker to TasNetworks' transmission grid via an 11 kV/220 kV Siemens generator transformer T1 and a second transformer T2, accepts the station 22 kV output from Rowallan Power Station.

In July 2013, Andritz AG announced that it had secured a contact to support the upgrade of facilities at the Fisher and Cethana power stations. In 2017, additional upgrades were announced, provided by the ABB Group; with further upgrades expected to be completed in 2027.

== See also ==
- List of power stations in Tasmania
- List of reservoirs and dams in Australia § Tasmania
- List of lakes of Australia § Tasmania
- List of run-of-the-river hydroelectric power stations
