= List of power stations in Tasmania =

This is a list of active power stations in Tasmania, Australia. Candidates for this list must already be commissioned and capable of generating 1-megawatt (1,300 hp) or more of electricity.

== Gas ==
=== Gas turbine ===
These gas turbine power stations use gas combustion to generate some or all of the electricity they produce.

Power station	Coordinates	Max. capacity		Turbines	Fuel type	Combined cycle	Ref.
Power station	Coordinates	MW	hp	Turbines	Fuel type	Combined cycle	Ref.
Tamar Valley	41°8′24″S 146°54′20.16″E	210	281,615	5	Natural gas	Yes	

Note that the above three power stations are in fact the same power station listed upon commissioning after conversion to gas and recommissioning after a turbine upgrade. It has been decommissioned since 2009.

=== Gas (reciprocating) ===
These power stations use gas combustion in reciprocating engines to generate some or all of the electricity they produce.

Power station	Coordinates	Max. capacity		Engines	Fuel type	Ref.
Power station	Coordinates	MW	hp	Engines	Fuel type	Ref.
McRobies Gully, South Hobart		1	1,341	1	Landfill gas	
Launceston General Hospital, Launceston		2	2,682	1	Natural gas	
Jackson Street, Glenorchy		1.6	2,146	1	Landfill gas	

== Hydroelectric ==
These hydroelectric power stations use the flow of water to generate some or all of the electricity they produce.

Power station	River/lake	Coordinates	Max. capacity		Turbines	Type	Ref.
Power station	River/lake	Coordinates	MW	hp	Turbines	Type	Ref.
Bastyan	Pieman River	41°44′5″S 145°31′55″E	79.9	107,148	1	Conventional	
Butlers Gorge	River Derwent	42°16′1″S 146°15′42″E	12.2	16,360	1	Conventional	
Catagunya	River Derwent	42°27′8″S 146°35′52″E	48	64,369	2	ROR	
Cethana	Lake Cethana	41°28′47″S 146°8′1″E	90	120,692	1	Conventional	
Cluny	River Derwent	42°30′23″S 146°40′52″E	17	22,797	1	Conventional	
Devils Gate	Lake Barrington	41°21′1″S 146°15′48″E	60	80,461	1	Conventional	
Fisher	Fisher River	41°40′24″S 146°16′06″E	43.2	57,932	1	Conventional	
Gordon	Gordon River	42°43′50″S 145°58′35″E	432	579,322	3	Conventional	
Huntsman Lake		41°41′30″S 146°37′12″E	1.95	2,615	1	Mini	
John Butters	King River	42°9′17″S 145°32′3″E	144	193,107	1	Conventional	
Lake Echo	River Derwent	42°15′13″S 146°37′13″E	32.4	43,449	1	Conventional	
Lake Margaret	Lake Margaret	41°59′24″S 145°34′48″E	8.40	11,265	1	Conventional	
Lemonthyme	Lake Parangana	41°36′14″S 146°08′19″E	51	68,392	1	Conventional	
Liapootah	River Derwent	42°22′35″S 146°30′36″E	87.3	117,071	3	ROR	
Mackintosh	Pieman River	41°41′56″S 145°38′36″E	79.9	107,148	1	Conventional	
Meadowbank	River Derwent	42°36′46″S 146°50′39″E	40	53,641	1	ROR	
Midlands		42°6′42.86″S 147°18′24.64″E	6	8,046	1	Mini	
Nieterana	River Derwent	42°15′36″S 146°15′36″E	2.2	2,950	1	Mini	
Paloona	Lake Paloona	41°16′59″S 146°14′56″E	28	37,549	1	Conventional	
Poatina	Great Lake	41°48′42″S 146°55′8″E	300	402,307	6	Conventional	
Reece	Pieman River	41°43′25″S 145°8′10″E	231.2	310,044	2	Conventional	
Repulse	River Derwent	42°30′25″S 146°38′45″E	28	37,549	1	Conventional	
Rowallan	Lake Rowallan	41°43′49″S 146°12′49″E	10.5	14,081	1	Conventional	
Tarraleah	River Derwent	42°18′5″S 146°27′27″E	90	120,692	6	PSH	
Tods Corner	Great Lake	41°48′42″S 146°55′08″E	1.7	2,280	1	Mini	
Trevallyn	Lake Trevallyn/South Esk River	41°25′26″S 147°6′41″E	90	120,692	4	ROR	
Tribute	Pieman River	41°49′01″S 145°39′02″E	84	112,646	1	Conventional	
Tungatinah	River Derwent	42°16′26″S 146°27′42″E	125	167,628	5	Conventional	
Wayatinah	River Derwent	42°25′41″S 146°32′00″E	38.25	51,294	3	ROR	
Wilmot	Wilmot River	41°28′49″S 146°7′23″E	30.6	41,035	1	Conventional	

== Wind farms ==
These wind farm power stations use the power of the wind to generate some or all of the electricity they produce.

Wind farm	Coordinates	Max. capacity		Turbines	Owner	Ref.
Wind farm	Coordinates	MW	hp	Turbines	Owner	Ref.
Cattle Hill	42°09′04″S 146°41′17″E	148.4	199,008	48	Power China	
Huxley Hill	39°56′42″S 143°53′38″E	2.5	3,353	5	Hydro Tasmania	
Musselroe	40°46′50″S 148°01′46″E	168	225,292	56	Woolnorth Wind Farm Holdings	
Woolnorth - Bluff Point	40°43′12″S 144°41′54″E	65	87,166	37	Woolnorth Wind Farm Holdings	
Woolnorth - Studland Bay	40°47′12″S 144°43′21″E	75	100,577	25	Woolnorth Wind Farm Holdings	
Granville Harbour Wind Farm	41°48′ 7″S 145°3′21″E	112	150,194	31	Palisade Investment Partners	

== See also ==
- Energy in Australia
- List of power stations in Australia
