= Wilmot Dam =

Dam and power station in north-western Tasmania

- Location of the dam in Tasmania
- Interactive map of Wilmot Dam
- Country: Australia
- Location: Northern Tasmania
- Coordinates: 41°28′13″S 146°04′21″E
- Purpose: Power
- Status: Operational
- Opening date: 1970
- Owner: Hydro Tasmania

Dam and spillways
- Type of dam: Rock-fill dam
- Impounds: Wilmot River
- Height: 34 m (112 ft)
- Length: 138 m (453 ft)
- Dam volume: 122×10^{3} m^{3} (4.3×10^{6} cu ft)
- Spillways: 1
- Spillway type: Uncontrolled
- Spillway capacity: 1,104 m^{3}/s (39,000 cu ft/s)

Reservoir
- Creates: Lake Gairdner
- Total capacity: 8,820 ML (7,150 acre⋅ft)
- Catchment area: 158 km^{2} (61 sq mi)
- Surface area: 970 ha (2,400 acres)

Wilmot Power Station
- Operator: Hydro Tasmania
- Commission date: 1971
- Type: Run-of-the-river
- Hydraulic head: 241 m (791 ft)
- Turbines: 1 x 32 MW (43,000 hp); Fuji Francis-type
- Installed capacity: 32 MW (43,000 hp)
- Capacity factor: 0.9
- Annual generation: 137 GWh (490 TJ)
- Website hydro.com.au

The Wilmot Dam is a concrete-faced rock-fill embankment dam across the Wilmot River, located near Wilmot, in northern Tasmania, Australia. Completed in 1970, the resultant reservoir, Lake Gairdner, was established for the purpose of generation of hydroelectricity via the adjacent Wilmot Power Station, a run-of-the-river hydroelectric power station.

The dam, its reservoir, and the power station are owned and operated by Hydro Tasmania.

== Dam and reservoir overview ==
The concrete-face rockfill dam wall is 34 metres (112 ft) high and 138 metres (453 ft) long. When full, Lake Gairdner has capacity of 8,820 megalitres (7,150 acre⋅ft) and covers 970 hectares (2,400 acres), drawn from a catchment area of 158 square kilometres (61 sq mi). The uncontrolled spillway has a flow capacity of 1,104 cubic metres per second (39,000 cu ft/s).

In 2013, Hydro Tasmania reported that, downstream of the dam wall, reduced or no flows in the Wilmot River were attributed to both the damming of the river and the diversion of water into the Forth River catchment.

== Hydroelectric power station ==
The Wilmot Power Station is part of the Mersey–Forth hydro scheme that comprises seven run-of-river hydroelectric power stations and one mini-hydro power station. The Wilmot Power Station is the fifth station in the scheme, located above-ground on the foreshore of Lake Cethana, formed via the Cethana Dam. Water stored at Lake Gairdner is transferred east approximately 4.5 km (2.8 mi) to the station via a tunnel and a surface penstock. Water is then discharged from the station into Lake Cethana.

The power station was commissioned in 1971 by the Hydro Electric Corporation (TAS). It has one turbine, with a generating capacity of 32 megawatts (43,000 hp) of electricity. The station output, estimated to be 137 gigawatt-hours (490 TJ) annually, is fed to TasNetworks' transmission grid via an 11 kV/220 kV Siemens generator transformer to the outdoor switchyard.

== See also ==
- List of power stations in Tasmania
- List of reservoirs and dams in Tasmania
- List of run-of-the-river hydroelectric power stations
