= Liapootah Dam =

Dam and hydroelectric power station in Central Highlands, Tasmania

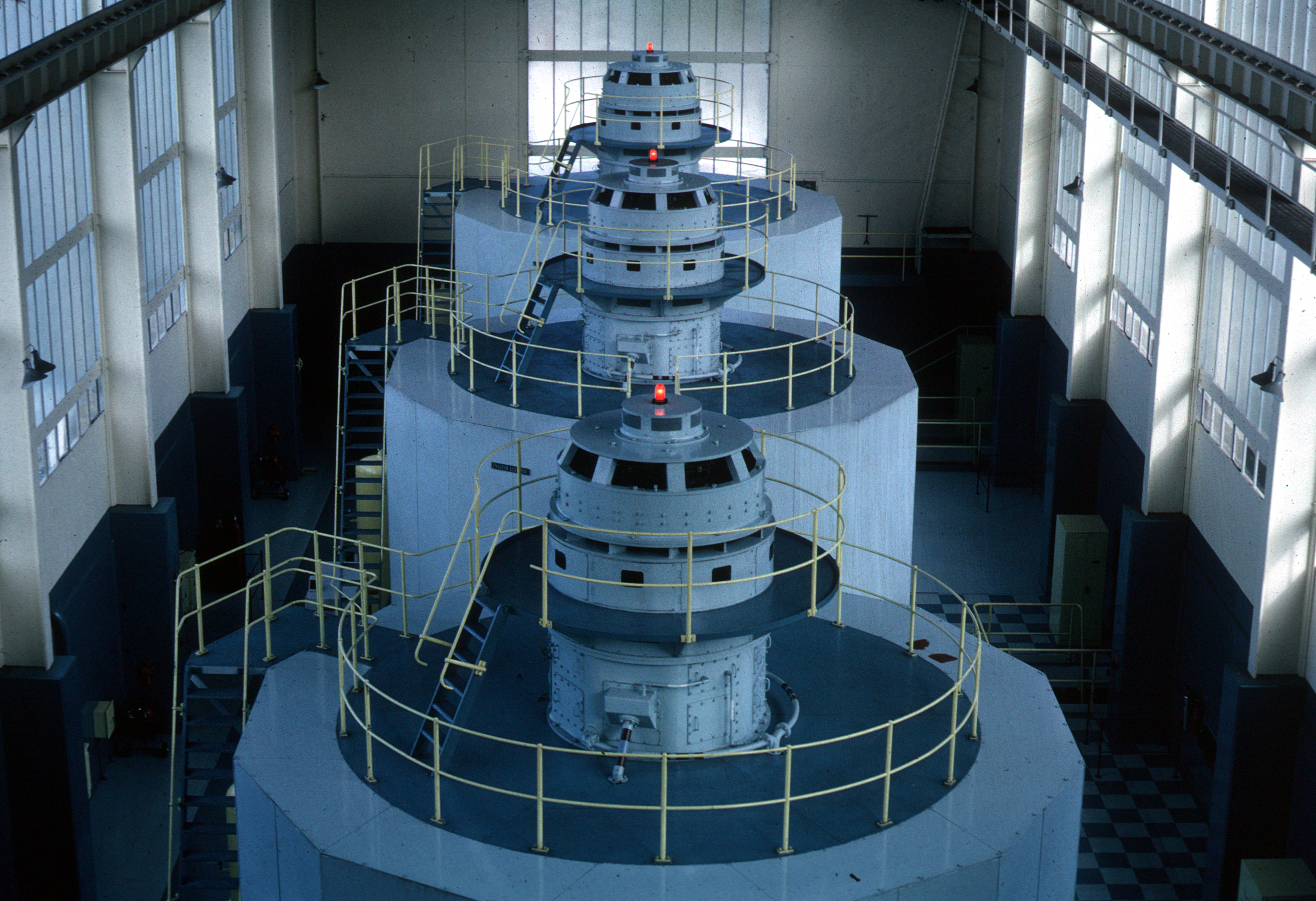
- The power station turbines in 2000

- Location of the dam in Tasmania
- Interactive map of Liapootah Dam
- Country: Australia
- Location: Central Highlands Tasmania
- Coordinates: 42°19′05″S 146°28′21″E
- Purpose: Power
- Status: Operational
- Opening date: 1960
- Owner: Hydro Tasmania

Dam and spillways
- Type of dam: Gravity dam
- Impounds: Nive River
- Height: 40 m (130 ft)
- Length: 110 m (360 ft)
- Dam volume: 37×10^{3} m^{3} (1.3×10^{6} cu ft)
- Spillways: 1
- Spillway type: Controlled crest drum gate
- Spillway capacity: 2,405 m^{3}/s (84,900 cu ft/s)

Reservoir
- Creates: Lake Liapootah
- Total capacity: 1,880 ML (66×10^{6} cu ft)
- Catchment area: 1,227 km^{2} (474 sq mi)
- Surface area: 21 ha (52 acres)

Liapootah Power Station
- Coordinates: 42°18′36″S 146°28′12″E
- Operator: Hydro Tasmania
- Commission date: 1960
- Type: Run-of-the-river
- Hydraulic head: 103 m (338 ft)
- Turbines: 3 x 29.1 MW (39,000 hp) (English Electric Francis-type)
- Installed capacity: 87.3 MW (117,100 hp)
- Capacity factor: 0.9
- Annual generation: 440 GWh (1,600 TJ)
- Website hydro.com.au

The Liapootah Dam is a gravity dam across the Nive River, located in the Central Highlands region of Tasmania, Australia. Completed in 1960, the dam was built by Hydro Tasmania for the purpose of generating hydroelectricity. The resultant reservoir, Lake Liapootah, provides water for the Liapootah Power Station, a run-of-the-river hydroelectric power station.

== Dam overview ==
The concrete gravity dam wall is 40 metres (130 ft) high and 110 metres (360 ft) long. When full, the reservoir has capacity for 1,880 megalitres (1,520 acre⋅ft) and covers 21 hectares (52 acres), drawn from a catchment area of 1,227 square kilometres (474 sq mi). The controlled spillway has a flow capacity of 2,405 cubic metres per second (84,900 cu ft/s). Water from the Derwent below the Tarraleah and Tungatinah power stations is diverted through a 6.6-kilometre (4.1 mi) concrete lined tunnel.

== Hydroelectric power station ==
Part of the River Derwent scheme that comprises eleven hydroelectric power stations, the Liapootah Power Station is the first power station in the lower run-of-river system. The power station is located above ground, below Lake Liapootah.

Lake Liapootah is very narrow and is considered a run-of-the-river storage. During high inflow events the pond level can threaten the Tarraleah Power Station upstream. The drum gate is designed to lower automatically and maintain a maximum pond level below the flood level of Tarraleah station. Having the drum gate installed maximises the head at Liapootah station. The alternative to this would have been to build the dam at a lower level, thus reducing the available output from Liapootah station.

The power station was commissioned in 1960 by the Hydro Electric Corporation (TAS) and the station has three 29.1-megawatt (39,000 hp) English Electric Francis turbines, with a combined generating capacity of 87.3 megawatts (117,100 hp) of electricity. Within the station building, each turbine has a fully embedded spiral casing and water flow is controlled by a spherical rotary main inlet valve and a turbine relief valve designed to prevent spiral casing overpressure. The station output, estimated to be 440 gigawatt-hours (1,600 TJ) annually, is fed to TasNetworks' transmission grid via three banks of 11 kV/220 kV three-phase English Electric generator transformers to the outdoor switchyard.

== See also ==
- List of reservoirs and dams in Tasmania
- List of power stations in Tasmania
- List of run-of-the-river hydroelectric power stations
