= Trevallyn Power Station =

Power station in Trevallyn, Tasmania

Trevallyn Dam
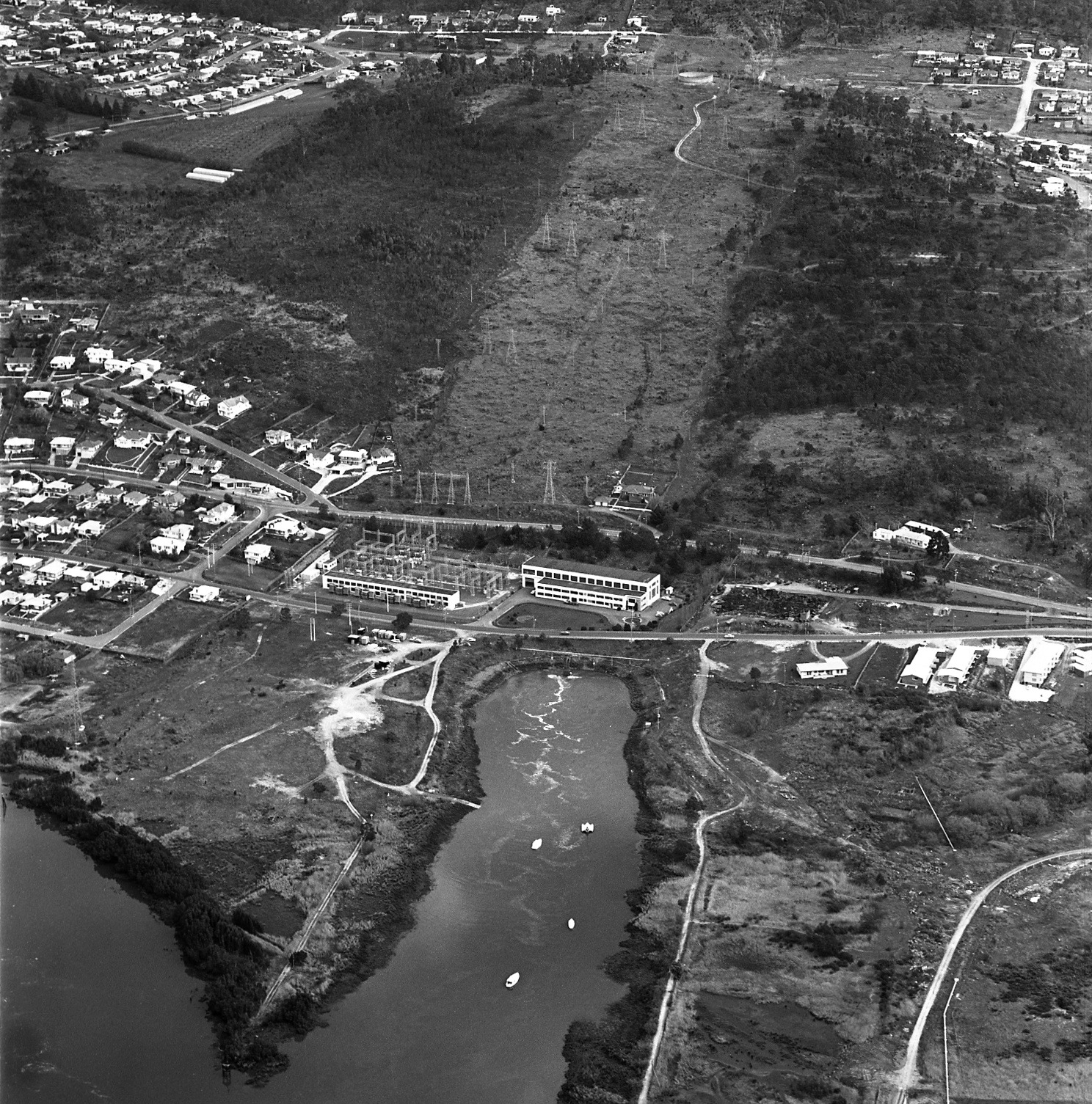
- Trevallyn Power Station (c1970)

- Location of the Trevallyn Dam in Tasmania
- Country: Australia
- Location: Northern Midlands Tasmania
- Coordinates: 41°26′24″S 147°04′48″E
- Purpose: Power
- Status: Operational
- Opening date: 1955
- Owner: Hydro Tasmania

Dam and spillways
- Type of dam: Gravity dam
- Impounds: South Esk River
- Height: 33 metres (108 ft)
- Length: 177 metres (581 ft)
- Dam volume: 61 thousand cubic metres (2.2×10^{6} cu ft)
- Spillways: 1
- Spillway type: Uncontrolled
- Spillway capacity: 8,500 cubic metres per second (300,000 cu ft/s)

Reservoir
- Creates: Lake Trevallyn
- Total capacity: 12,330 megalitres (435×10^{6} cu ft)
- Catchment area: 8,986 square kilometres (3,470 sq mi)
- Surface area: 14.8 hectares (37 acres)

Trevallyn Power Station
- Coordinates: 41°25′12″S 147°06′36″E
- Operator: Hydro Tasmania
- Commission date: 1955
- Type: Run-of-the-river
- Hydraulic head: 130 metres (430 ft)
- Turbines: 2 x 20.9 MW (28,000 hp) English Electric Francis-type turbines; 2 x 27 MW (36,000 hp) English Electric Francis-type turbines
- Installed capacity: 95.8 megawatts (128,500 hp)
- Capacity factor: 0.8
- Annual generation: 492 gigawatt-hours (1,770 TJ)
- Website hydro.com.au/energy/our-power-stations/great-lake-south-esk-0/trevallyn

The Trevallyn Power Station is a run-of-the-river hydroelectric power station located in the northern Midlands & West Tamar region of Tasmania, Australia. The power station is situated on the Great Lake and South Esk catchment and is owned and operated by Hydro Tasmania.

== Technical details ==
Part of the Great Lake and South Esk scheme that comprises three hydroelectric power stations, the Trevallyn Power Station is the final station and is located adjacent to the Tamar River north of Launceston, making use of daily flows down the South Esk River. A dam on the South Esk River diverts water through a 3.3-kilometre (2.1 mi)-long penstock pipeline to the power station. Water flows underground for its entirety except for a short, 100-metre (330 ft)-long portion that leaves the ground near Pitt Avenue due to a valley intersecting the tunnel's course. The pipeline splits underground into four smaller pipes immediately before entering the station's turbines. The water enters the penstock tunnel 130 metres (430 ft) above sea level and leaves the power station at sea level, entering the Tamar River via the Tailrace Bay on Tie-Tree Bend. Trevallyn and Poatina are the only hydroelectric power stations currently located in the drainage basin of the South Esk River. The tunnel through which the pipeline runs is cut through dolerite and was excavated by a French tunnelling company. The bay that the used water is discharged into was excavated using mostly steam driven equipment and tram ways with the two tailing mounds now forming the Tailrace Park (south side) and the Tailrace Convention Center (north side). The Tailrace Bay has been adapted to serve recreational purposed and also provides a safe anchorage for yachts.

The power station was commissioned in 1955 by the Hydro Electric Corporation (TAS), replacing the Duck Reach Power Station. The station has two 20.9-megawatt (28,000 hp) English Electric Francis-type turbines and two 27-megawatt (36,000 hp) English Electric Francis-type turbines, with a combined generating capacity of 95.8 megawatts (128,500 hp) of electricity. Within the station building, each turbine has a fully embedded spiral casing. A main inlet valve is located in the station immediately upstream of each turbine for maintenance and security purposes. No. 1 and no. 2 machines are equipped with a turbine relief (bypass) valve to reduce pressure rise in the turbine and penstock during rapid guide vane closure. The station output, estimated to be 492 gigawatt-hours (1,770 TJ) annually, is fed to TasNetworks' transmission grid via two three-phase Alstom generator transformers and two 3-phase English Electric generator transformers to the outdoor switchyard.

Water is discharged into the Tamar River at sea level by an open tailrace channel.

The construction village, named Marrawaylee, is now part of the suburb of West Riverside and is accessed by Pomona Road. The power station and the open land for the transmission lines now serve as a border between the Launceston suburbs of Riverside and Trevallyn.

== See also ==
- List of power stations in Tasmania
