= Paloona Dam =

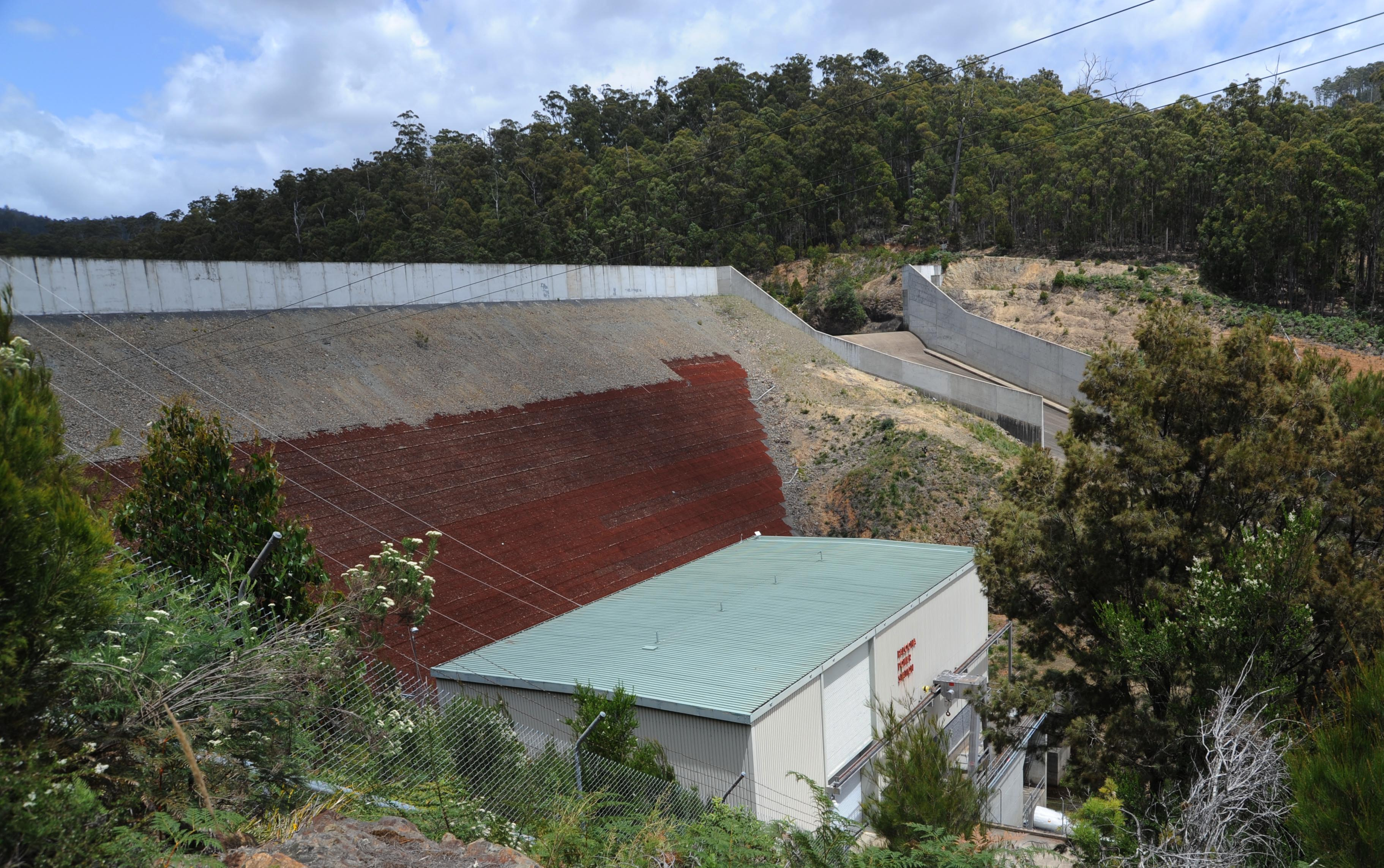
- The power station located below the dam wall

- Location of the dam in Tasmania
- Country: Australia
- Location: Northern Tasmania
- Coordinates: 41°16′59″S 146°14′55″E
- Purpose: Power
- Status: Operational
- Opening date: 1971
- Owner: Hydro Tasmania

Dam and spillways
- Type of dam: Rock-fill dam
- Impounds: Forth River
- Height: 43 m (141 ft)
- Length: 171 m (561 ft)
- Dam volume: 155×10^{3} m^{3} (5.5×10^{6} cu ft)
- Spillways: 1
- Spillway type: Uncontrolled side channel
- Spillway capacity: 2,040 m^{3}/s (72,000 cu ft/s)

Reservoir
- Creates: Lake Paloona
- Total capacity: 19,110 ML (15,490 acre⋅ft)
- Catchment area: 759 km^{2} (293 sq mi)
- Surface area: 17.8 ha (44 acres)
- Normal elevation: 47 m (154 ft) AHD

Paloona Power Station
- Coordinates: 41°16′59″S 146°14′56″E
- Operator: Hydro Tasmania
- Commission date: 1972
- Type: Run-of-the-river
- Hydraulic head: 31 m (102 ft)
- Turbines: 1 x 30 MW (40,000 hp); Andritz Kaplan-type
- Installed capacity: 30 MW (40,000 hp)
- Capacity factor: 0.8
- Annual generation: 151 GWh (540 TJ)
- Website hydro.com.au

The Paloona Dam is a concrete-faced rock-fill embankment dam across the Forth River, located in northern Tasmania, Australia. Completed in 1971, the resultant reservoir, Lake Paloona, was established for the purpose of generation of hydroelectricity via the adjacent Paloona Power Station, a run-of-the-river hydroelectric power station.

The dam, its reservoir, and the power station are owned and operated by Hydro Tasmania.

== Dam and reservoir overview ==
The concrete-face rockfill dam wall is 43 metres (141 ft) high and 171 metres (561 ft) long. When full, Lake Paloona has capacity of 19,100 megalitres (15,500 acre⋅ft) and covers 178 hectares (440 acres), drawn from a catchment area of 759 square kilometres (293 sq mi). The uncontrolled spillway has a flow capacity of 2,040 cubic metres per second (72,000 cu ft/s).

== Hydroelectric power station ==
The Paloona Power Station is part of the Mersey–Forth scheme that comprises seven run-of-the-river hydroelectric power stations and one mini-hydro power station. The final station in the scheme, the Paloona Power Station is located immediately below the dam wall. Water from Lake Paloona is fed to the power station by a short single penstock under the dam.

The power station was commissioned in 1972 by the Hydro Electric Corporation (TAS) with a Fuji Kaplan-type turbine, with a generating capacity of 30 megawatts (40,000 hp). In 2014 the turbine was upgraded to a more efficient Andritz Kaplan-type turbine, which also has a generating capacity of 30 megawatts (40,000 hp). The station output, estimated to be 151 gigawatt-hours (540 TJ) annually, is fed to TasNetworks' transmission grid via an 11 kV/110 kV Siemens generator transformer to the outdoor switchyard.

== See also ==
- List of power stations in Tasmania
- List of reservoirs and dams in Tasmania
- List of run-of-the-river hydroelectric power stations
