= Lake Echo Dam =

Dam and power station in Tasmania, Australia

- Location of the dam in Tasmania
- Interactive map of Lake Echo Dam
- Country: Australia
- Location: Central Highlands, Tasmania
- Coordinates: 42°13′00″S 146°38′22″E
- Purpose: Power
- Status: Operational
- Opening date: 1956
- Owner: Hydro Tasmania

Dam and spillways
- Type of dam: Rock-fill dam
- Impounds: Dee River; Harrys Creek
- Height: 19 m (62 ft)
- Length: 305 m (1,001 ft)
- Dam volume: 160×10^{3} m^{3} (5.7×10^{6} cu ft)
- Spillways: 1
- Spillway type: Controlled
- Spillway capacity: 92 m^{3}/s (3,200 cu ft/s)

Reservoir
- Creates: Lake Echo
- Total capacity: 725,490 ML (588,160 acre⋅ft)
- Catchment area: 100 km^{2} (39 sq mi)
- Surface area: 4,069 ha (10,050 acres)
- Normal elevation: 840 m (2,760 ft) AHD

Lake Echo Power Station
- Coordinates: 42°15′00″S 146°36′36″E
- Operator: Hydro Tasmania
- Commission date: 1956
- Type: Conventional
- Hydraulic head: 168 m (551 ft)
- Turbines: 1 x 32 MW (43,000 hp); English Electric Francis-type
- Installed capacity: 32 MW (43,000 hp)
- Capacity factor: 0.9
- Annual generation: 84 GWh (300 TJ)
- Website hydro.com.au

The Lake Echo Dam is an earth-filled embankment dam across the Dee River, part of the Upper River Derwent catchment, located in the Central Highlands region of Tasmania, Australia. Completed in 1956, the resultant reservoir, Lake Echo, was established for the purpose of generating hydro-electric power via the Lake Echo Power Station, a conventional hydroelectric power station

The dam, its reservoir, and the power station are owned and operated by Hydro Tasmania.

== Dam and reservoir overview ==
The earth-filled dam wall is 19 metres (62 ft) high and 305 metres (1,001 ft) long. When full, Lake Echo has capacity of 725,490 megalitres (588,160 acre⋅ft) and covers 4,069 hectares (10,050 acres), drawn from a catchment area of 100 square kilometres (39 sq mi). The single controlled spillway is capable of discharging 92 cubic metres per second (3,200 cu ft/s).

Lake Echo is one of the main headwater storages for the Dee Lagoon, Bradys, Binney, Tungatinah Lagoon and the Lower River Derwent catchments, releasing water to a further seven stations downstream. Much of the lake is surrounded by steep-sided eucalypt bushland. Access to the rocky shoreline is dependent on the draw-down of water for use in the power station. The lake is stocked with brown trout and rainbow trout.

== Hydroelectric power station ==
Part of the Derwent scheme that comprises eleven hydroelectric power stations, the Lake Echo Power Station is the first station on the Dee River section of the scheme. The power station is located aboveground on the shores of the Dee Lagoon formed below Lake Echo on the Dee River. Water is diverted from Lake Echo by a single 2.5-kilometre (1.6 mi)-long flume and 700-metre (2,300 ft)-long canal. It then descends 168 metres (551 ft) through a single steel penstock to the station with a surge tower located midway along the penstock.

The power station was commissioned in 1956 by the Hydro Electric Corporation (TAS) and the station has one English Electric Francis-type turbine, with a generating capacity of 32 megawatts (43,000 hp). The station building houses a single alternator and the turbine has a fully embedded spiral casing and water flow is controlled via a straight flow main inlet valve and a relief valve designed to prevent spiral casing overpressure. The station output, estimated to be 84 gigawatt-hours (300 TJ) annually, is fed to TasNetworks' transmission grid via an 11 kV/110 kV three-phase English Electric generator transformer to the outdoor switchyard.

An upgrade of facilities at the station was completed in 2022 that included remote monitoring systems.

== See also ==
- List of power stations in Tasmania
- List of reservoirs and dams in Australia § Tasmania
- List of lakes of Australia § Tasmania
