= Pine Tier Dam =

Dam in Tasmania, Australia

- Location of the dam in Tasmania
- Interactive map of Pine Tier Dam
- Country: Australia
- Location: Queenstown, Central Highlands, Tasmania
- Coordinates: 42°06′00″S 146°29′13″E
- Purpose: Power
- Status: Operational
- Opening date: 2 June 1953
- Built by: Macmahon Constructions
- Owner: Hydro Tasmania

Dam and spillways
- Type of dam: Gravity dam
- Impounds: Nive River; Pine River
- Height (foundation): 44 m (144 ft)
- Length: 195 m (640 ft)
- Dam volume: 77×10^{3} m^{3} (2.7×10^{6} cu ft)
- Spillway length: Uncontrolled
- Spillway capacity: 2,432 m^{3}/s (85,900 cu ft/s)

Reservoir
- Creates: Pine Tier Lagoon
- Total capacity: 7,420 ML (6,020 acre⋅ft)
- Catchment area: 736 km^{2} (284 sq mi)
- Surface area: 83 ha (210 acres)
- Normal elevation: 658 m (2,159 ft) AHD

Tungatinah Power Station
- Coordinates: 42°17′49″S 146°27′24″E
- Operator: Hydro Tasmania
- Commission date: 1953 – 1956
- Type: Conventional
- Turbines: 5 x 25 MW (34×10^{3} hp); (Boving Francis-type)
- Installed capacity: 125 MW (168×10^{3} hp)
- Capacity factor: 0.8
- Annual generation: 579 GWh (2,080 TJ)

The Pine Tier Dam is a gravity dam across the confluence of the Nive and Pine rivers, located near Queenstown, in the Central Highlands region of Tasmania, Australia. Completed in 1953, the resultant reservoir, the Pine Tier Lagoon, was established for the purpose of generating hydroelectricity.

The Pine Tier Dam and its reservoir are one of several dams and reservoirs that supply water to the Tungatinah Power Station, a conventional hydroelectric power station. The dam, reservoir and power station are owned and operated by Hydro Tasmania.

== Dam and reservoir overview ==
From the Nive River, most of the water entering the Pine Tier Lagoon is diverted via the Bronte canal to the Bronte Lagoon. Only overflows from the Pine River Dam enter the river, below the dam wall.

Officially opened on 2 June 1953, the concrete dam wall is 44 metres (144 ft) high and 195 metres (640 ft) long. When full, the reservoir has capacity of 7,420 megalitres (6,020 acre⋅ft) and covers 83 hectares (210 acres), drawn from a catchment area of 736 square kilometres (284 sq mi). The uncontrolled spillway has a flow capacity of 2,432 cubic metres per second (85,900 cu ft/s).

=== Reservoir ===
The Pine Tier Lagoon is a popular site for inland fishing, with both brown trout and rainbow trout found in the lake.

North and west of the Pine Tier Lagoon is the Pine Tier Conservation Area, a 1,914-hectare (4,730-acre) protected conservation area, part of the Tasmanian Land Conservancy's Five Rivers Reserve, that links the area with the UNESCO World Heritage-listed Tasmanian Wilderness Area.

== Hydroelectric power station ==
The Pine Tier Dam forms part of the complex of several dams, including the Bronte Lagoon formed by Bronte Dam, Bradys Lake formed by Bradys Dam, Lake Binney and the Tungatinah Lagoon; and a tunnel, canals, pipelines, flumes their associated control gates and a pump station. Together, these reservoirs support the generation of electricity at the Tungatinah Power Station, a conventional hydroelectric power station, situated adjacent to Lake Binney Dam.

== See also ==
- List of reservoirs and dams in Tasmania
