= Meadowbank Dam =

Dam and hydroelectic power station in Tasmania, Australia

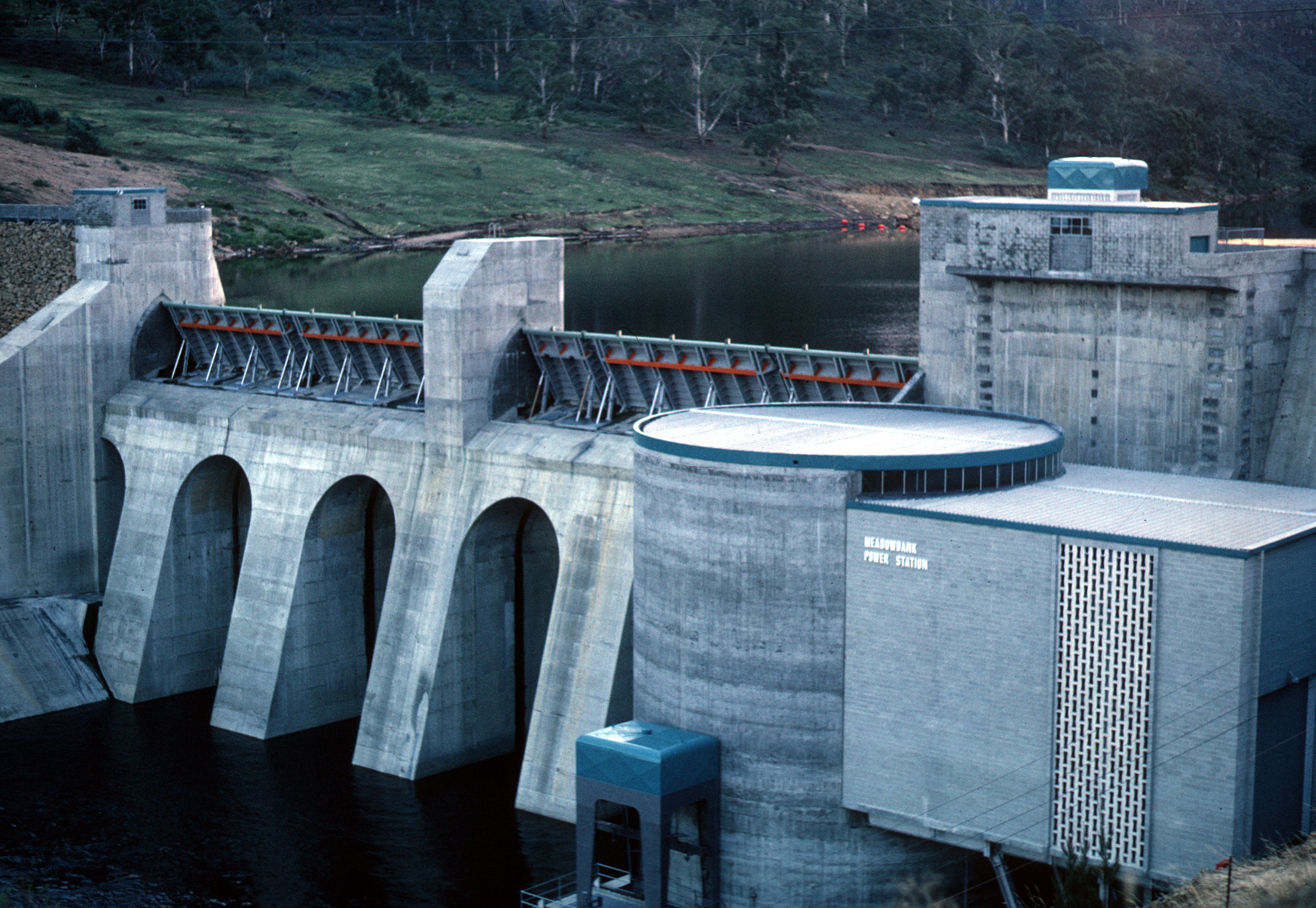
- The power station in 2010

- Location of the dam in Tasmania
- Interactive map of Meadowbank Dam
- Country: Australia
- Location: Central Highlands, Tasmania
- Coordinates: 42°36′40″S 146°50′42″E
- Purpose: Power
- Status: Operational
- Opening date: 1966
- Owner: Hydro Tasmania

Dam and spillways
- Type of dam: Buttress; Embankment
- Impounds: River Derwent
- Height: 43 m (141 ft)
- Length: 265 m (869 ft)
- Dam volume: 86×10^{3} m^{3} (3.0×10^{6} cu ft)
- Spillways: 1
- Spillway type: Controlled
- Spillway capacity: 5,239 m^{3}/s (185,000 cu ft/s)

Reservoir
- Creates: Meadowbank Lake
- Total capacity: 60,000 ML (49,000 acre⋅ft)
- Active capacity: 59,650 ML (48,360 acre⋅ft)
- Catchment area: 6,561 km^{2} (2,533 sq mi)
- Surface area: 600 ha (1,500 acres)
- Normal elevation: 59 m (194 ft) AHD

Meadowbank Power Station
- Coordinates: 42°36′36″S 146°50′24″E
- Operator: Hydro Tasmania
- Commission date: 1967
- Type: Run-of-the-river
- Hydraulic head: 26 m (85 ft)
- Turbines: 1 x 41.8 MW (56,100 hp); Andritz Kaplan-type
- Installed capacity: 43.8 MW (58,700 hp)
- Capacity factor: 0.51
- Annual generation: 187 GWh (670 TJ)
- Website hydro.com.au

The Meadowbank Dam is a buttress dam, with a concrete-faced embankment, across the Lower River Derwent, located in the Central Highlands region of Tasmania, Australia. Completed in 1966 and owned and operated by Hydro Tasmania, the resultant reservoir was established for the purpose of generation of hydroelectricity via the Meadowbank Power Station, a run-of-the-river hydroelectric power station.

== Dam overview ==
Completed by the Hydro Electric Corporation (TAS) in 1966, the buttress dam wall is 43 metres (141 ft) high and 262 metres (860 ft) long; and on its right hand side, the structure has a concrete-faced embankment, both built on a rock foundation. When full, the reservoir has capacity of 60,000 megalitres (49,000 acre⋅ft) and covers 600 hectares (1,500 acres), drawn from a catchment area of 6,561 square kilometres (2,533 sq mi). The controlled spillway has a flow capacity of 5,239 cubic metres per second (185,000 cu ft/s).

== Hydroelectric power station ==
Part of the Derwent scheme that comprises eleven hydroelectric power stations, the Meadowbank Power Station is the final power station in the scheme. The aboveground power station is located near the dam wall. The facilities at the Meadowbank Power Station are simple and include the dam, intake structure with intake gate designed to cut off full flow, a short penstock which is integral with the dam, the power station building, generator equipment and associated facilities.

The power station was commissioned in 1967 by the Hydro Electric Corporation (TAS) with a single Boving Kaplan-type turbine with a generating capacity of 41.8 megawatts (56,100 hp) of electricity. In 2015, the turbine was upgraded to a single Andritz Kaplan-type turbine with a generating capacity of 43.8 megawatts (58,700 hp) of electricity. Within the station building, the turbine has a five-bladed runner and concrete spiral casing. Pre-stressed cables passing through the stay vanes anchor the spiral casing and form part of the station foundation. No inlet valve is installed in the station. The station output, estimated to be 187 gigawatt-hours (670 TJ) annually, is fed to TasNetworks' transmission grid via parallel 11 kV/220 kV Siemens generator transformers to the outdoor switchyard.

Water discharged from the Meadowbank Power Station flows into the River Derwent.

== 2016 energy crisis ==
In 2016, the power station was the location of diesel generators required to supplement the power into the Tasmanian grid due to the 2016 Tasmanian energy crisis and the failure of the Basslink cable.

== See also ==
- List of power stations in Tasmania
- List of reservoirs and dams in Tasmania
- List of run-of-the-river hydroelectric power stations
