= Hydro Tasmania =

Government hydro electricity provider in Tasmania, Australia

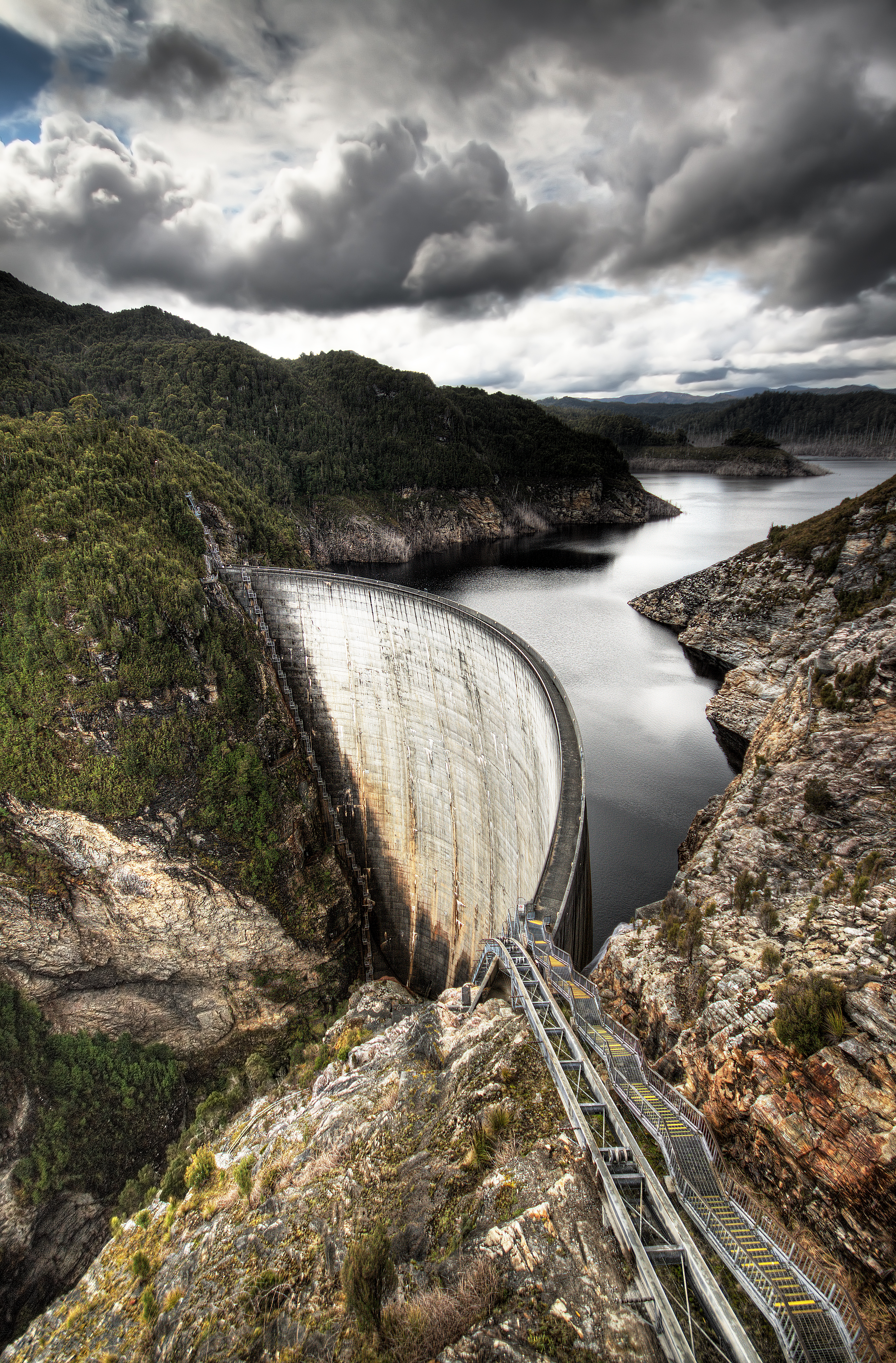
- The 140 m (460 ft)-high concrete arch Gordon Dam, built in 1974; one of the many assets owned and operated by Hydro Tasmania.
- Formerly: Hydro-Electric Commission
- Type: Government enterprise
- Industry: Utilities
- Founded: 1914
- Founder: Government of Tasmania
- Headquarters: Hobart, Tasmania, Australia
- Area served: Tasmania
- Key people: Richard Bolt (Chairman); Rachel Watson (CEO)
- Products: 9,000 GWh of electricity
- Services: Electricity generation
- Operating income: $1.8 billion (2024)
- Net income: $193 million (2024)
- Number of employees: 1,395 (2024)
- Parent: Government of Tasmania
- Subsidiaries: Entura; Momentum Energy
- Website: www.hydro.com.au

Hydro Tasmania, formerly the Hydro-Electric Commission (HEC), is a Tasmanian Government business enterprise which is the main electricity generator in Tasmania, Australia. Originally oriented towards hydro-electricity, owing to Tasmania's dramatic topography and relatively high rainfall in the central and western parts of the state, today Hydro Tasmania operates 30 hydro-electric and one gas power station, and is a joint owner in three wind farms.

== History ==
=== Establishment ===
In 1914, the Government of Tasmania set up the Hydro-Electric Department (renamed the Hydro-Electric Commission in 1929) to complete the first hydro-electric power station, the Waddamana Hydro-Electric Power Station. Prior to that two private hydro-electric stations had been opened the Launceston City Council's Duck Reach Power Station, opened 1895 on the South Esk River (it was one of the first hydro-electric power stations in the southern hemisphere. Reefton Power Station in New Zealand is the first municipal hydro-station, beginning operations in 1888) and the Mount Lyell Mining & Railway Company's Lake Margaret Power Station, opened in 1914. These power stations were taken over by the HEC and Duck Reach was closed in 1955. Lake Margaret was closed in 2006, but after a multimillion-dollar refit was recommissioned in 2009.

=== Dam building era ===
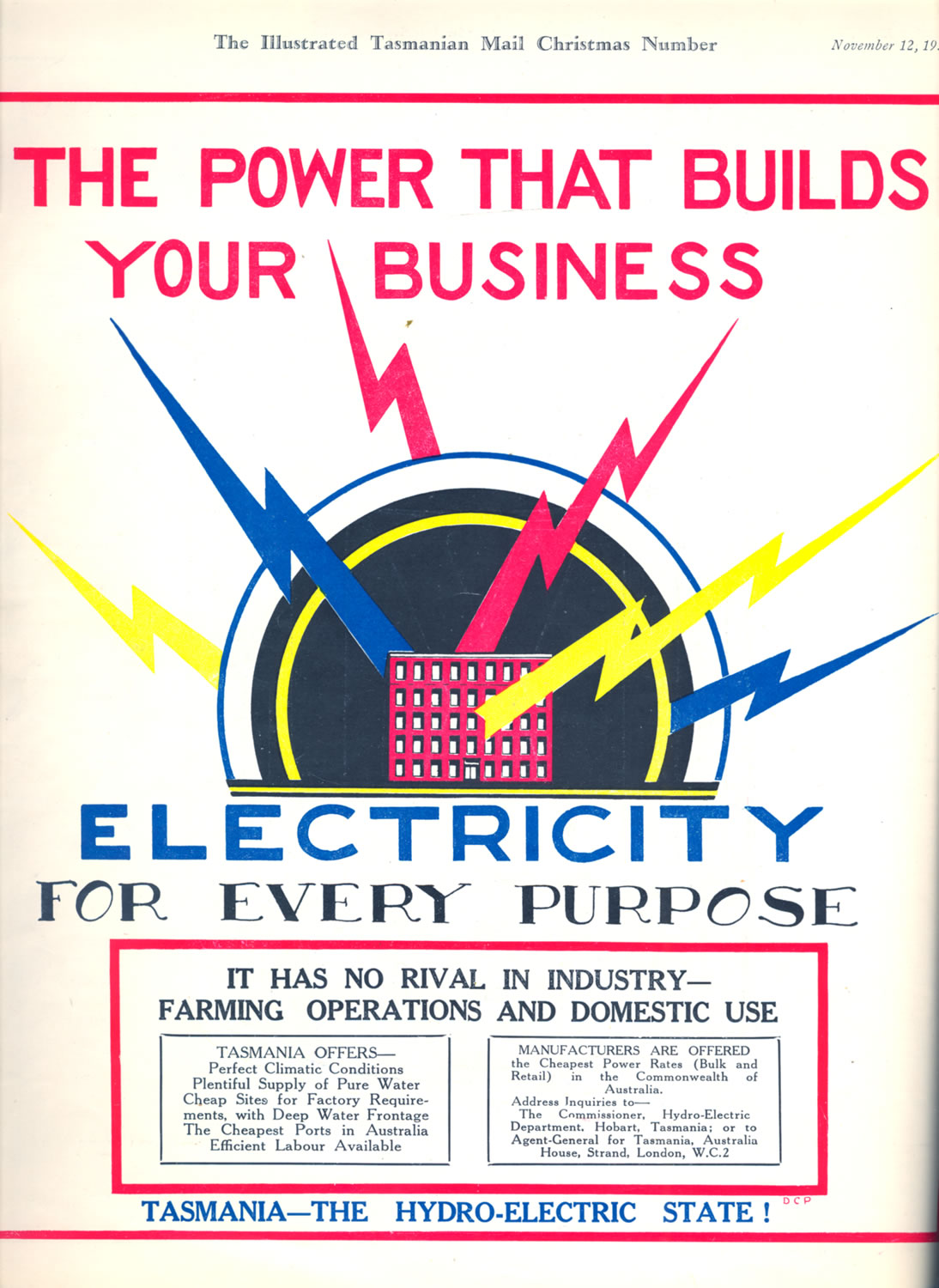
An advertisement by the Hydro-Electric Commission encouraging businesses to Tasmania for cheap power.

Following World War II, in the 1940s and early 1950s, many migrants came to Tasmania to work for the HEC with construction of dams and substations. This was similar to the Snowy Mountains Scheme in New South Wales and similar effects in bringing in a significant number of people into the local community enriching the social fabric and culture of each state. Most constructions in this era were concentrated in the centre of the island.

By the 1970s the HEC was Tasmania's largest public corporation, employing approximately 4000 people, and was tasked with generating as much hydroelectricity as possible in accordance with the Tasmanian government's policy of attracting manufacturing industry to the state with the incentive of cheap power, known as hydro-industrialisation. It was successful, attracting timber and metal processors to the state by offering low electricity prices. However, it also attracted criticism for directing water used for irrigation away from farmers, and for charging higher retail prices than bulk prices.

During this time it was a world leader in rockfill dam building, and pioneered other unique dam building techniques.

The early dams were located in the more accessible parts of the state, including the Mersey River, Forth River and Central Highlands, but after those rivers were exhausted the HEC began to explore the more remote west and south west.

The long-term vision of those within the HEC and the politicians in support of the process, was for continued utilisation of all of the state's water resources, and it received some criticism for not consulting the community or exploring the full context of damming (loss of wilderness, cost-benefit analysis), beyond the search for cheap electricity.

As a consequence of such a vision, the politicians and HEC bureaucrats were able to create the upper Gordon river power development schemes despite worldwide dismay at the loss of the original Lake Pedder. The hydro-industrialisation of Tasmania was seen as paramount above all, and the complaints from outsiders were treated with disdain.

=== Interrupted dam making ===
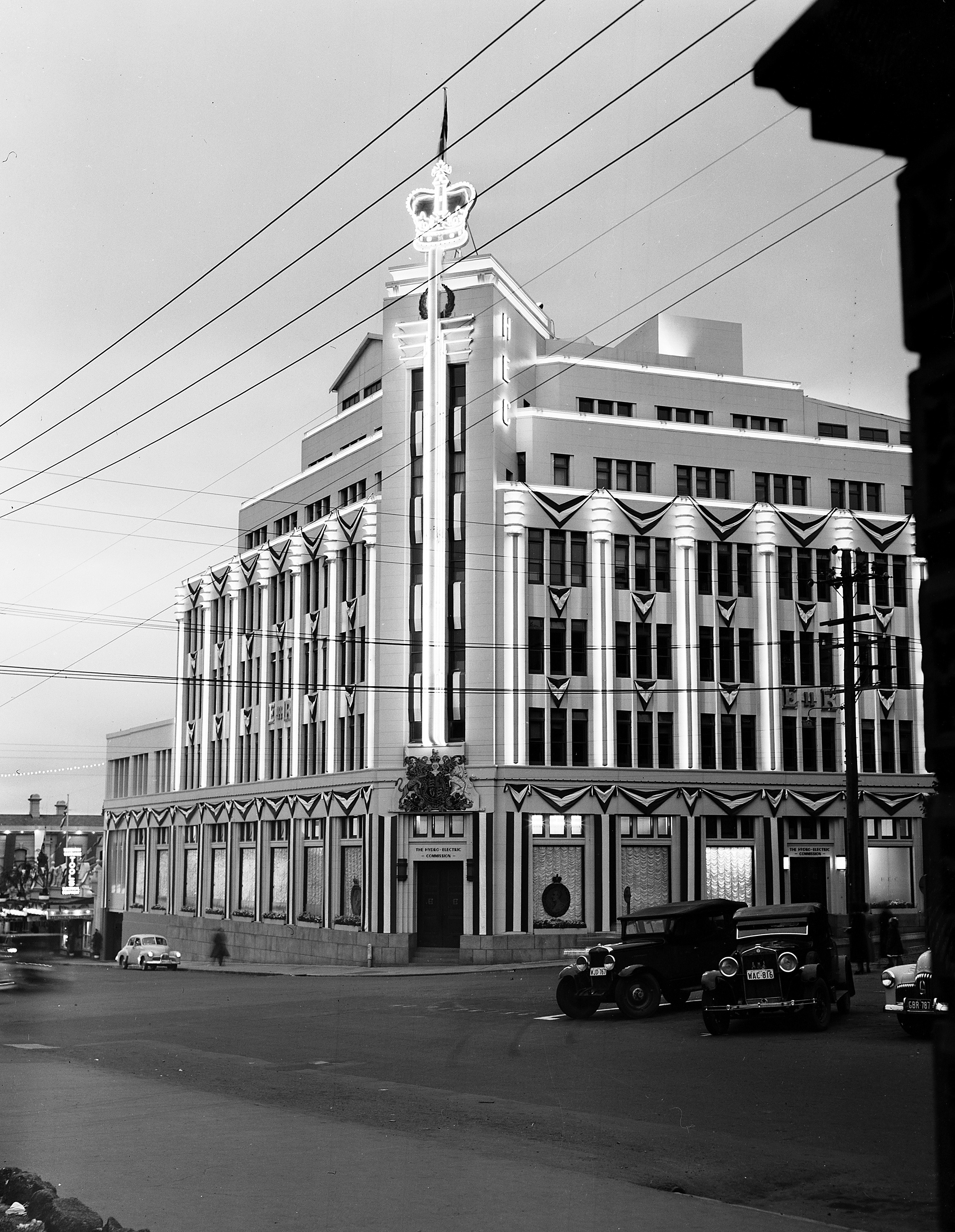
The Hydro-Electric Commission Building, a heritage listed art deco building, constructed in 1938 for the HEC. Shown decorated for the royal visit in 1954

Following the flooding of Lake Pedder by the HEC for the upper Gordon Power Development and the subsequent backlash against the HEC incursions into the south west wilderness of Tasmania, environmental groups of the 1970s and 80s alerted the rest of Australia to the continued power that the HEC had over the Tasmanian environment and politics.

Numbers of Tasmanian politicians either rose or fell on their alignment with the support of the HEC and its power development schemes in the south west and West Coast of Tasmania.

When the HEC proposed a dam on the Gordon River, sited below the Franklin River, there was widespread and vigorous opposition. During the Franklin River 'No Dams' campaign it was common for members of families to be in conflict with one another by being aligned with the HEC proposals or the Conservationists.

The Tasmanian Labor Government attempted to resolve the dispute by offering a compromise dam, sited on the Gordon River above the Olga River, which would have avoided flooding the Franklin River. However, almost no-one wanted this compromise. Conservationists were concerned that the Franklin River area and surrounding wilderness would be damaged, and those in favour of a dam preferred an option that would utilise the Franklin's water as well as the Gordon's water.

The Tasmanian Government then offered a referendum on the issue, which only offered two choices: the Gordon below Franklin dam and the Gordon above Olga dam. There was widespread condemnation that the referendum did not offer a 3rd choice of not having any dam on the Gordon River, and various opinions were offered as to the best way of communicating this at the ballot box. As it turned out, of the 92% of eligible voters to attend the voting booths that day, 47% voted for the Gordon below Franklin option, with the remainder voting informally (45%) or for the Gordon above Olga option (8%). The conservationists were ultimately successful in their campaign to stop any dam on the Gordon River, and the proposal and early works on the Gordon-below-Franklin Dam ended in 1983 when it was blockaded by the environmentalists and the recently elected Liberal State Government lost a High Court challenge to the Commonwealth's powers. The new Hawke government in Canberra had opposed the Franklin dam and had moved to stop its construction.

The compromise between the State and Federal government and conservationists led the HEC to see the end of an over fifty year long dam making enterprise in the construction of the Henty River and King River power developments.

=== The limits reached ===
The conservationists and the HEC in the 1980s acknowledged that there were a limited range of options for further power development schemes, and it was inevitable that the substantial workforce within the HEC specifically employed in the investigation and development of further dams would eventually become redundant.

For a time from the late 1990s HEC water storages were progressively drawn down due to power demand exceeding long-term supply, the overcoming of which was the original reason the Gordon-below-Franklin dam was proposed. It was claimed that the shortfall has been offset first by drawing down water storage and in latter years through increasing volumes of fossil fuel power generation, at first fuelled by oil and more recently by gas and, via the Basslink cable link to Victoria, coal. However, as of 2025 Tasmanian energy demand is matched by local supply because of the introduction of new wind projects in the state, water storages are stable and Basslink imports are matched over the year by exports .

=== From HEC to Hydro Tasmania ===
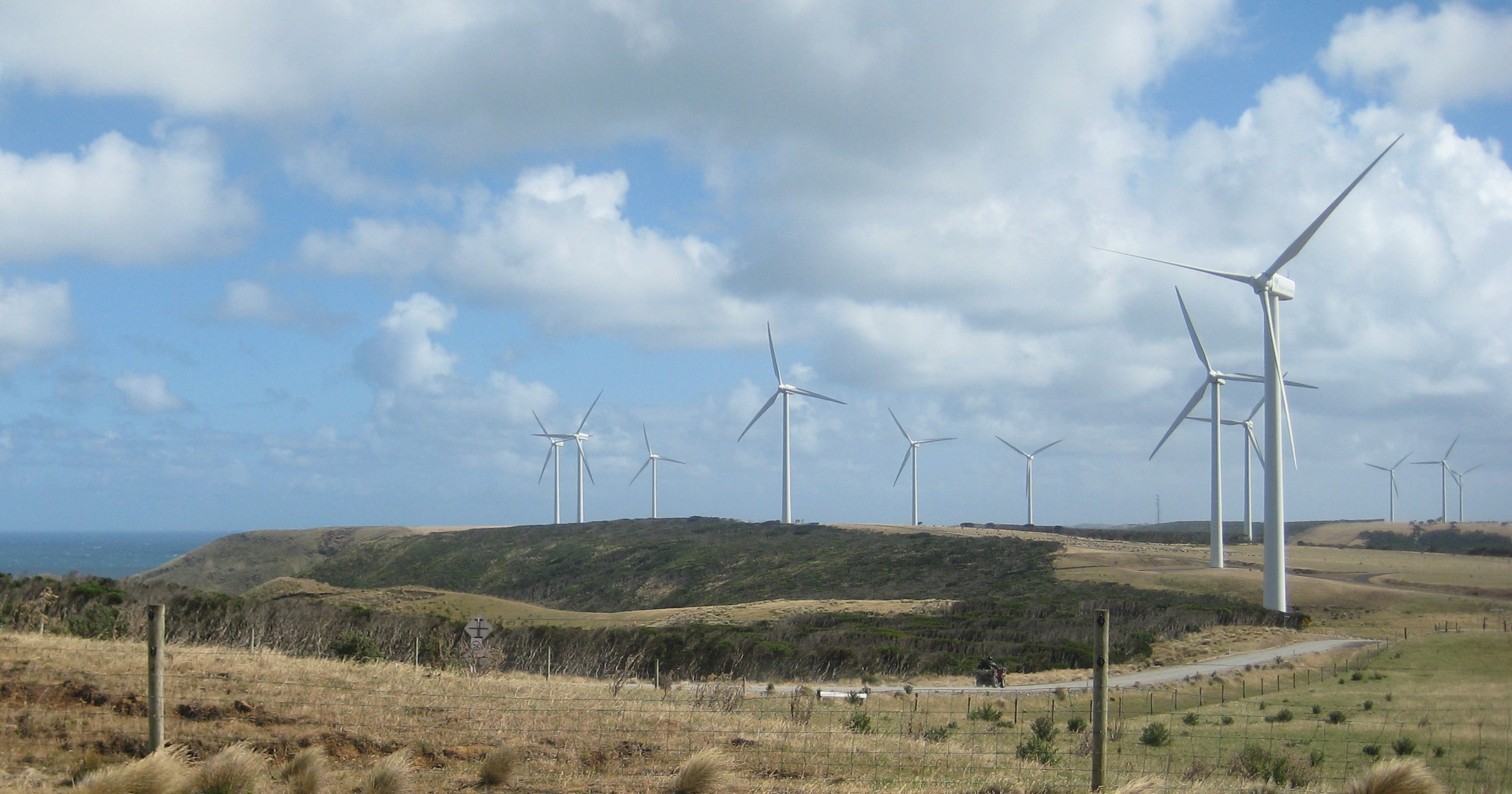
The Woolnorth Wind Farm was commissioned in 2002.

In the early 1990s, eastern state governments prepared for the National Electricity Market (NEM) and electricity deregulation. In anticipation of Tasmania joining NEM, the Hydro-Electric Commission was broken up on 1 July 1998, creating three separate state-owned companies:

- Hydro Tasmania, the electricity generator.
- Transend Networks, the electricity transmitter. Transend has since merged with Aurora's distribution arm to form TasNetworks.
- Aurora Energy, the electricity distributor and retailer, which sells and distributes electricity to customers.

Tasmania joined NEM in May 2005.

Starting from the 1990s, Hydro Tasmania has been investing in wind farms, the first one being the Huxley Hill Wind Farm on King Island, which was completed in 1998. This was followed by two wind farms at Woolnorth with a combined capacity of 140MW. Construction of a fourth power station, the Musselroe Wind Farm with a generating capacity of 168 MW was completed in 2013.

It was argued in support of the privatisation of Hydro Tasmania that it would result in an increase in revenue and an improvement in company efficiency. The Liberals supported privatisation in the 1990s but failed to convince the public of its merits. They have now reversed this policy. The present policy of all three major political parties is against privatisation, and community opinion mostly supports public ownership.

Hydro Tasmania in the 2000s saw the loss of the old dam building generation. The Anthony Power Development, was considered to be part of the last hydro-electric power development in Tasmania. In 2008, the 1,000 GWH Project saw upgrades to parts of existing structures operated by Hydro Tasmania, and on-going progress towards being a carbon neutral operation. In 2020, Tasmania has an annual renewable electricity capacity of 10 TWh, equivalent to its average annual electricity consumption.

== Precipitation crises ==
During a drought, as Tasmania in early 2016 was reaching the lowest water levels ever encountered, there was a fault in Basslink which led to the shutdown of the link to the mainland for about 6 months creating the 2016 power crisis. After Basslink came operational in 2006, the Bell Bay Power Station was decommissioned in 2009, resulting in a reduction of electricity generation capacity of 240 megawatts (320,000 hp), and leaving only Tamar Valley Power Station as a non-hydro power station. That plant had been mothballed and was to be sold when the crisis took place. The plant was recommissioned because of the crisis restoring a capacity of about 200 megawatts (270,000 hp) and diesel generators were brought in from the mainland with a generating capacity of 200 megawatts (270,000 hp).

In the two financial years from mid-2023 to mid-2025, Tasmania had droughts, and Hydro Tasmania water inflow was 6,200 GWh and 6,700 GWh respectively, complemented by a Basslink net import of 1,910 GWh.

== Subsidiaries ==
- Entura is the consulting subsidiary of Hydro Tasmania.
- Momentum Energy is a subsidiary, which was fully owned by Hydro Tasmania in 2009.

== Power Stations ==
=== Gas (thermal) ===
Power station	Coordinates	Max. Capacity (MW)	Turbines	Fuel type
Bell Bay (decommissioned)	41°8′31″S 146°54′9″E		0	natural gas

=== Gas turbine ===
Power station	Coordinates	Max. Capacity (MW)	Turbines	Fuel type	Combined cycle
Tamar Valley	41°08′24″S 146°54′20″E	208	1	natural gas	yes
Tamar Valley	41°08′24″S 146°54′20″E	178	4	natural gas	no

=== Hydroelectric ===
Power station	Coordinates	Max. Capacity (MW)	Turbines
Bastyan	41°44′5″S 145°31′55″E	79.9	1
Butlers Gorge	42°16′1″S 146°15′42″E	12.2	1
Catagunya	42°27′8″S 146°35′52″E	48	2
Cethana	41°28′47″S 146°8′1″E	90	1
Cluny	42°30′23″S 146°40′52″E	17	1
Devils Gate	41°21′1″S 146°15′48″E	60	1
Fisher	41°40′24″S 146°16′06″E	43.2	1
Gordon	42°43′50″S 145°58′35″E	432	3
John Butters	42°9′17″S 145°32′3″E	144	1
Lake Echo	42°15′13″S 146°37′13″E	32.4	1
Lemonthyme	41°36′14″S 146°8′29″E	51	1
Liapootah	42°22′35″S 146°30′36″E	87.3	3
Mackintosh	41°41′56″S 145°38′36″E	79.9	1
Meadowbank	42°36′46″S 146°50′39″E	40	1
Paloona	41°16′59″S 146°14′56″E	28	1
Poatina	41°48′42″S 146°55′8″E	300	6
Reece	41°43′25″S 145°8′10″E	231.2	2
Repulse	42°30′25″S 146°38′45″E	28	1
Rowallan	41°43′49″S 146°12′49″E	10.5	1
Tarraleah	42°18′5″S 146°27′27″E	90	6
Trevallyn	41°25′26″S 147°6′41″E	90	4
Tribute	41°49′01″S 145°39′02″E	84	1
Tungatinah	42°16′26″S 146°27′42″E	125	5
Wayatinah	42°25′41″S 146°32′00″E	38.25	3
Wilmot	41°28′48.5″S 146°7′22.6″E	30.6	1
Total		2272.45	

=== Wind farms ===
Wind Farm	Location	Capacity (MW)	Turbines
Huxley Hill Wind Farm	39°56′42″S 143°53′38″E	2.5	5
Musselroe Wind Farm	40°53′14″S 148°08′28″E	168	56
Woolnorth Wind Farm	40°40′50″S 144°42′02″E	140	62

== See also ==
- List of power stations in Tasmania
