= Transend Networks =

Former Tasmania state-owned enterprise

- Company type: Government-owned corporation
- Industry: Electricity
- Founded: 1 July 1998
- Defunct: 30 June 2014
- Fate: Merged into TasNetworks
- Headquarters: Lenah Valley, Australia
- Area served: Tasmania
- Services: Electric power transmission
- Owner: Government of Tasmania
- Website: www.transend.com.au

Transend Networks was a Tasmanian Government-owned enterprise that was the electricity transmission network provider in Tasmania, Australia from 1998 until 2014.

== History ==
Transend Networks was formed on 1 July 1998 under the Electricity Companies Act 1997 as part of the breaking up of the Hydro Electric Commission. It is owned by the Government of Tasmania

It ceased on 1 July 2014 when merged with the distribution division of Aurora Energy to form TasNetworks.

Transend transmitted electricity from power stations in Tasmania and on mainland Australia via Basslink to its customers around the state. Transend's customers included electricity generators, electricity retailers and major industrial customers.

Transend was a participant in Australia's National Electricity Market that operates on an interconnected power system from Queensland to South Australia. Tasmania is connected to the National Electricity Market via Basslink. Transend was a regulated monopoly that received its revenue cap from the Australian Energy Regulator.

Transend also owned and operated a telecommunications business that served customers in the electricity supply industry and in other industries.
