= Lake Barrington =

Lake Barrington may refer to:

- Lake Barrington, Illinois, a village in the United States
- Lake Barrington (Tasmania), a lake in Australia
