= Lake Binney Dam =

Power station in Tasmania, Australia

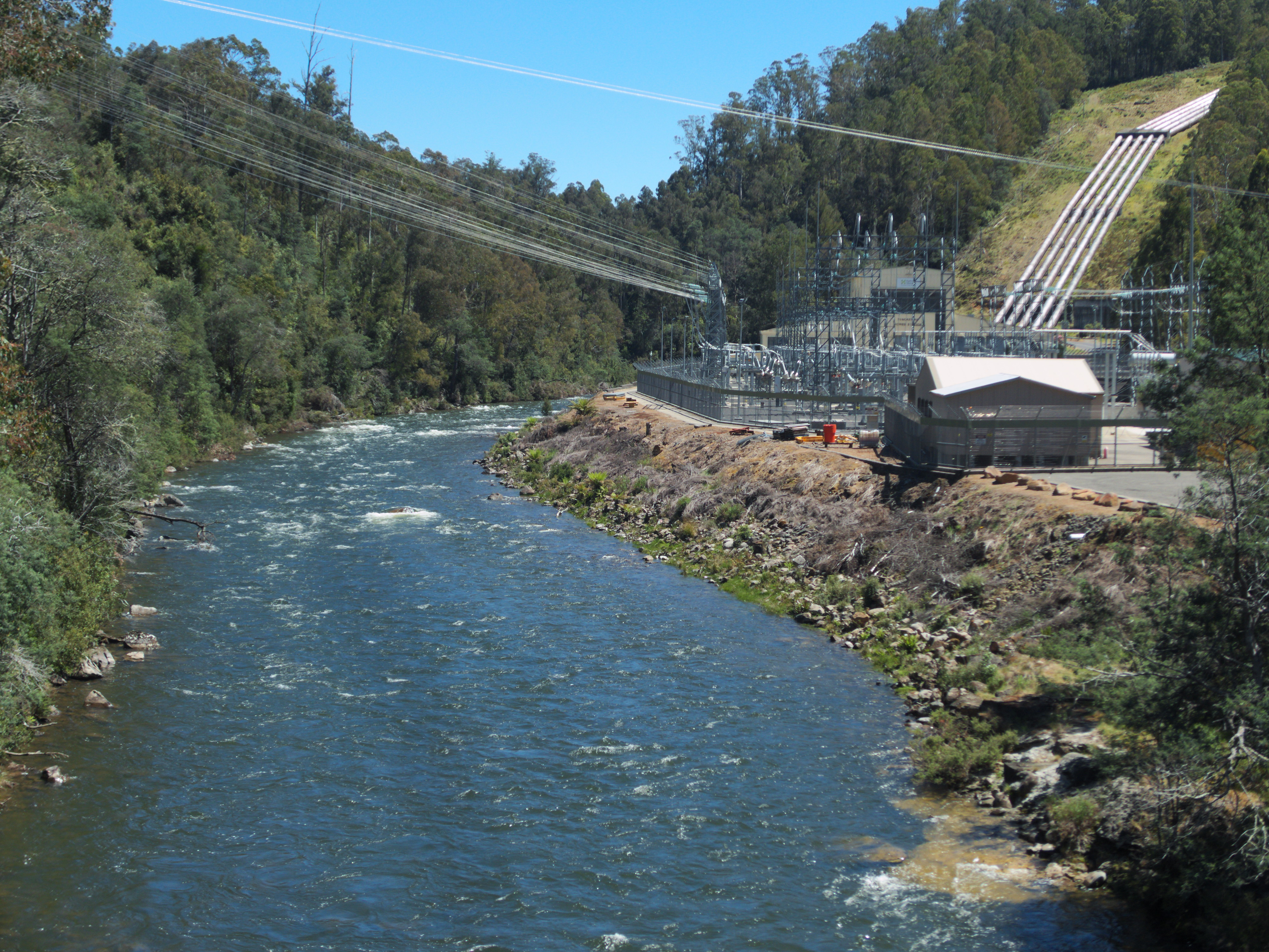

- Location of Lake Binney in Tasmania
- Country: Australia
- Location: Central Highlands, Tasmania
- Coordinates: 42°15′36″S 146°29′24″E
- Purpose: Power
- Status: Operational
- Opening date: 1953
- Owner: Hydro Tasmania

Dam and spillways
- Type of dam: Embankment dam
- Impounds: Big Marsh Creek
- Height: 10 m (33 ft)
- Length: 1,262 m (4,140 ft)
- Dam volume: 192×10^{3} m^{3} (6.8×10^{6} cu ft)
- Spillways: none

Reservoir
- Creates: Tungatinah Lagoon
- Total capacity: 26,420 ML (21,420 acre⋅ft)
- Catchment area: 52 km^{2} (20 sq mi)
- Surface area: 40.9 ha (101 acres)
- Normal elevation: 652 m (2,139 ft) AHD

Tungatinah Power Station
- Coordinates: 42°17′49″S 146°27′24″E
- Operator: Hydro Tasmania
- Commission date: 1953–1956
- Type: Conventional
- Hydraulic head: 290 m (950 ft)
- Turbines: 5 x 25 MW (34,000 hp) (Boving Francis-type)
- Installed capacity: 125 MW (168,000 hp)
- Capacity factor: 0.8
- Annual generation: 579 GWh (2,080 TJ)
- Website hydro.com.au

The Lake Binney Dam is an earth-faced rockfill embankment dam across Big Marsh Creek, part of the Upper River Derwent catchment, located in the Central Highlands region of Tasmania, Australia. Completed in 1953, the resultant reservoir, Lake Binney, was one of the several dams and canals established for the purpose of generating hydroelectricity via the Tungatinah Power Station, a conventional hydroelectric power station.

The dam, its reservoir, and the power station are owned and operated by Hydro Tasmania.

== Dam and reservoir overview ==
The earth-faced rock-filled dam wall is 10 metres (33 ft) high and 1,262 metres (4,140 ft) long. When full, Lake Binney has capacity of 26,000 megalitres (21,000 acre⋅ft) and covers 400 hectares (990 acres), draw from a catchment area of 52 square kilometres (20 sq mi). The dam does not have a spillway.

Lake Binney is part of the Brady Chain of Lakes, a series of lakes and other waterways in the region formed between 1952 and 1956 that, together, collectively support the generation of hydroelectricity at the Tungatinah Power Station. The lake is stocked with brown trout and rainbow trout. Lake Binney is pet-friendly.

== Hydroelectric power station ==
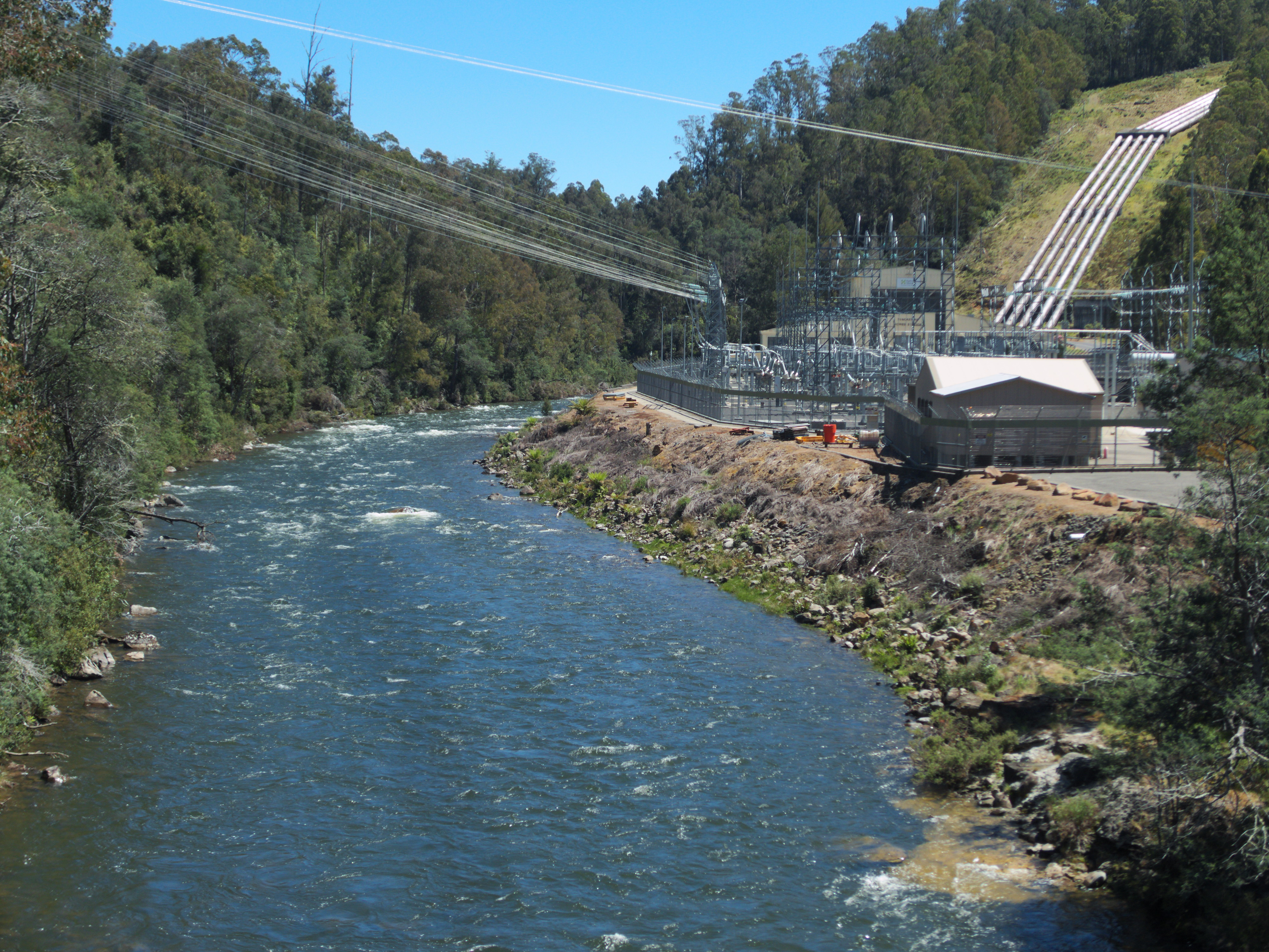
Tungatinah Power Station at Nive River 2017

Part of the Derwent scheme that comprises eleven hydroelectric power stations, the Tungatinah Power Station is the second station in the scheme. The power station is located aboveground adjacent to the Nive River. The headworks are quite complex with several dams (including the Bronte Lagoon formed by Bronte Dam, Bradys Lake formed by Bradys Dam, Pine Tier Lagoon formed by Pine Tier Dam, Lake Binney and the Tungatinah Lagoon), a tunnel, canals, pipelines, flumes their associated control gates and a pump station. Water is diverted from the Tungatinah Lagoon by a short tunnel with surge shaft and then descends 290 metres (950 ft) through five steel penstocks to the power station.

The power station was commissioned between 1953 and 1956 by the Hydro Electric Corporation (TAS) and the station has five Boving Francis-type turbines, with a total generating capacity of 125 megawatts (168,000 hp). Within the station building, each turbine has a semi-embedded spiral casing and water flow is controlled via a spherical rotary inlet valve and a relief valve designed to prevent spiral casing over pressure. The station output, estimated to be 579 gigawatt-hours (2,080 TJ) annually, is fed to TasNetworks' transmission grid via five 11 kV/110 kV three-phase GEC generator transformer to the outdoor switchyard. The building caught fire in the evening of 2nd September 2026.

After passing through the five turbines, water is discharged into the Nive River where it combines with the water from the Tarraleah Power Station to supply the six Lower Derwent stations.

== See also ==
- List of reservoirs and dams in Tasmania
- List of power stations in Tasmania
