= Aurora Energy (Tasmania) =

Electricity retailer in Hobart, Tasmania, Australia

- Company type: Government-owned corporation
- Industry: Energy
- Founded: 1 July 1998
- Headquarters: Hobart, Tasmania, Australia
- Key people: Nigel Clark (CEO)
- Products: Retailer of electricity and natural gas
- Revenue: $957 million (2023/24)
- Net income: $3 million (2023/24)
- Number of employees: 286 (2020)
- Website: www.auroraenergy.com.au

Aurora Energy is a Tasmanian Government-owned electricity retailer in Australia.

== History ==
Aurora was formed on 1 July 1998 under the Electricity Companies Act 1997 as part of the breaking up of the Hydro Electric Commission. It is owned by the Government of Tasmania.

The breaking up of the Hydro-Electric Commission resulted in the formation of three separate state-owned companies: Hydro Tasmania, which generates the power; Transend Networks, which transmitted it across the state; and Aurora Energy, the retail arm, which sells and distributes it to customers. This was in anticipation of Tasmania joining the National Electricity Market, which took place in May 2005.

AETV Power owned and operated the Tamar Valley Power Station in northern Tasmania using natural gas that was piped in from Victoria to generate electricity. On 1 June 2013, the power station, its customers and associated contracts were transferred to Hydro Tasmania.

In late 2005, Aurora began trialling Aurora pay as you go, pre-paid electricity to selected areas of Adelaide. This system involved the Payguard meter, known as a smart meter. The official launch of the product, due to the success of the trial, went ahead in May 2007 making Aurora Energy the first electricity retailer to offer the pre-payment option in South Australia.

In 2012, Aurora failed in its application to the Australian Energy Regulator for electricity price increases of 15.5% over the following 5 years for infrastructure investment and carbon tax implications. Instead, the Regulator limited the price rise to just 1.4% per year until 2017. One result of this was analysis of the current structure and subsequent re-structure of the business. Over the following years, a complete re-structure was undertaken, resulting in hundreds of redundancies throughout the business, from field worker level through to upper management.

Retail contestability was introduced for very large customers in 2006, and in 2007, 2008, 2009, and 2011, additional, progressively smaller consumers of electricity were opened up for competition with Aurora. In 2013, Aurora prepared for the introduction of full retail contestability, including the separation of the retail arm from the rest of the business, and readying that retail arm for the tendered sale of the customer base to two or three private enterprises in late 2013, with sale date to be 1 January 2014. The market would then be opened for additional retailers to compete for customers from 1 July 2014. As the result of a government funded study, it was found that there would not be a benefit to the consumer at that point, and the tendering process was aborted. Although the sale of the customer base did not go ahead, the date of full retail contestability remained at 1 July 2014, and the market is now open for other entities to compete for all customers.

As a result of the prior re-structuring, Aurora delivered a bonus to customers with an average 5% drop in electricity prices.

The non-retail sections of Aurora Energy merged with Transend Networks on 1 July 2014 to become TasNetworks. The retail arm of Aurora retained its original name and continues retailing electricity and natural gas in the state.
