= Hydro-Electric Commission Building =

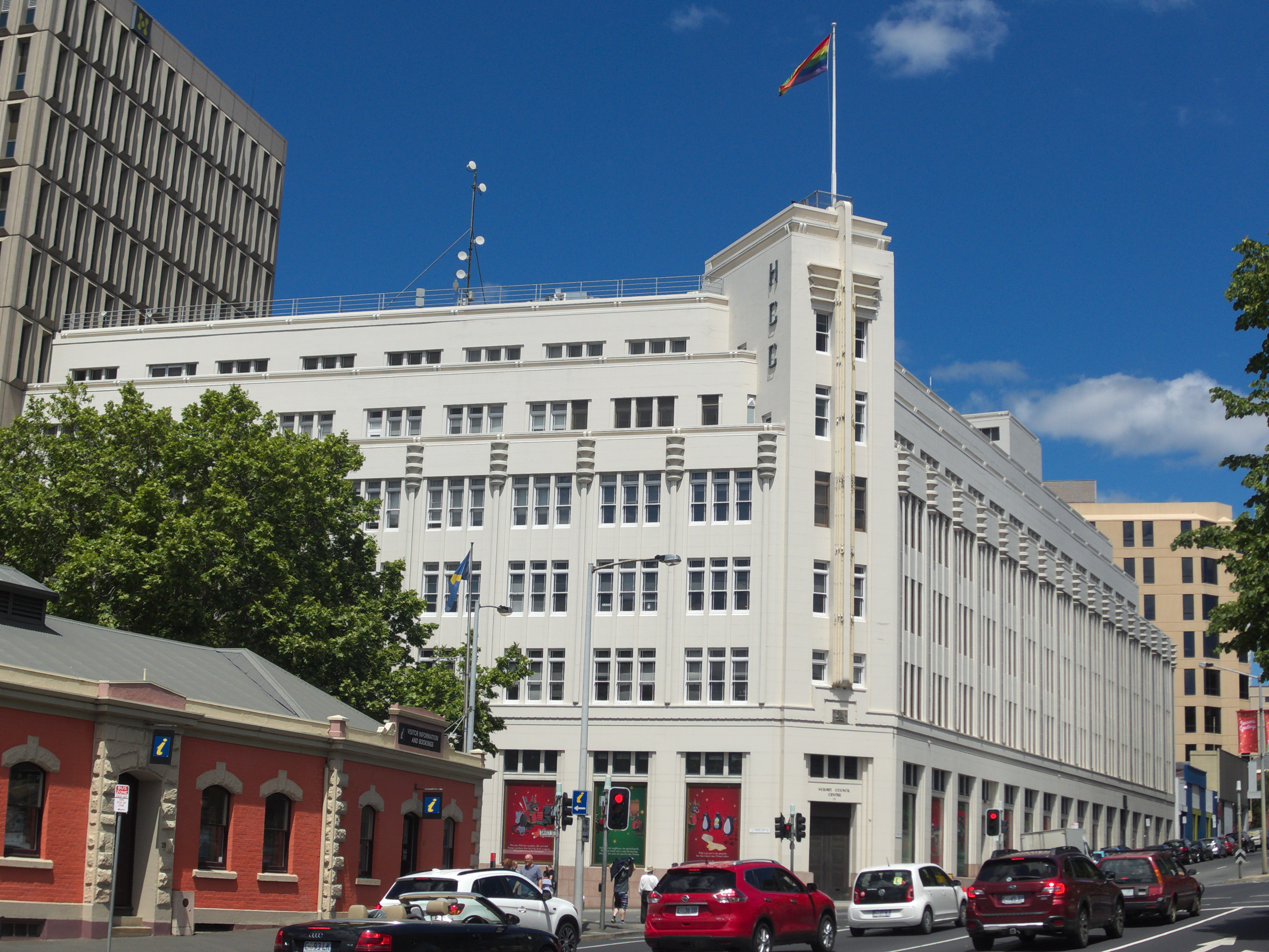
- The Hydro-Electric Commission building in 2017
- Interactive map of the Hydro-Electric Commission Building area

General information
- Type: Government offices
- Location: Hobart, Tasmania, 16 Elizabeth Street
- Coordinates: 42.8834°S 147.3313°E
- Completed: 1938
- Owner: historic: Hydro-Electric Commission present: Hobart City Council

Technical details
- Floor count: 6

Design and construction
- Architects: A & K Henderson

Tasmanian Heritage Register
- Place ID: 2332
- Status: Permanently Registered

The Hydro-Electric Commission Building is a historic art deco building in the central business district of Hobart, Tasmania, Australia. It was designed by the firm of A & K Henderson in 1938 as the headquarters of the Hydro-Electric Commission, the state-government hydro power authority. It is presently owned by the City of Hobart, operated as the Hobart Council Centre, serving the council and community organisations including start up incubator Enterprize.

It is permanently registered on the Tasmanian Heritage Register.

== History ==
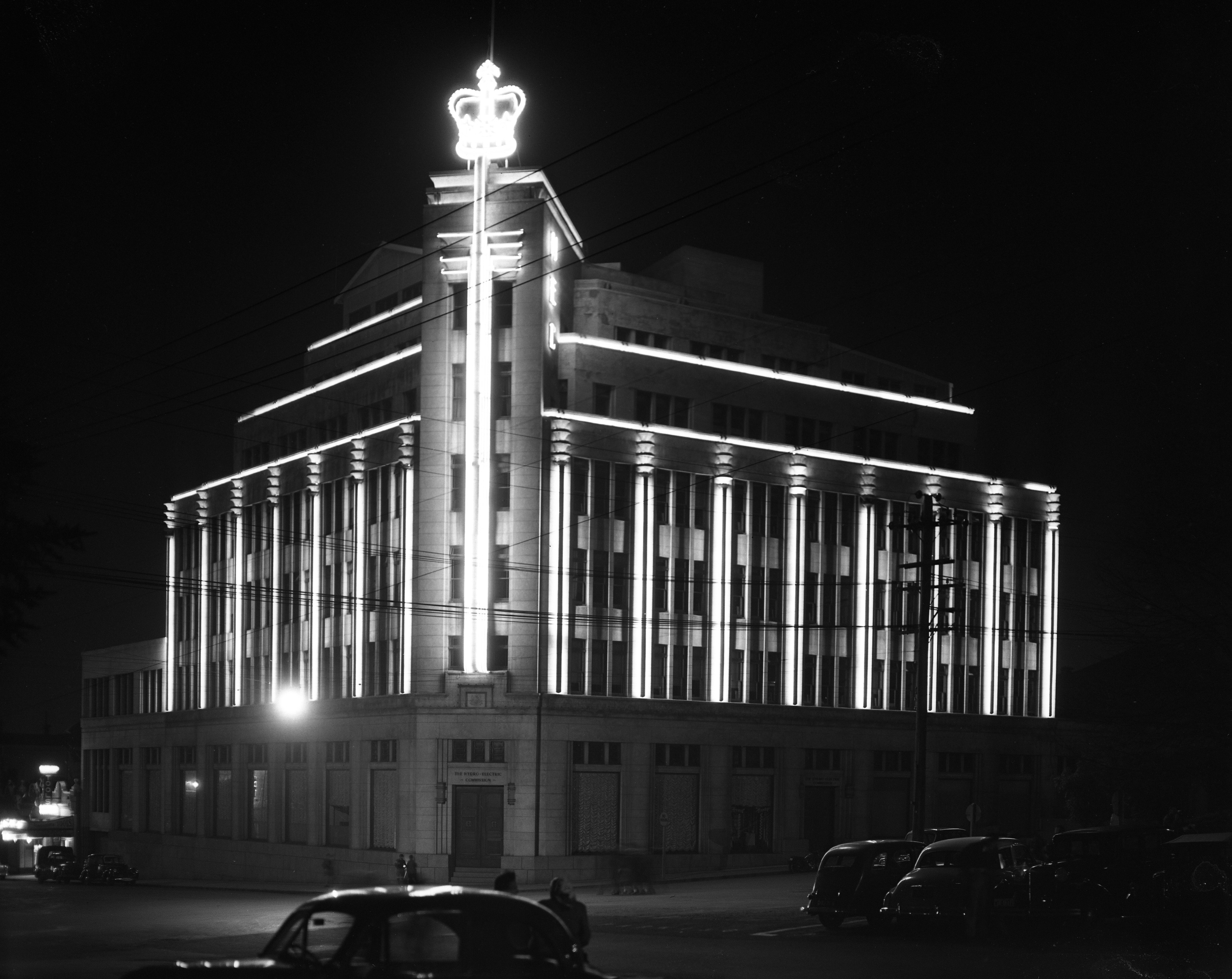
Illuminated for Queen Elizabeth II's coronation in 1953

Hobart City Council acquired the building in 1995, moving administrative functions from the Hobart Town Hall.
