= Huxley Hill Wind Farm =

Wind farm on King Island, Tasmania

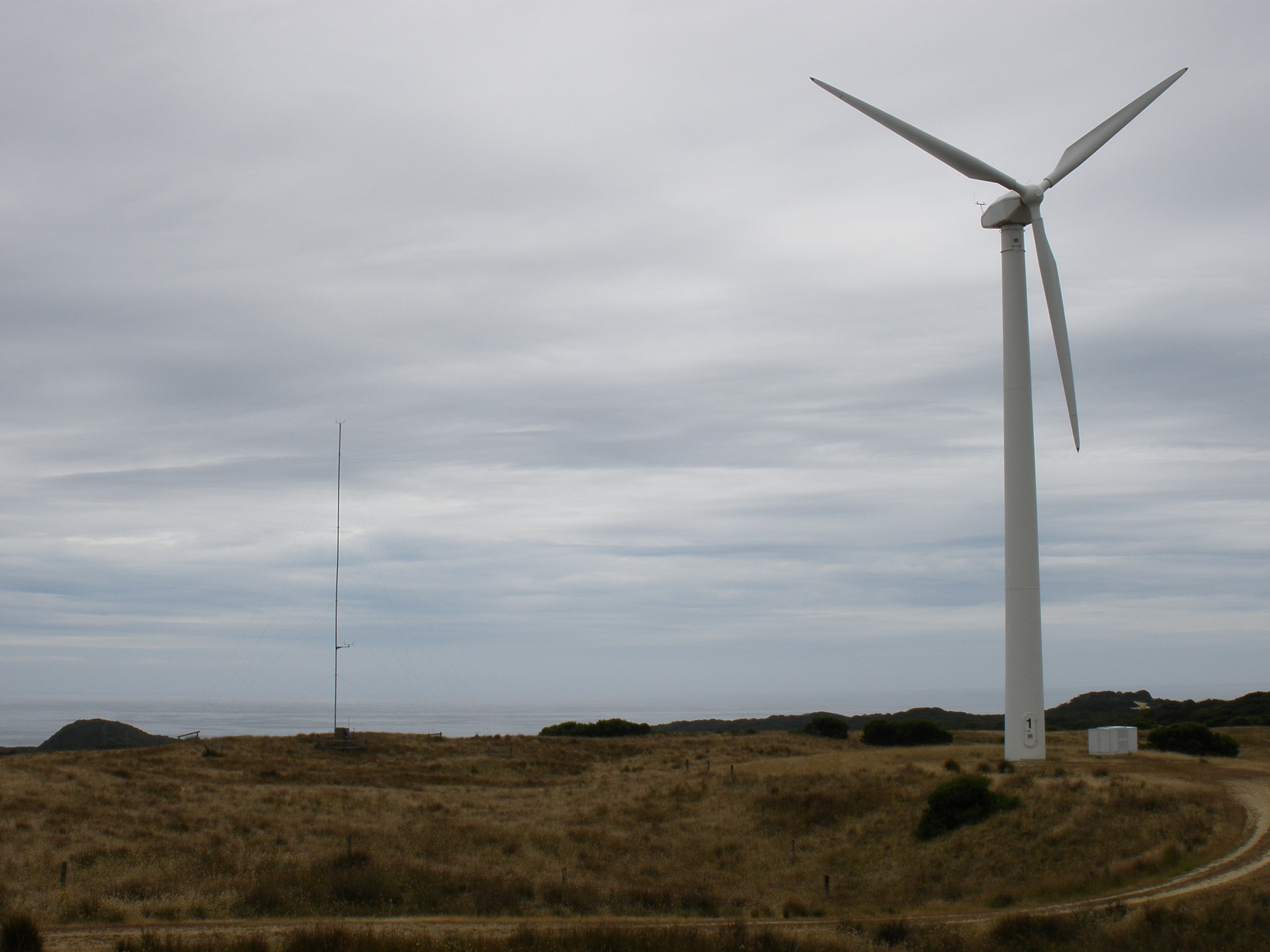
- Country: Australia
- Location: King Island, Tasmania
- Coordinates: 39.94127825°S 143.87395767°E
- Status: Operational
- Commission date: 1998
- Owner: Hydro Tasmania

Wind farm
- Type: onshore

Power generation
- Units operational: 3 X 250 kW; 2 X 850
- Make and model: Nordex N26; Vestas
- Nameplate capacity: 2.5 MW

Huxley Hill Wind Farm (also known as the King Island Wind Farm) is a wind power station at King Island, Tasmania, Australia, of around 1,600 residents, owned by Hydro Tasmania, which supplements the four diesel generators with a combined capacity of 6 MW at Currie Power Station. King Island also has a 100 kW solar capacity provided with monocrystaline solar panels on dual-axis arrays.

The wind farm started generating in 1998, initially with three 250 kW Nordex N29 wind turbines at a cost of $2.5 M ($3,300/kW), then in 2003 with two 850 kW Vestas Turbines, to provide a total wind generating capacity of 2.5 MW of electricity. Wind generation provides around 35% of the annual generation.

As a declared Community Service Obligation, the Tasmanian Government provides around $7 million per annum in funding support for the electricity supply equivalent to around $2,500 per resident per annum.

== Flow battery storage ==
Diagram of a Flow Battery

During the 2003 expansion a vanadium redox flow battery was installed at a cost of $4M (or $20,000 per kW), containing 55,000 litres of vanadium based electrolyte—one of the first such installations on a wind farm. This allowed up to 800 kWh of surplus electricity to be stored. The battery has an output power of 200 kW, making up around 3% of total capacity, and could be used to smooth the substantial variability in wind output over minutes to hours. When used in conjunction with a variable resistive load, a higher wind penetration is possible, permitting the substantial second to second variability to be controlled with the resistor, reducing the need to spill excess wind through throttling of the turbines. A short-term peak output of 400 kW can be supplied. As a result, there has been a substantial reduction in the use of diesel fuel, however the full diesel capacity must be maintained, including the need to maintain spinning reserve for system security. However, the system proved to be not robust enough and failed after a relatively short life. It has been replaced with a 1.6 MWh "advanced lead acid technology" battery.
