= Woolnorth Wind Farm =

Wind farm in Tasmania, Australia

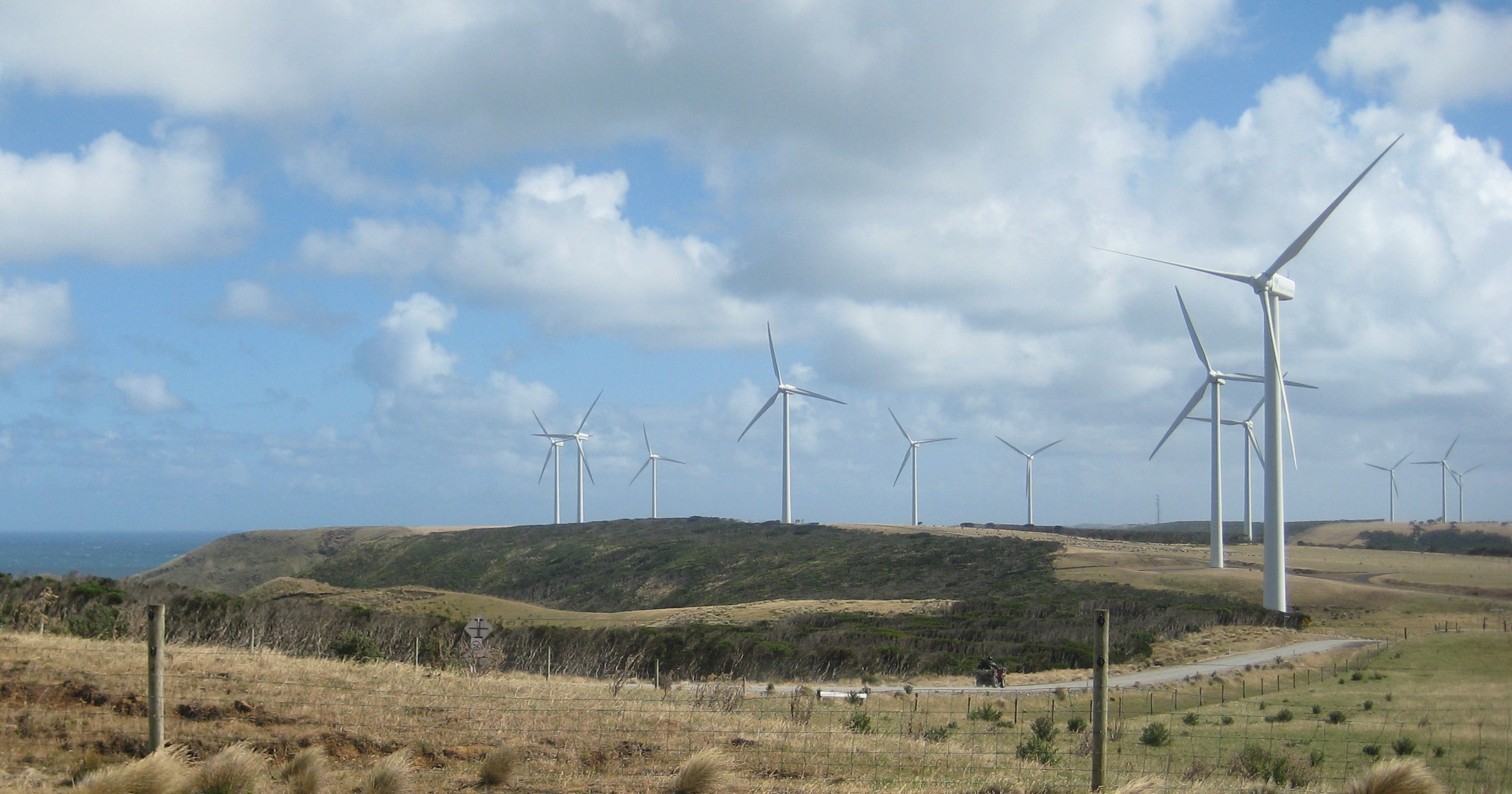
- Country: Australia
- Location: Woolnorth, Tasmania
- Coordinates: 40.685°S 144.717°E
- Commission date: 2002, 2004, 2007
- Owners: Shenhua Group (75%); Hydro Tasmania (25%)

Wind farm
- Hub height: 60 metres (197 ft) Vestas V66; 80 metres (262 ft) Vestas V90
- Rotor diameter: 66 metres (217 ft); 90 metres (295 ft)

Power generation
- Units operational: 37 × 1.75 MW; 25 × 3 MW
- Make and model: Vestas V66 1.75 MW; Vestas V90 3 MW
- Nameplate capacity: 140 MW (190,000 hp)
- Capacity factor: 39.68% (average 2011-2021)
- Annual net output: 486.6 GWh (average 2011-2021)

Woolnorth Wind Farm is a wind power complex, comprising two wind farms — Bluff Point and Studland Bay. They are located at the Woolnorth property at Woolnorth (which includes the location known as Cape Grim), in the far north-west of Tasmania, Australia. Both wind farms are operated by Woolnorth Wind Farm Holdings, a 75:25 joint venture between Shenhua Group and Hydro Tasmania.

== Farms ==
Bluff Point Wind Farm was constructed in two stages. The first consisted of six 1.75 MW Vestas V66 turbines and was commissioned in 2002. Stage two, commissioned in 2004, expanded the wind farm with a further 31 of the same turbines, for a total generating capacity of 65 MW.

Studland Bay Wind Farm was commissioned in 2007 and consists of 25 Vestas V90 turbines, each with a capacity of 3 MW, for a total capacity of 75 MW.

== Operations ==
The generation table uses eljmkt nemlog to obtain generation values for each month. Records date back to 2011.

Woolnorth Wind Farm Generation (MWh)
Year	Total	Jan	Feb	Mar	Apr	May	Jun	Jul	Aug	Sep	Oct	Nov	Dec
2011	469,716	39,658	35,858	42,696	31,365	30,879	46,484	46,893	30,734	46,957	39,985	39,969	38,238
2012	467,622	49,830	28,135	43,462	19,446	40,616	40,214	30,236	46,554	47,482	36,285	37,515	47,847
2013	536,388	35,686	40,057	46,856	37,311	35,635	38,169	43,667	62,645	50,599	57,331	37,831	50,601
2014	463,337	48,550	39,743	33,422	31,214	35,523	36,174	42,433	32,790	38,382	48,292	46,512	30,302
2015	483,614	44,238	41,695	38,120	28,442	48,737	35,140	45,423	42,212	29,484	37,157	47,441	45,525
2016	508,793	38,161	33,279	33,181	31,385	55,111	43,337	53,442	44,660	31,282	56,429	43,842	44,684
2017	493,690	43,947	39,019	35,655	25,462	36,867	32,184	40,560	39,962	58,798	44,544	53,543	43,149
2018	510,694	37,593	40,834	44,183	34,802	51,719	36,433	54,842	50,383	44,162	38,224	37,697	39,822
2019	550,350	38,060	48,520	35,164	46,764	46,939	36,721	59,585	49,236	42,244	43,823	50,838	52,456
2020	479,922	39,710	41,761	38,743	40,451	36,148	33,202	29,394	42,176	49,225	35,982	44,857	48,273
2021	388,395	41,326	43,681	48,620	41,453	22,329*	13,845*	21,981*	26,665*	25,446*	30,290	31,801	40,958

In May 2021, output was limited to ~75 MW.

== See also ==
- Wind power in Australia
