= Cethana Dam =

Dam and power station in Tasmania, Australia

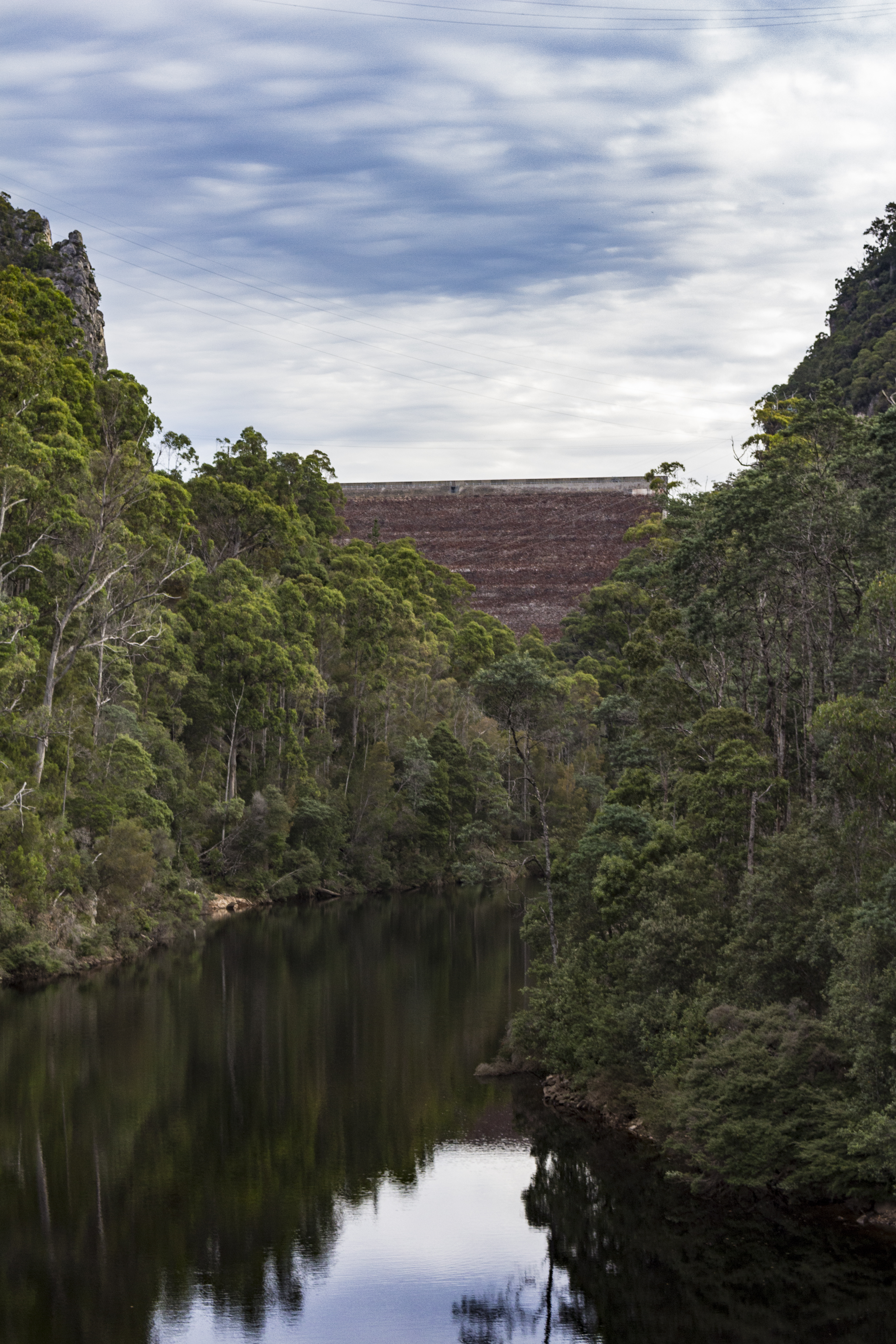
- The dam wall, in 2017

- Location of the dam in Tasmania
- Interactive map of Cethana Dam
- Country: Australia
- Location: Northern Tasmania
- Coordinates: 41°28′47″S 146°8′1″E
- Purpose: Power
- Status: Operational
- Construction began: 1967
- Opening date: 1971
- Owner: Hydro Tasmania

Dam and spillways
- Type of dam: Rock-fill dam
- Impounds: Forth River
- Height: 113 m (371 ft)
- Length: 213 m (699 ft)
- Dam volume: 1,407×10^{3} m^{3} (49.7×10^{6} cu ft)
- Spillways: 1
- Spillway type: Uncontrolled
- Spillway capacity: 1,980 m^{3}/s (70,000 cu ft/s)

Reservoir
- Creates: Lake Cethana
- Total capacity: 112.21 GL (90,970 acre⋅ft)
- Catchment area: 610 km^{2} (240 sq mi)
- Surface area: 41.4 ha (102 acres)

Cethana Power Station
- Operator: Hydro Tasmania
- Commission date: 1971
- Type: Run-of-the-river
- Hydraulic head: 98 m (322 ft)
- Turbines: 1 x 100 MW (130,000 hp); Fuji Francis-type
- Installed capacity: 100 MW (130,000 hp)
- Capacity factor: 0.85
- Annual generation: 434 GWh (1,560 TJ)
- Website hydro.com.au

The Cethana Dam is a concrete-faced rockfill embankment dam across the Forth River, located near Sheffield in northern Tasmania, Australia. Completed in 1971, the resultant reservoir, Lake Cethana, was established for the purpose of generating hydro-electric power via the Cethana Power Station, a run-of-the-river hydroelectric power station.

The dam, its reservoir, and the power station are owned and operated by Hydro Tasmania.

== Dam and reservoir overview ==
Built between 1967 and 1971, the concrete-faced rock-filled dam wall is 113 metres (371 ft) high and 213 metres (699 ft) long. When full, Lake Cethana has capacity of 112.21 gigalitres (90,970 acre⋅ft) and covers 414 hectares (1,020 acres), drawn from a catchment area of 612 square kilometres (236 sq mi). The single uncontrolled spillway is capable of discharging 1,980 cubic metres per second (70,000 cu ft/s).

The Cethana Dam is listed as a National Engineering Landmark by Engineers Australia as part of its Engineering Heritage Recognition Program.

== Hydroelectric power station ==
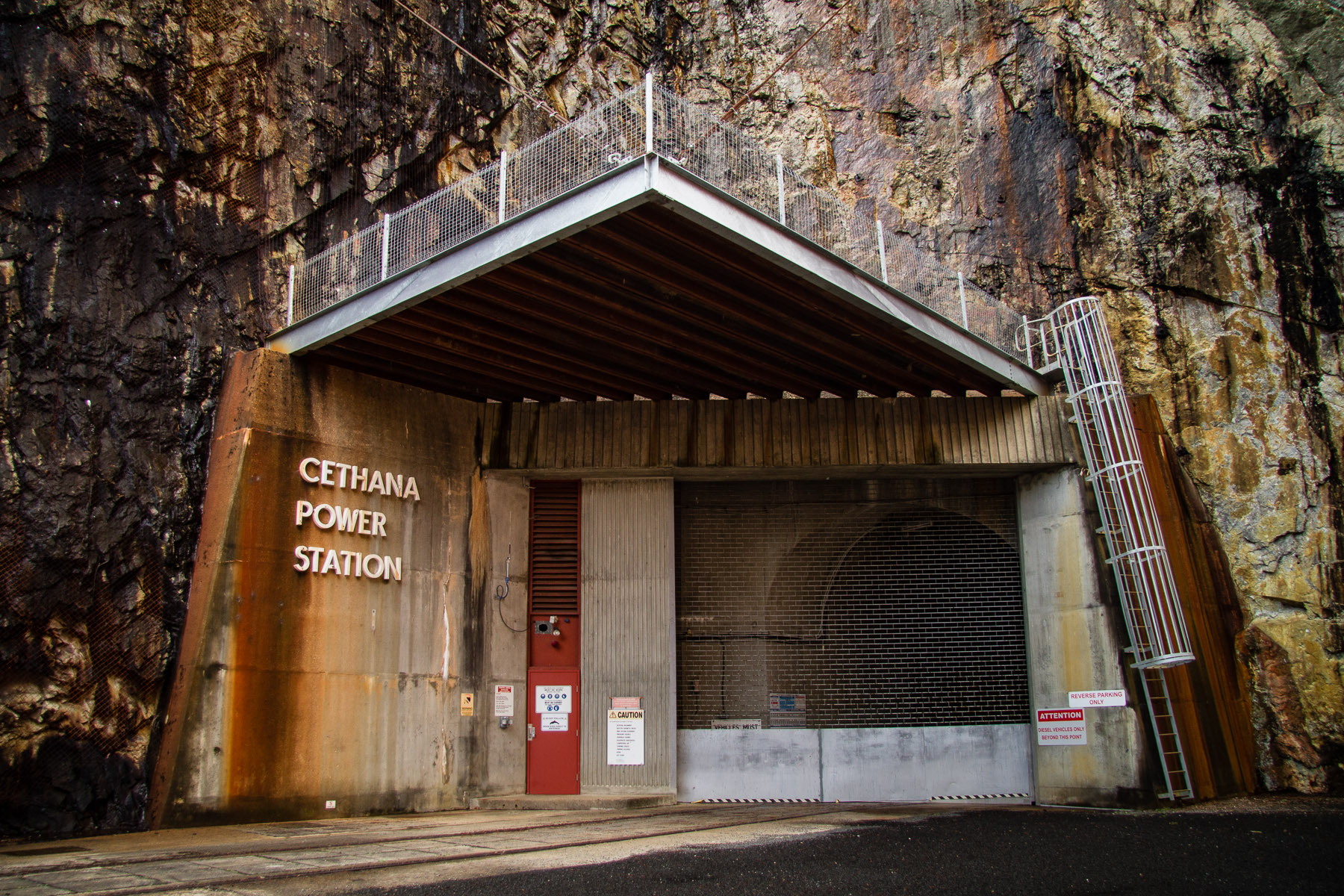
Entrance to the underground Cethana Power Station

The Cethana Power Station is part of the Mersey–Forth scheme that comprises seven run-of-the-river hydroelectric power stations and one mini-hydro power station. The sixth station in the scheme, the Cethana Power Station is located underground and is supplied with water from Lake Cethana, from the Wilmot Power Station located below Lake Gairdner, and uncontrolled flow from the Forth River. Water from the Cethana power station is returned to the Forth River through a tailrace tunnel which has a tailrace gate structure at the outlet portal.

The power station was commissioned in 1971 by the Hydro Electric Corporation (TAS) and the station has one Fuji Francis-type turbine, with a generating capacity of 100 megawatts (130,000 hp) of electricity. The station output, estimated to be 434 gigawatt-hours (1,560 TJ) annually, is fed to the outdoor switchyard via a three single-phase 13.8 kV/220 kV Fuji generator transformer.

=== Proposed pumped-storage station ===
In 2023, under the Environment Protection and Biodiversity Conservation Act 1999 (Cth), Hydro Tasmania, as part of their Battery of the Nation initiative, submitted to the Australian Government approval of a proposed 750-megawatt (1,010×10^{3} hp) underground pumped-storage hydroelectric plant. It was proposed that the plant use the existing Lake Cethana as a lower storage reservoir and that it be connected, via underground tunnels and a new underground power station, to a new off-stream embankment dam with capacity of 12.4 gigalitres (10,100 acre⋅ft) covering approximately 100 hectares (250 acres), located above the western side of the existing reservoir. Additional transmission lines and a switchyard were also proposed. In April 2025, Hydro Tasmania decided to cancel the project.

== See also ==
- List of power stations in Tasmania
- List of reservoirs and dams in Tasmania
- List of run-of-the-river hydroelectric power stations
