= Musselroe Wind Farm =

Wind farm in Tasmania, Australia

- Country: Australia
- Location: Cape Portland
- Coordinates: 40.780556°S 148.029444°E
- Status: Operational
- Commission date: 2013
- Construction cost: $394 million
- Operator: Hydro Tasmania

Wind farm
- Type: Onshore
- Hub height: 80 metres (262 ft)
- Rotor diameter: 90 metres (295 ft)
- Rated wind speed: 15 m/s (49 ft/s)

Power generation
- Units operational: 56 × 3 MW
- Make and model: Vestas V90
- Units planned: 56 × 3 MW
- Nameplate capacity: 168 MW
- Capacity factor: 38.39% (average 2014-2021)
- Annual net output: 564.9 GWh (average 2014-2021)

External links
- Website: www.woolnorthwind.com.au/wind-farms/musselroe

Musselroe Wind Farm is a wind farm at Cape Portland, Tasmania, Australia. It was the third wind farm built in the state, following the Bluff Point and Studland Bay Wind Farms (making up the larger Woolnorth Wind Farm). The property was previously owned by businessman John C. Bowden of Dallas, Texas.

While it is operated by Hydro Tasmania, which has a 25% stake in the farm, China-based Shenhua Clean Energy (SCE) owns a 75% stake in the farm. Guohua Energy Investment owns a 75% share in SCE, while its sister company, Shenhua Hong Kong, owning the remaining 25% share in SCE.

The farm consists of 56 Vestas V90-3MW wind turbines, with a generating capacity of 168 MW. The energy output from the Musselroe Wind Farm will be sufficient to supply electricity to around 50,000 households and abate 450,000 tonnes of CO_{2} emissions annually.

The first 37 turbines were connected to the grid in 2013, and the full farm was completed in January 2014.

== Operations ==
The generation table uses eljmkt nemlog to obtain generation values for each month. Grid connection started in March 2013, and was fully commissioned during September 2013.

Musselroe Wind Farm Generation (MWh)
Year	Total	Jan	Feb	Mar	Apr	May	Jun	Jul	Aug	Sep	Oct	Nov	Dec
2013	295,995	N/A	N/A	32*	241*	945*	7,468*	30,983*	48,784*	51,220*	68,997	35,500	51,825
2014	484,474	34,713	27,852	31,917	34,204	44,233	39,258	40,538	34,299	46,341	53,862	47,685	49,572
2015	510,368	45,190	29,885	53,417	24,113	48,269	45,136	52,411	43,939	25,602	36,782	56,514	49,110
2016	612,762	42,717	35,000	32,513	38,435	54,397	66,585	74,100	52,272	40,050	65,207	61,271	50,215
2017	552,314	58,317	45,091	35,292	23,034	37,767	42,745	47,559	47,323	69,999	51,901	32,724	60,562
2018	581,505	41,025	36,252	43,946	52,602	60,142	41,883	67,299	61,374	59,152	32,440	40,365	45,025
2019	654,555	50,717	53,246	41,241	49,790	55,566	40,342	74,391	59,072	55,465	50,408	70,404	53,913
2020	555,972	52,825	58,586	30,647	56,364	47,486	37,668	36,360	46,909	50,266	45,181	39,047	54,633
2021	567,380	49,594	34,507	50,766	57,488	47,518	30,729	50,829	62,706	59,434	52,991	31,725	39,093

Note: Asterisk indicates power output was limited during the month.

Note: From 2018, the wind farm participated in the FCAS market; this generally reduces the amount of power provided to the grid in order to allow a ramp up when required. The wind farm now has an apparent limit of ≈153 MW, rarely returning to its previous maximum output of around ≈166 MW when the grid demands it.
