= River Forth (Tasmania) =

River in Tasmania, Australia

Coordinates: 41.61°S 146.13°E

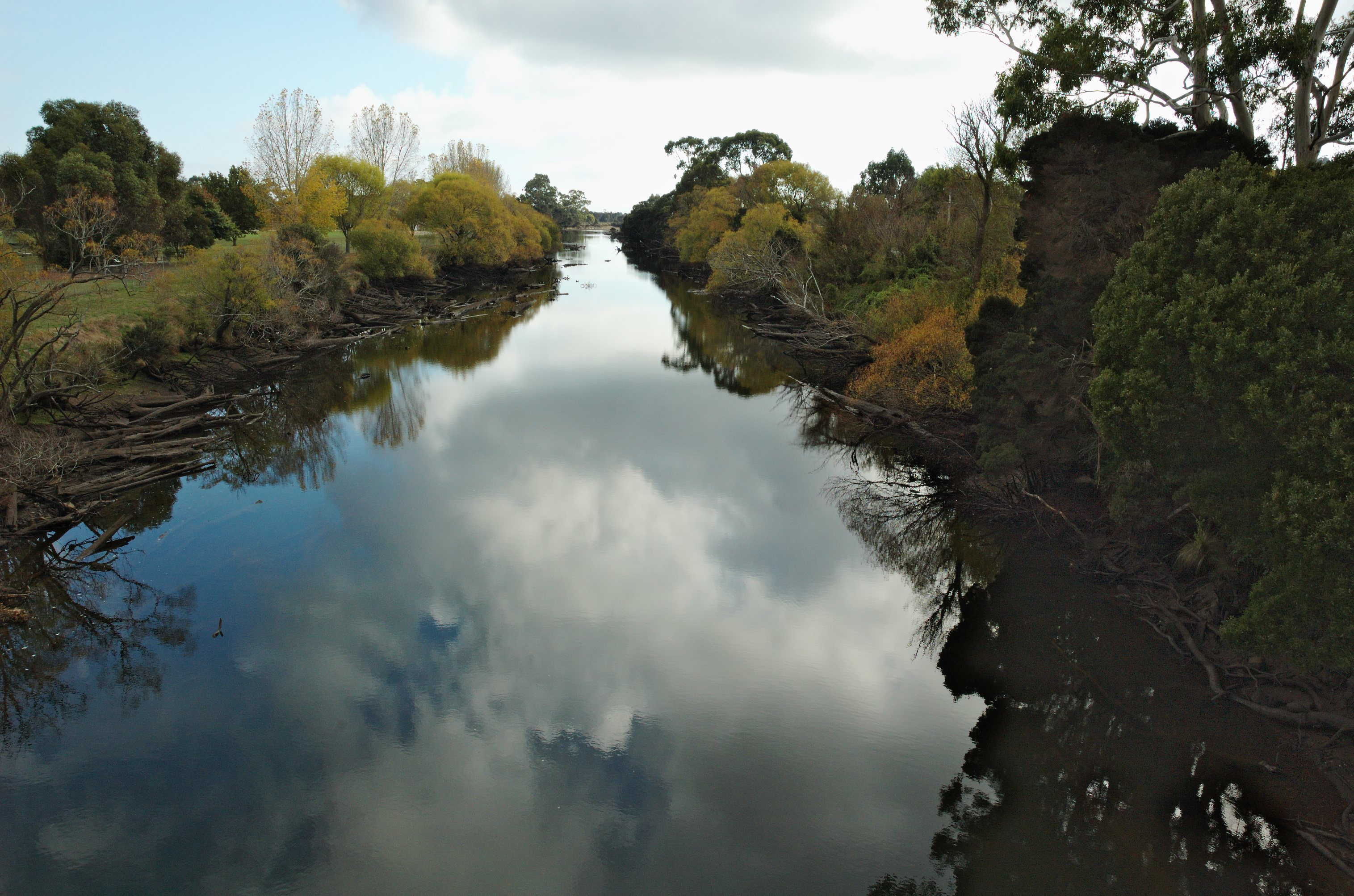
- River Forth at Forth

Location
- Country: Australia
- State: Tasmania

Physical characteristics
- Source: Mount Pelion West
- Mouth: Bass Strait
  - elevation: 0 metres (0 ft)
- Length: 95 kilometres (59 mi)
- Basin size: 1,126 square kilometres (435 mi^{2})

Basin features
- Progression: Pelion Range → Bass Strait

The River Forth is a perennial river in northwest Tasmania, Australia.

== Location and features ==
The lower part of the river features Lake Barrington, which is a major venue for competitive rowing. It is also the location of the village of Forth.

The river is a part of the Mersey-Forth power project, which includes seven hydroelectric power stations. Three hydroelectric power stations have been built on the Forth River itself: Cethana Power Station (impounding Lake Cethana), Devils Gate Power Station (impounding Lake Barrington) and Paloona Power Station (impounding Lake Paloona).

The upper part of the river catchment area is also known as the Forth River High Country and contains the Cradle Mountain-Lake St Clair National Park, with the source of the river being on the southern slopes of Mount Pelion West.

The catchment for the river is 1,126 square kilometres (435 sq mi).

There are several dams built on this river, including the Cethana, Devils Gate, and Paloona. In total, they generate over 300,000 kilowatts power.

== See also ==
- List of rivers of Australia § Tasmania
