= TasNetworks =

State owned company in Tasmania

- Company type: State-owned enterprise
- Industry: Public utility
- Predecessor: Transend Networks; Aurora Energy
- Founded: 1 July 2014
- Headquarters: Lenah Valley, Tasmania, Australia
- Area served: Tasmania
- Services: Electricity transmission and distribution, Telecommunications
- Owner: Government of Tasmania
- Website: www.tasnetworks.com.au

TasNetworks (Tasmanian Networks) is a Tasmanian Government state-owned enterprise that is responsible for electricity transmission and distribution throughout Tasmania, Australia. It also owns and operates a telecommunications network throughout the state.

TasNetworks is a participant in the Australian National Electricity Market (NEM) that operates an interconnected power system that extends from Queensland to South Australia. Tasmania is connected to the NEM via the Basslink interconnector, which is a 370 km (230 mi) HVDC submarine cable.

TasNetworks is a regulated monopoly that receives its revenue cap from the Australian Energy Regulator. The company has two shareholders, the Minister for Energy and the Treasurer of Tasmania. TasNetworks was formed on 1 July 2014, following the merger of the transmission company Transend Networks and the distribution division of Aurora Energy, which became a retail-only business.
