= Charles David =

Charles David may refer to:

- Charles David (architect) (1552–1650), French architect
- Charles David (company), a designer of leather goods
- Charles David (field hockey) (born 1968), Malaysian Olympic hockey player
- Charles Walter David Jr. (1917–1943), United States Coast Guard steward's mate awarded the Navy and Marine Corps Medal
  - USCGC Charles David Jr.
- Charles Wendell David (1885–1984), American librarian
- Charles St John David (1855–1924), British-born Australian civil engineer
- Charles Henri David (1906–1999), French film executive
- Charlie David (born 1980), Canadian actor
