= Duck Reach Power Station =

Former power station, now museum, in Launceston, Tasmania,

Duck Reach Weir
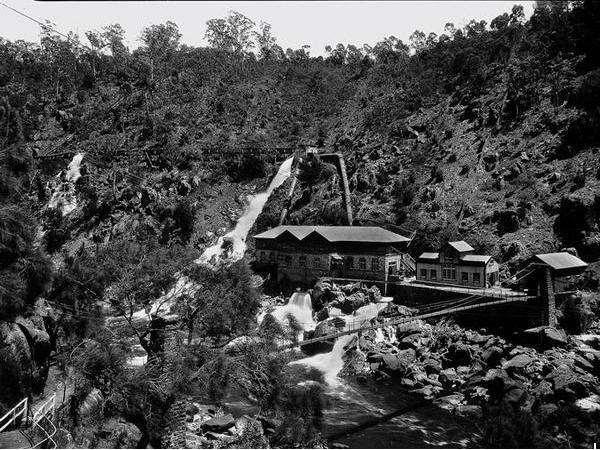
- Duck Reach Power Station, c. 1930

- Location of the power station in Tasmania
- Interactive map of Duck Reach Weir
- Country: Australia
- Location: Launceston, Tasmania
- Coordinates: 41°27′33″S 147°6′40″E
- Purpose: Power
- Status: Decommissioned
- Opening date: 1895
- Designed by: Launceston Town Council; Charles St John David; Kynaston Murray
- Owners: Launceston Town Council (1895–1945); Hydroelectric Department, Tasmania (1945–1955)

Dam and spillways
- Type of dam: Barrage
- Impounds: South Esk River

Duck Reach Power Station
- Commission date: 1895
- Decommission date: 1955
- Type: Conventional
- Hydraulic head: 34 m (112 ft)
- Turbines: 8x: Thompson vortex; Francis-type
- Installed capacity: 0.360 MW (483 hp) (1895–1899); 0.560 MW (751 hp) (1899–1905); 1.3 MW (1,700 hp) (1905–1921); 2 MW (2,700 hp) (1921–1955)

Tasmanian Heritage Register
- Official name: Cataract Gorge
- Reference no.: 11817

The Duck Reach Power Station was the first publicly-owned hydroelectric power station in the Southern Hemisphere. Completed in 1895, the conventional plant provided power to Launceston, in northern Tasmania, Australia. Formed by the Duck Reach Weir across the South Esk River and a diversionary penstock, the plant operated until 1955. The site was repurposed as a technology museum in 1995.

The power scheme was built by the Launceston Town Council to provide electric street lighting to replace gas lights. The station generated direct current (DC) for arc lamps and alternating current (AC) for both incandescent lamps and electric motors. The former power station, now museum, is located within the Cataract Gorge Reserve, listed on the Tasmanian Heritage Register.

== Construction ==
The site was picked by Launceston surveyor and engineer Charles St John David in 1892. A low diversion weir was constructed across the Cataract Gorge of the South Esk River. A 850-metre-long (2,790 ft) and 1.5-metre-wide (5 ft) tunnel was built through dolerite rock, and a 1.5-metre-wide (5 ft) wrought iron penstock ran diagonally down the hill at a 1 to 110 grade. The tunnel was cut through the hill side instead of being piped around and it took 16 months to complete using pneumatic drills. The dolerite was so hard it took one week of eighteen eight-hour shifts cutting from both ends of the tunnel to cut just 2.5 metres (8 ft 2 in), however the average speed of the drilling was about 5 metres (16 ft) a week. Two men were killed in accidents. When both ends met it was found that the accuracy was within twenty-five millimetres (1 in). The head was approximately 34 metres (110 ft).

The penstock ran into the centre of the rear of the power station that was perched above the river bank. From there, it was channeled in to successively smaller pipes and finally to eight turbines by Gilbert Gilkes & Co. and generators by Siemens provided a total output of approximately 360 kilowatts (480 hp). Five small sets generated 60 kilowatts (80 hp) at 1,750 volts DC for the street arc lamps. Three larger sets produced 2,000 volts AC and 92 cycles per second for incandescent street lamps, domestic lighting and electric motors.

== Operational history ==
The power station operated on a trial basis on the evening of 10 December 1895, when it was used to illuminate some of Launceston's streets using arc lights. On 1 February 1896, the hydroelectric power system was officially switched on, remained in operation until 1955.

In 1899, two additional 100-kilowatt (130 hp) AC sets were installed. By the early 1900s the demand for electricity was rising and again it became necessary to further upgrade the plant by increasing water storage to boost low summer flows, and a second penstock was constructed from the tunnel to the power station. Much of the original equipment was removed and replaced with four horizontal shaft 332-kilowatt (445 hp) Francis-type turbines, each coupled to a single 300-kilowatt (400 hp) three-phase Siemens alternator. This raised the AC capacity of the station to 1.2 megawatts (1,600 hp). The original DC equipment remained in use.

By c. 1915, this had become inadequate, and to ease the problem, between 1919 and 1920, a new 880-kilowatt (1,180 hp) turbine coupled to a 800-kilowatt (1,100 hp) alternator was added alongside the existing machinery at the eastern end of the machine hall. To drive this new turbine a timber flume and a masonry aqueduct was constructed, running from Deadman's Hollow around the bend in the South Esk River to the slope immediately behind the power station, where it was led into a new steel penstock running alongside the original one. The addition of this new turbine and alternator raised the capacity of the station to 2 megawatts (2,700 hp). In 1924, Launceston connected to the Tasmanian electricity grid through a transmission line from the Waddamana Power Stations.

A significant flood on the South East River in 1929 resulted in damage to the station building and the machines were inundated. The station building was rebuilt in 1932, the generators repaired and restored to service. The Hydro-Electric Commission supplied power to Launceston in the interim period. The station was compulsorily acquired by the Hydro-Electric Commission in 1945 and continued in full service until 1955, following the construction of the Trevallyn Dam and the adjacent Trevallyn Power Station. Water from the weir and penstock was diverted to the new power station. The station was officially decommissioned in 1956, most of the equipment was removed, and the HEC offered the building to back to the Council.

=== 21st-century developments ===
In March 2012 the Launceston City Council voted in favour of investigating the redevelopment of the historic Duck Reach power station for power generation with initial interest from Hydro Tasmania.

== Duck Reach Museum ==
Duck Reach Museum
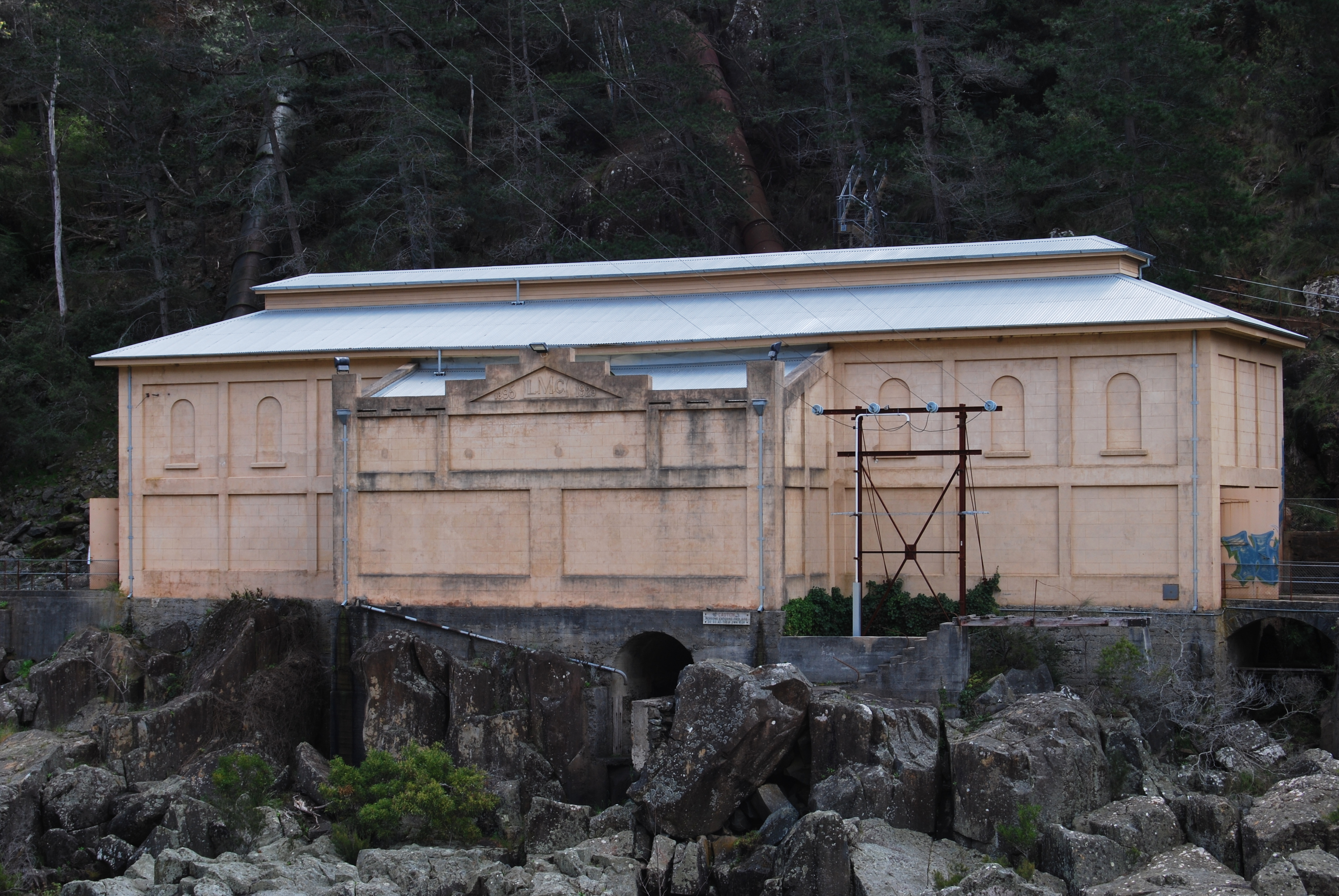
- The former powerhouse, now a museum and interpretive centre
- Established: 1995
- Location: Launceston, Tasmania
- Type: Technology museum
- Founder: Hydro Tasmania
- Owner: City of Launceston

Michael Sharland, an authority on early Tasmanian buildings, suggested that the Launceston City Council and the Hydro Electric Commission work together to establish a technological museum on the former power station site, as published in The Examiner on 17 December 1956. The concept gained the support of the Mayor of Launceston and other members of the community. In March 1957 the Hydro Electric Commission offered the station to the Council. However, the Director of the Queen Victoria Museum recommended to Council that they decline the offer, and stated that it was the responsibility of the HEC or other Tasmanian Government agencies to preserve the buildings and plant.

Various studies from the mid 1970s and 1980s suggested that the former power station by repurposed as a museum of early Tasmanian hydro electric power development, the old suspension bridge be rehabilitated to link both side of the river, the engineers' cottages be repurposed for support services, walking trails lead to and from the former power station, and the linking of other recreational activities.

In 1995, on the centenary of its opening, the former power station was made weatherproof, the suspension bridge restored and the building re-opened as a technology museum.

The Tasmanian Legislative Council Hansard of April 2011 records a lengthy debate in which Kerry Finch, MLC for Rosevears, suggested '… the resurrection of the Duck Reach Power Station as a working mini-power station… ' as a means for getting more "water down the Gorge".

In June 2016, major flooding of the North and South Esk rivers resulted in the museum again inundated with water – the most significant since a major flood in 1969. Restoration work was completed including reinstatement of the flying fox that was damaged in floods of 1929, repairs to the penstock gantry, and reinstate one of the original turbines. Heavy equipment was moved into the site using helicopters. One of the 1895 original Siemens 15-kilowatt (20 hp) DC dynamos is preserved and on display in the far end of the station.

== See also ==
- List of reservoirs and dams in Tasmania
- List of power stations in Tasmania
- List of museums in Tasmania
