= Cataract Gorge =

Gorge in Tasmania, Australia

- The Gorge
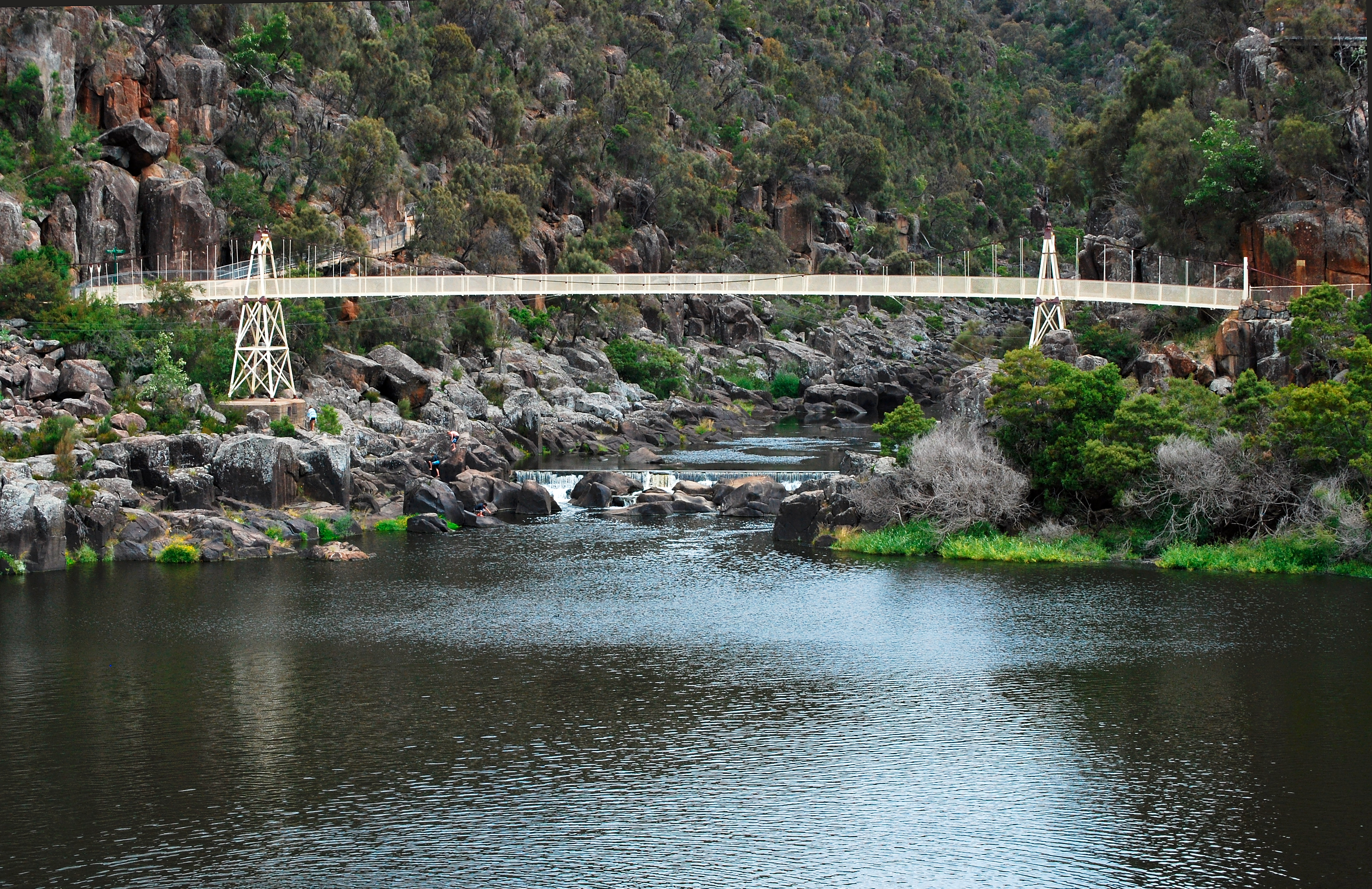
- Alexandra Suspension bridge at Cataract Gorge's First Basin

Geography
- Country: Australia
- State: Tasmania
- Municipality: Launceston
- Coordinates: 41°26′46″S 147°7′10″E
- Interactive map of Cataract Gorge

Tasmanian Heritage Register
- Official name: Cataract Gorge
- Reference no.: 11817

The Cataract Gorge is a river gorge in Launceston, Tasmania, Australia, approximately 1.5 km from the city centre. It is one of the region's premier tourist attractions. It is found at the lower section of the South Esk River. The site is listed on the Tasmanian Heritage Register.

== History ==
The earliest known European visitor to the site was William Collins, who discovered its entrance in 1804.

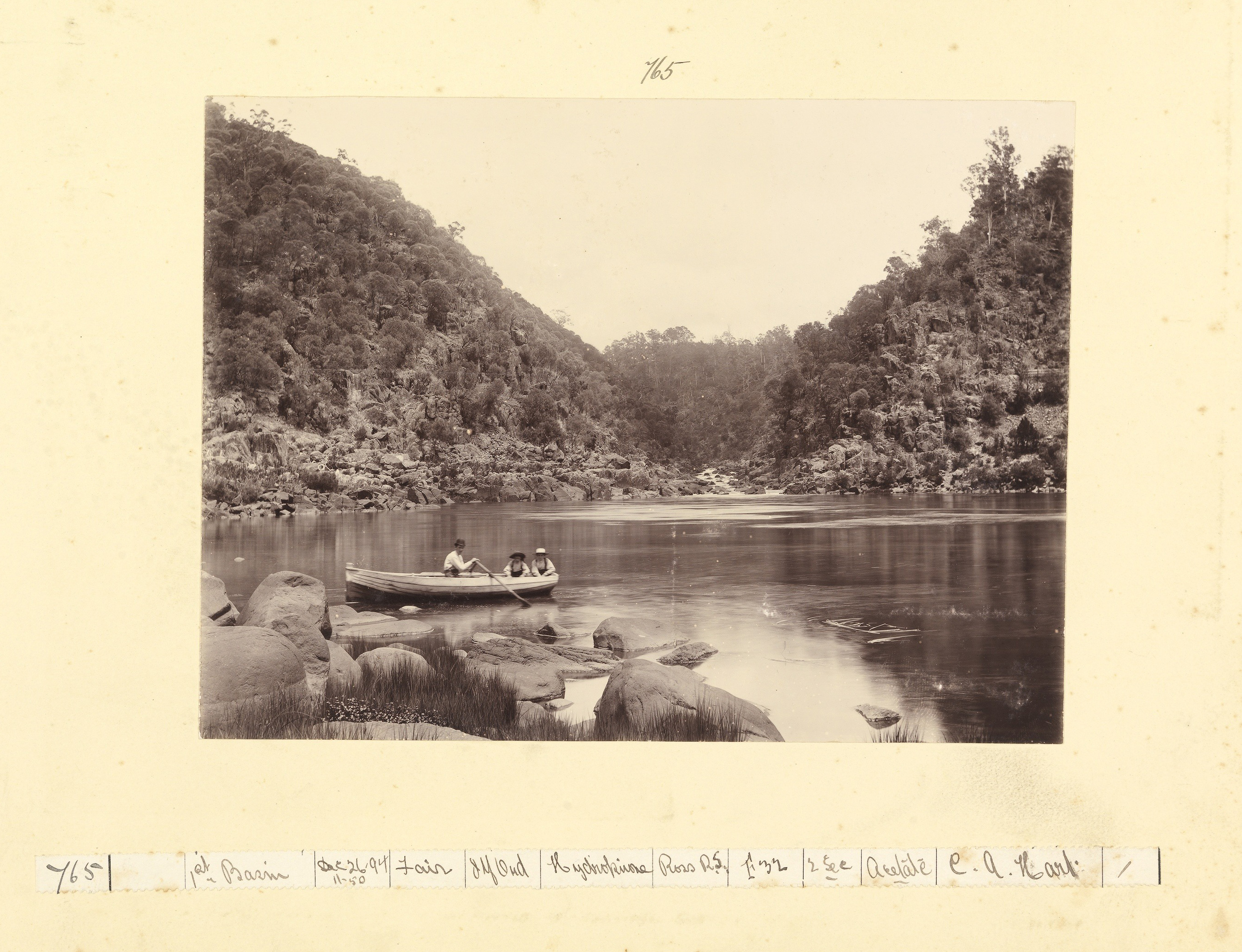
The first basin in 1895

A pathway, known as the King’s Bridge-Cataract Walk, and originally built by volunteers in the 1890s, runs along the north bank of the Cataract Gorge, and is a popular tourist destination. The original toll house at which pedestrians had to pay to enter the walk can still be seen near King's Bridge on the northern edge of the gorge.

The chairlift is the longest single-span chairlift in the world, with the longest span being 308 m (1,010 ft). The chairlift, built in 1972, has a total span of 457 m (1,499 ft).

The Duck Reach Power Station, the first publicly owned hydroelectric power station in Australia, now a technology museum, is located approximately 2.5 kilometres (1.6 mi) from a suspension bridge that was built in 1904. Completed in 1895, the power station initially provided power for Launceston's street lights and then for commercial and domestic use. The station was severely damaged in the floods of 1929, rebuilt in 1932, and then decommissioned when the Trevallyn Dam was finished in 1955.

In the late 1970s it was the intention of entrepreneur Roger Smith to build a tramway from his theme park and motel the Penny Royal, just outside the entrance to the Gorge, to a 'Gunpowder Mill and Arsenal' in the Gorge reserve. However, the Penny Royal's attendances declined in the 1990s and this aspect of the project was not effected. The Penny Royal continues to function as a theme park and hotel.

== Features ==
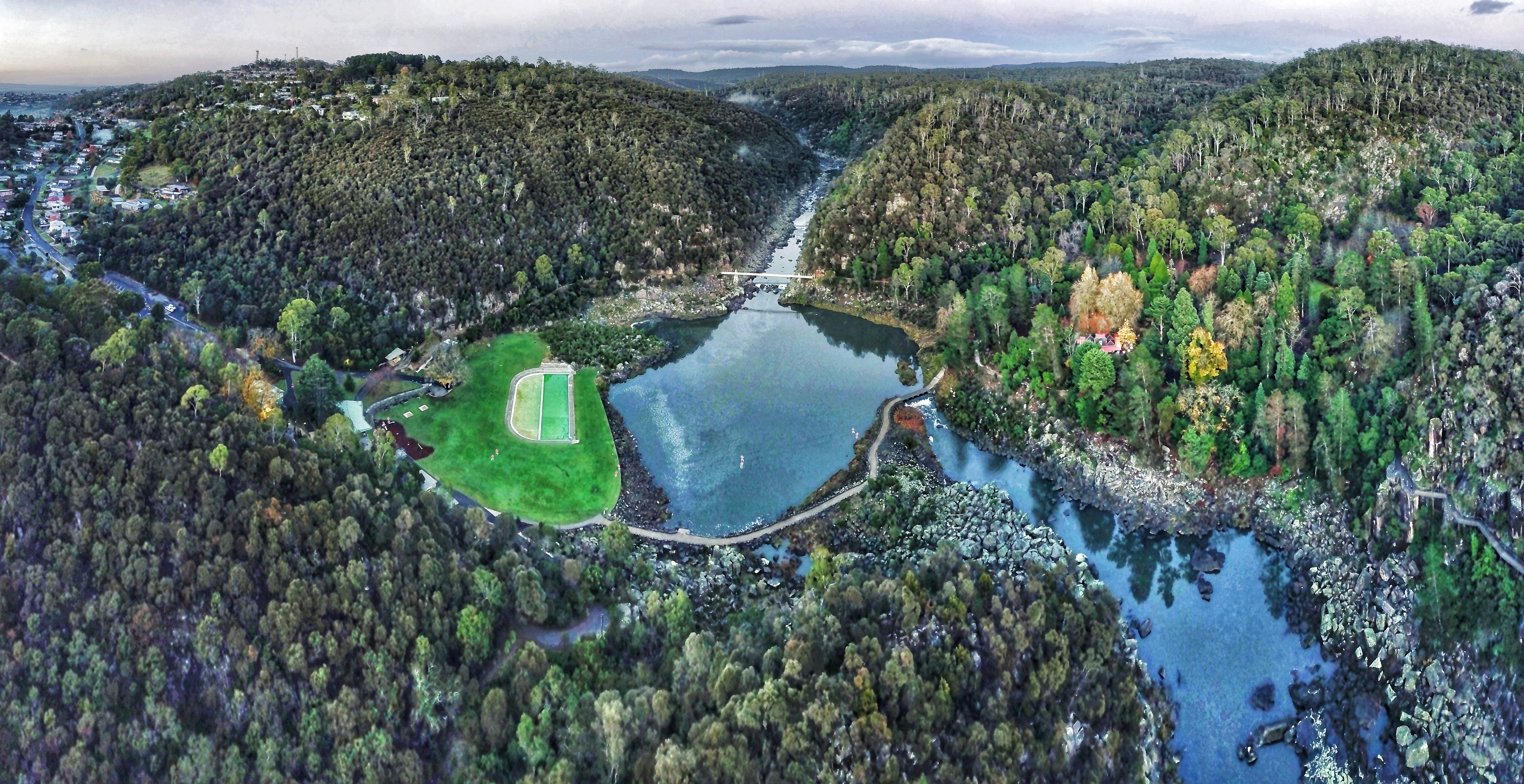
Aerial perspective of Cataract Gorge Reserve

The First Basin on the southern side features a swimming pool, the aforementioned chairlift, two cafés, an inclinator and an open area surrounded by bushland. At the bottom of the inclinator is a small cottage which contains photographs and paintings of the basin and downriver Gorge. The basin itself has created many of myths about its depth: some locals say it is a bottomless pit; a volcanic plug; or that a submarine sent in to find its bottom during the 1960s ran out cable before accomplishing this feat. In fact, the basin was formed by erosion at the intersection of two faults - the Basin Road Fault and an unnamed fault approximately at right angles which the South Esk is following. Where the two faults meet, the Dolerite rock is badly shattered and hence more easily eroded, giving rise to the formation of the basin.

Measurements in 2016 found the maximum depth is 20.5 metres (67 ft).

The northern side, named the Cliff Grounds, is a landscaped Victorian garden containing ferns, exotic plants and peacocks. It is now provided with facilities for visitors.

Further upstream is the historic Duck Reach Power Station, now an Interpretation Centre. The Launceston City Council originally commissioned the Power Station in 1893, making it the largest hydro-electric scheme of its day. By 1895 it was lighting the city.

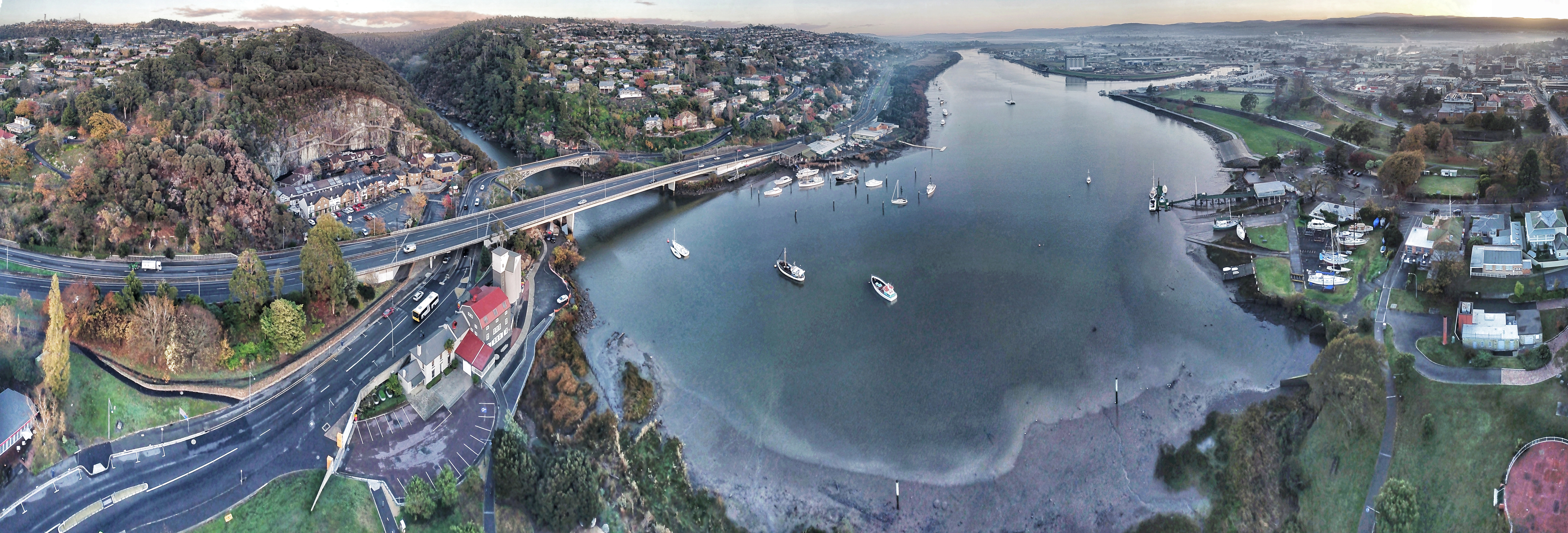
Aerial perspective of Cataract Gorge and the Tamar River

Other activities include boat cruises through the accessible section of river. Tamar River Cruises operates a 50-minute Cataract Gorge cruise departing from Home Point, Launceston, travelling through the city's waterfront precinct and into the gorge aboard the Lady Launceston.

Prior to the development of the Trevallyn Dam there were three lesser basins upstream of the "First Basin", with the second and third still visible on a map, while the fourth is flooded by Lake Trevallyn.

At the lower end of the gorge, the South Esk spills into the Tamar River going under King's Bridge and Paterson Bridge which was built more recently. King's Bridge was the only bridge leading north out of the city for nearly 100 years. The Paterson Bridge was officially opened on November 2, 1973.

This section of river is a well recognised section of whitewater. It provides world class kayaking. An inaugural race is usually scheduled in late January, thanks to Hydro Tasmania.

== Gallery ==
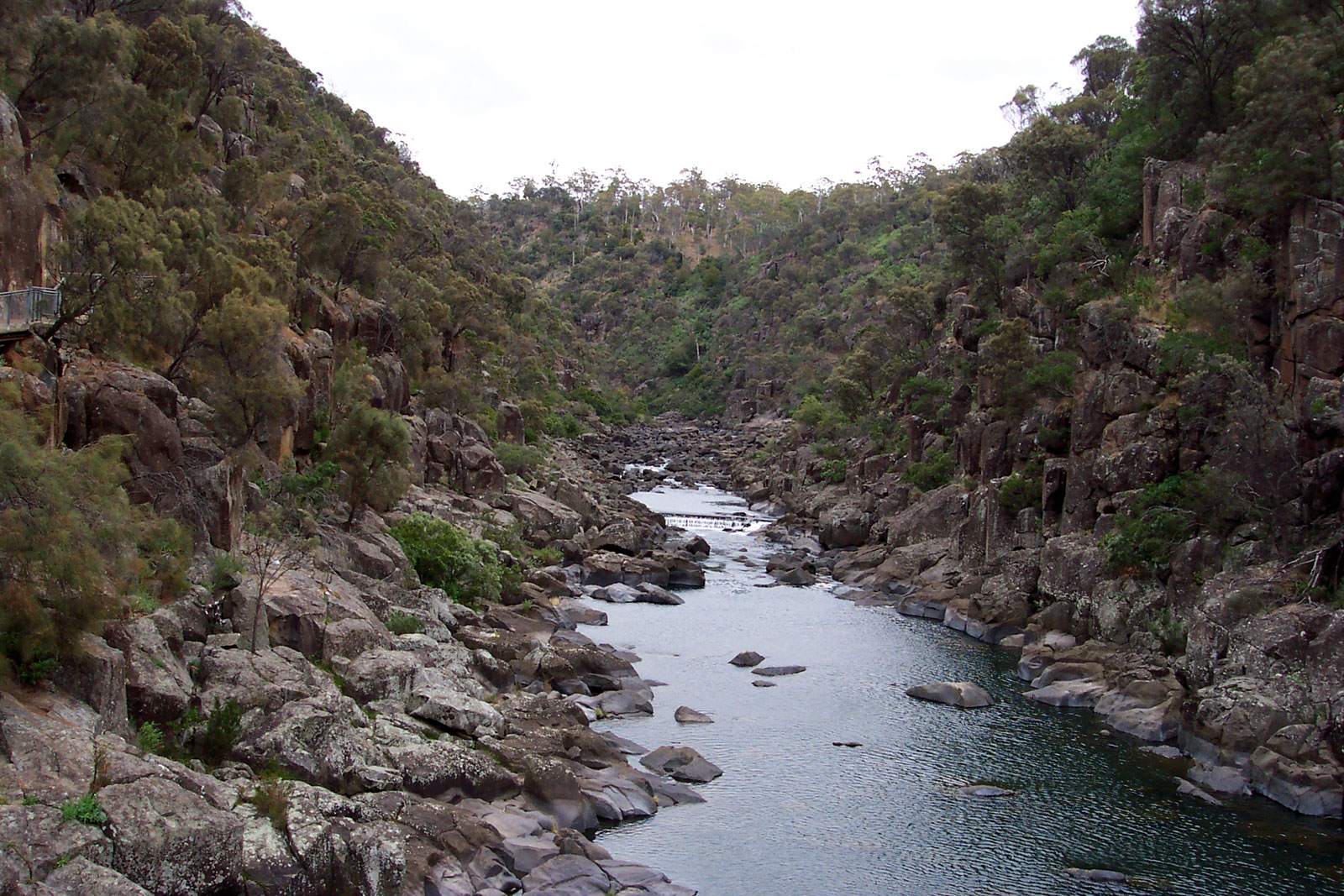
Picture of Cataract Gorge taken from the suspension bridge

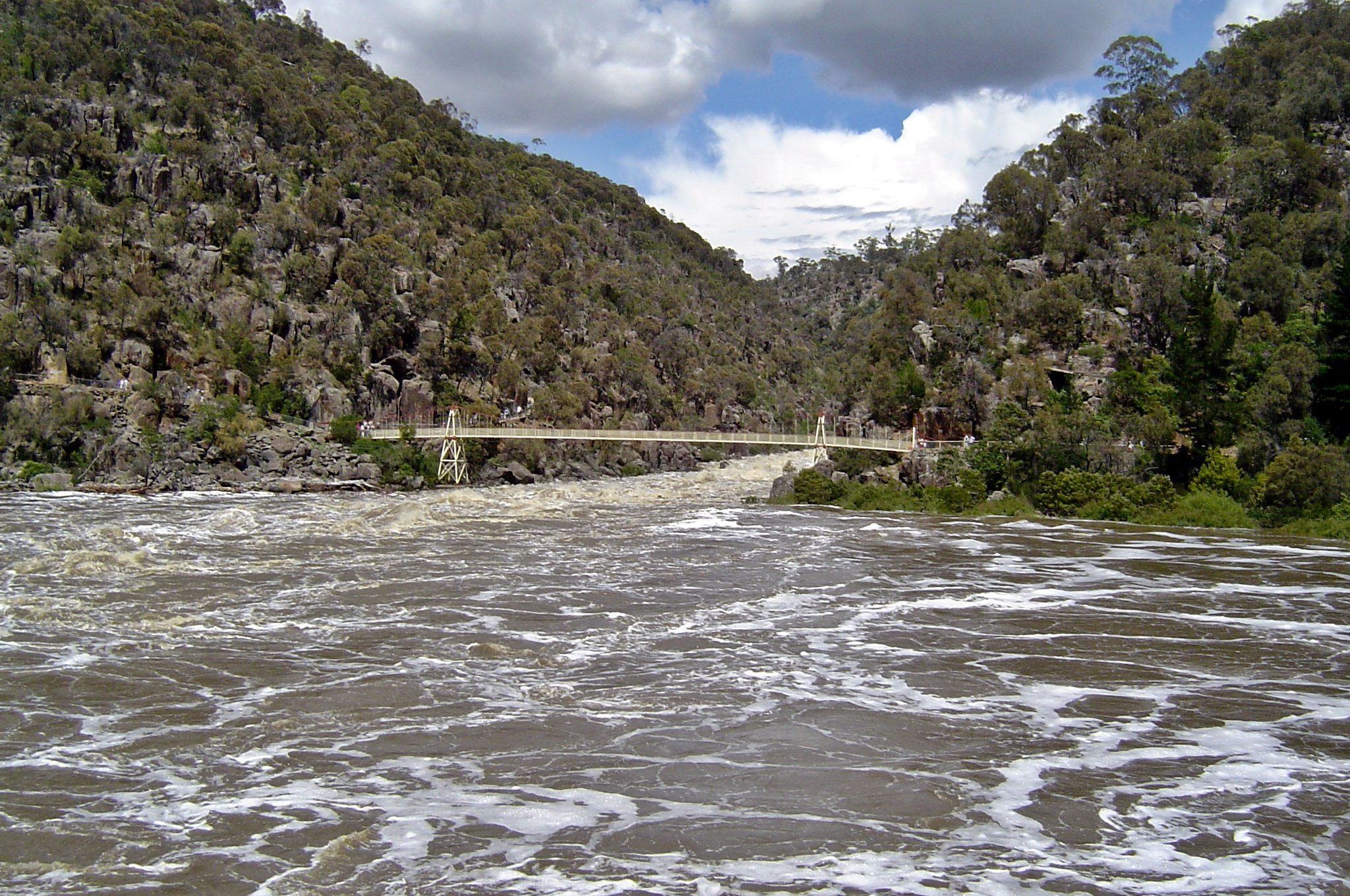
South Esk River in flood at the Gorge

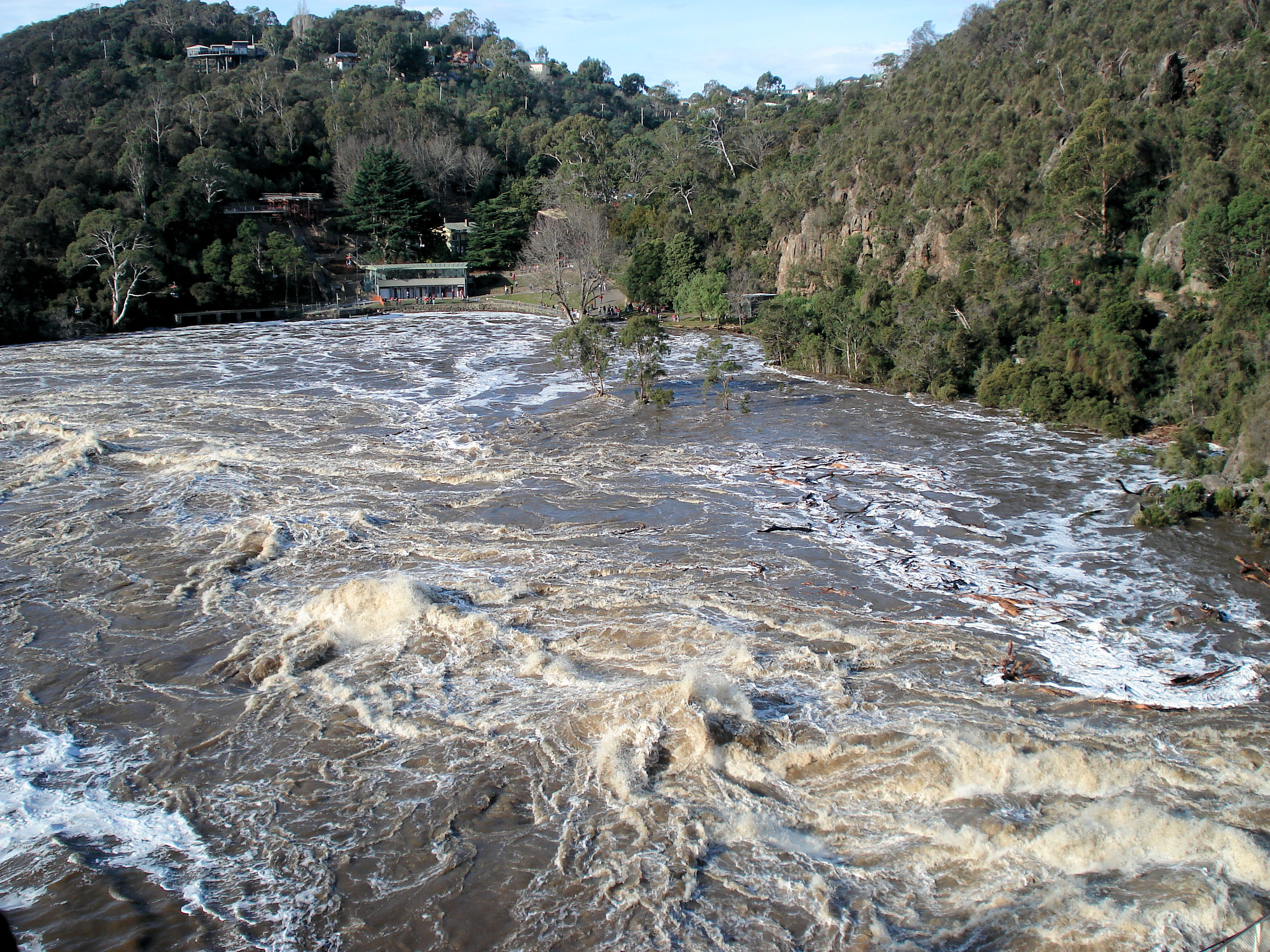
South Esk River in flood at the Gorge, August 2009

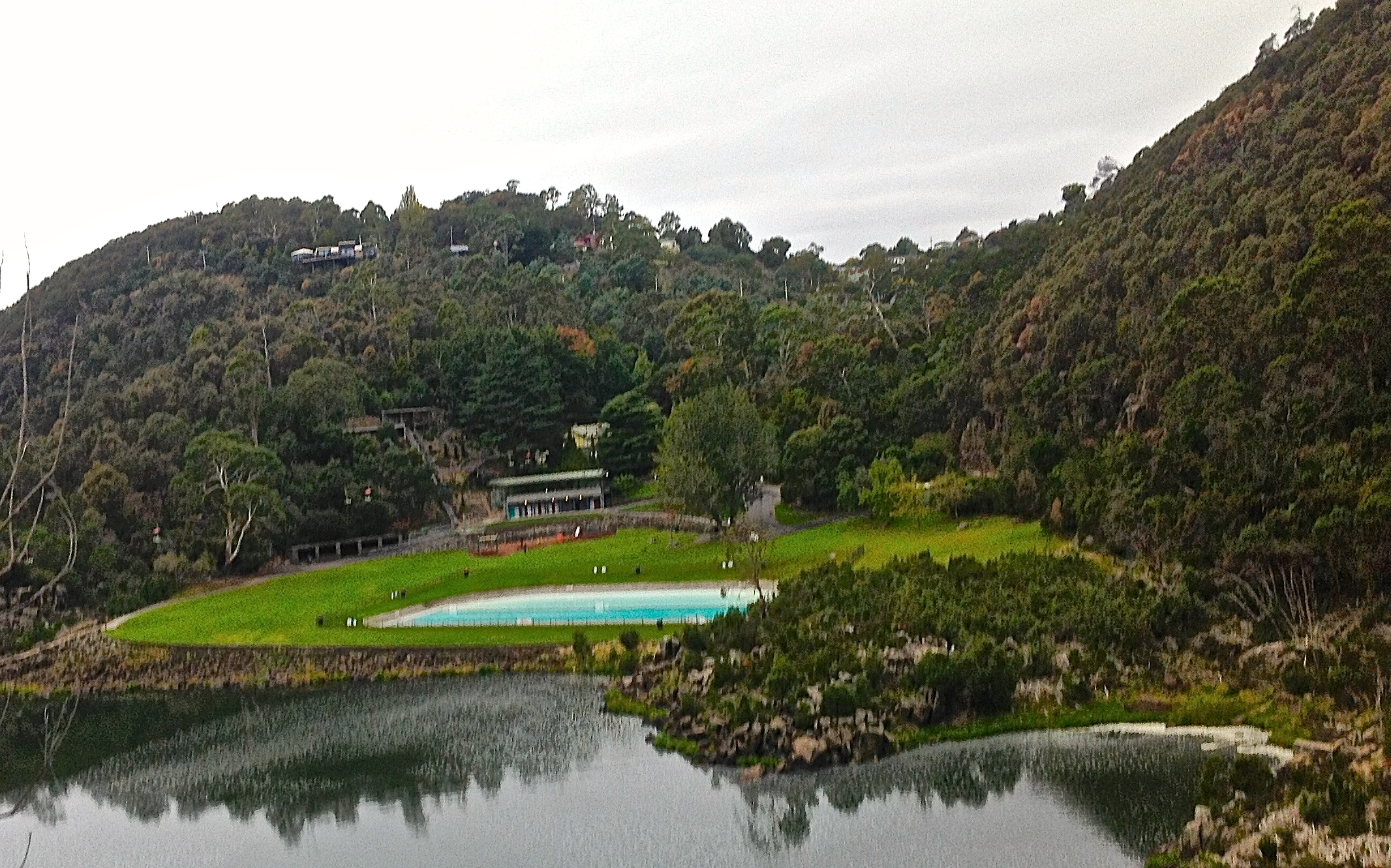
View of first Basin

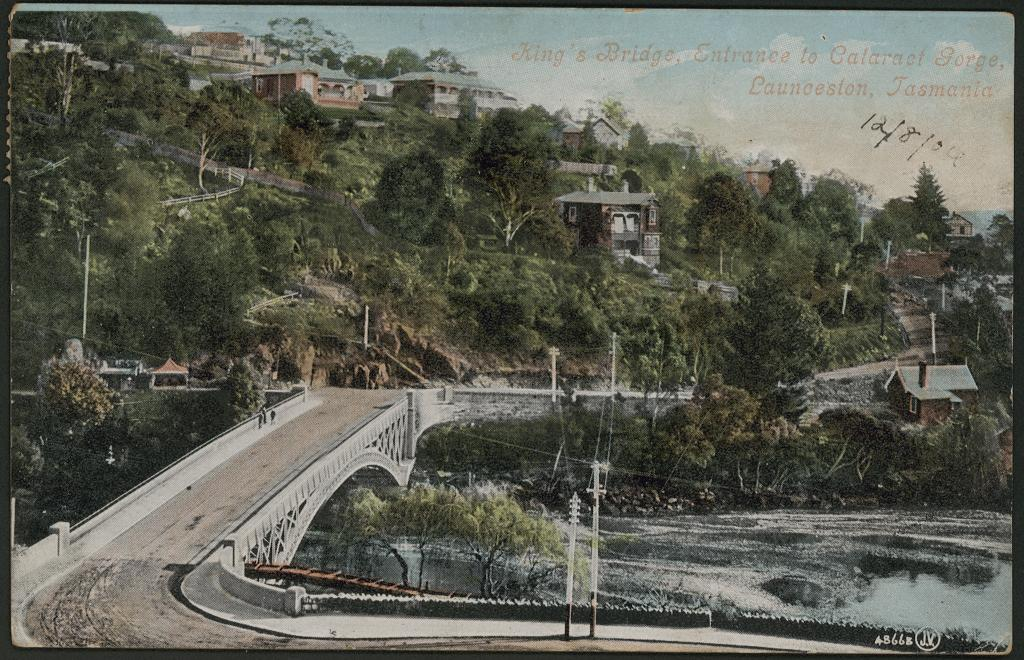
King's Bridge

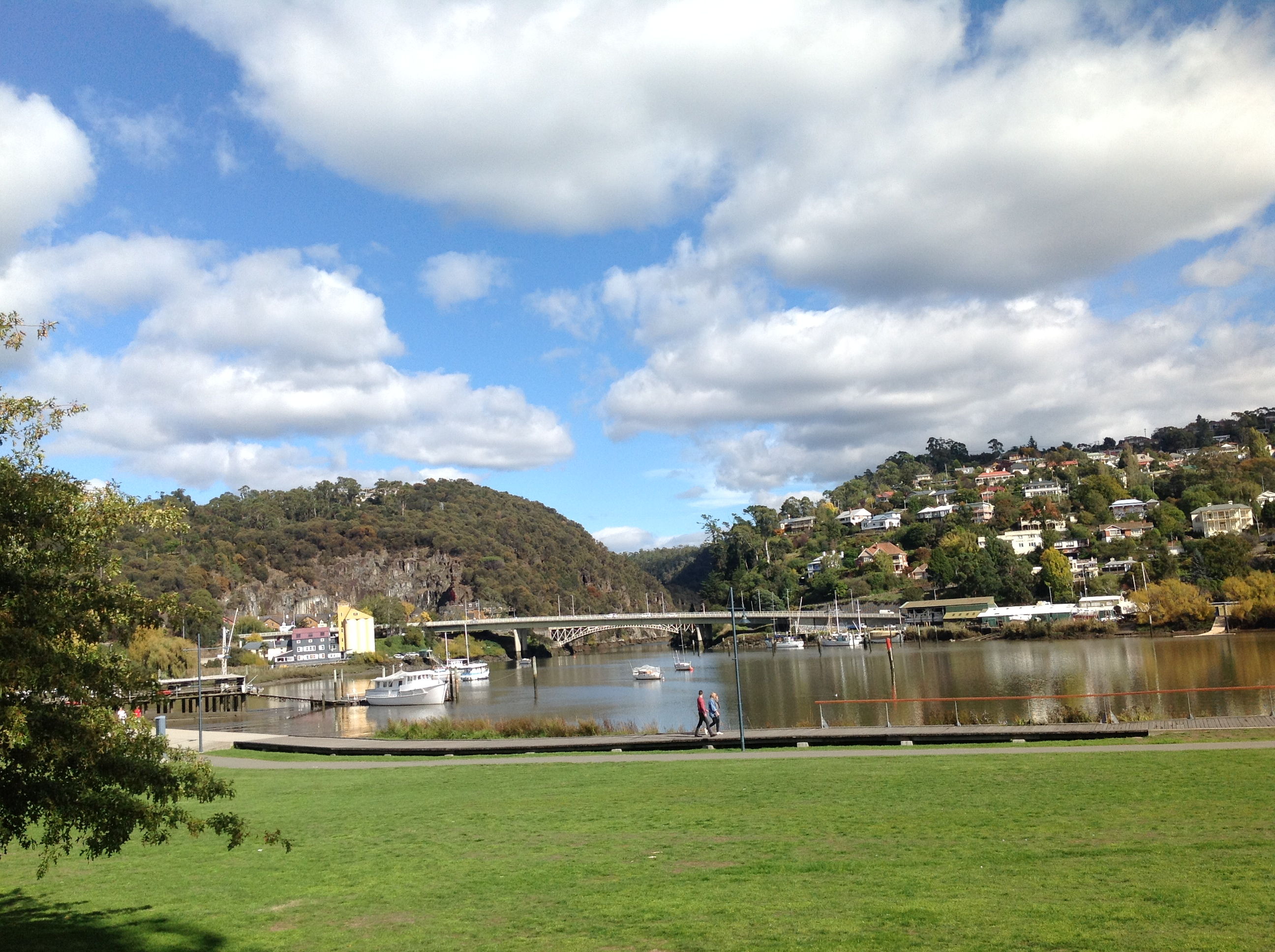
View of Cataract Gorge

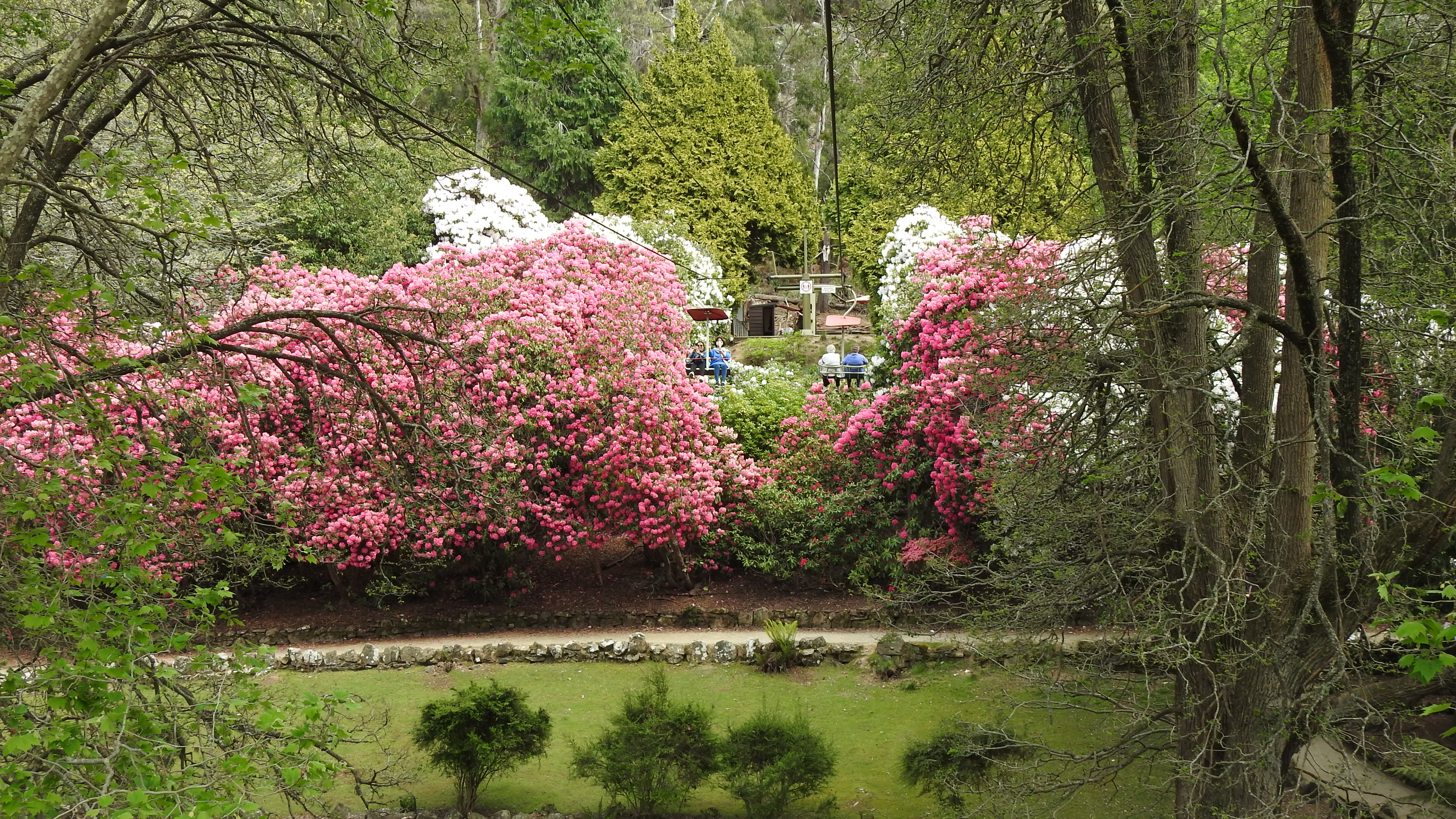
Cataract Gorge in spring

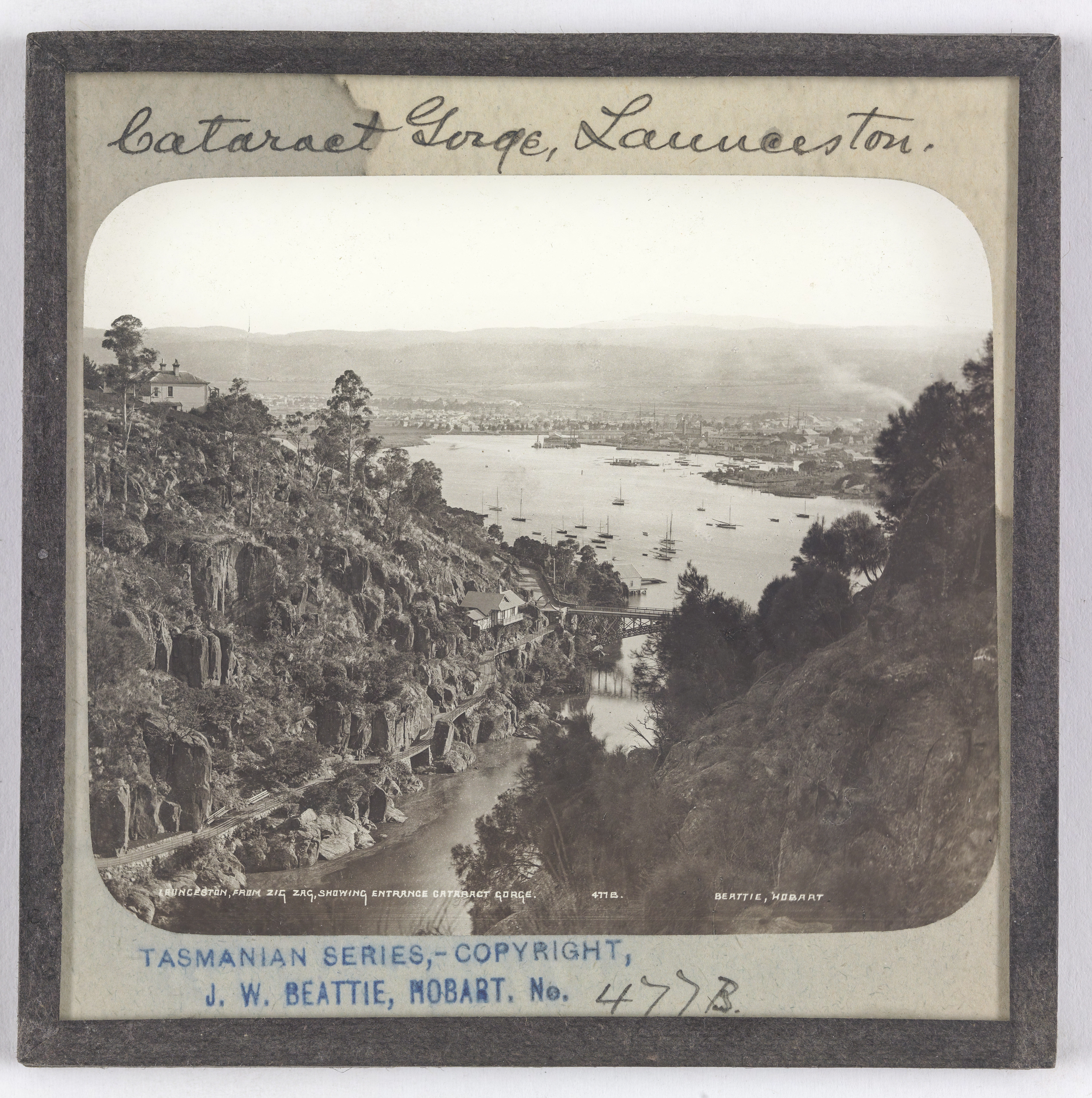
The Cataract Gorge in the early 1900s, John Watt Beattie
