= David Charles =

David Charles or Dave Charles may refer to:

- David Atiba Charles (born 1977), footballer
- David Charles (Australian politician) (born 1948)
- David Charles (hymn-writer) (1762–1834), Welsh hymn-writer
- David Charles (minister) (1812–1878), Methodist cleric involved in Trevecca College and University College of Wales, Aberystwyth
- David Charles (philosopher) (1947–2026), professor of philosophy at the University of Oxford
- David Charles (public servant), Australian senior public servant and consultant
- David Charles (physician) (born 1964), neurologist
- Dave Charles, British drummer, recording engineer and record producer

== See also ==
- Charles David (disambiguation)
