= Miena Rockfill Dam =

Dam and power station in Tasmania, Australia

- Location of the dam in Tasmania
- Interactive map of Miena Rockfill Dam
- Country: Australia
- Location: Central Highlands, Tasmania
- Coordinates: 41°58′51″S 146°43′56″E
- Purpose: Power
- Status: Operational
- Opening date: 1916: Miena Dam No. 1; 1922: Miena Dam No. 2; 1967: Miena Rockfill Dam
- Owner: Hydro Tasmania

Dam and spillways
- Type of dam: Rock-fill dam
- Impounds: Shannon River
- Height: 28 m (92 ft)
- Length: 1,136 m (3,727 ft)
- Dam volume: 481×10^{3} m^{3} (17.0×10^{6} cu ft)
- Spillways: 1
- Spillway type: Controlled
- Spillway capacity: 58 cubic metres per second (2,000 cu ft/s)

Reservoir
- Creates: Great Lake / Yingina
- Total capacity: 3,156.64 GL (2,559,130 acre⋅ft)
- Catchment area: 399 km^{2} (154 sq mi)
- Surface area: 1,761.2 ha (4,352 acres)
- Normal elevation: 1,036 m (3,399 ft) AHD

Poatina Power Station
- Coordinates: 41°48′42″S 146°55′08″E
- Operator: Hydro Tasmania
- Commission date: 1966; 1977; 2008; 2010
- Type: Conventional
- Hydraulic head: 758 m (2,487 ft)
- Turbines: 5 x 51.6 MW (69,200 hp) Andritz Pelton-type; 1 x 54.5 MW (73,100 hp) Fuji Pelton-type
- Installed capacity: 313 MW (420,000 hp)
- Capacity factor: 0.8
- Annual generation: 1,255 GWh (4,520 TJ)
- Website hydro.com.au

Tasmanian Heritage Register
- Official name: Great Lake Scheme
- Designated: 2014
- Reference no.: 11943

The Miena Rockfill Dam is a rock-filled embankment dam across the Shannon River, located near Miena, in the Central Highlands region of Tasmania, Australia. Completed in 1967, the dam flooded the Great Lake, (Note: Officially yingina / Great Lake, from its Tasmanian Aboriginal name.) a natural freshwater lake, and created an expanded, yet shallow, reservoir, established for the purpose of generation of hydroelectricity via the adjacent Poatina Power Station, a conventional hydroelectric power station.

The dam, its reservoir, and the power station are owned and operated by Hydro Tasmania.

== Dam and reservoir overview ==
The existing dam is the third dam built to impound the waters of the Great Lake. Initially called the Great Lake Scheme, (Note: Also known as the Shannon-Ouse Scheme.) the aim was to develop hydroelectricity using the resources of the naturally-formed freshwater lake. The original 1920s infrastructure is listed on the Tasmanian Heritage Register; and was, in 2001, awarded a Historic Engineering Marker by Engineers Australia as part of the Engineering Heritage Recognition Program.

=== Dam history ===
Miena Dam No. 1

The earliest suggestions of damming the Great Lake for hydroelectricity date from 1897, although, by 1904, the proposals became feasible. In 1909, it was identified that power was needed to smelt zinc ores from Broken Hill. A private company was approved to develop the scheme to divert the Shannon River into the nearby Ouse River – a drop of approximately 300 metres (980 ft). Whilst construction commenced in 1910, capital to fund the project was limited. In 1914, the Tasmanian Government took over the works in progress and its structure became the forerunner to the Hydro-Electric Department, later the Hydro Electric Commission, and now, Hydro Tasmania. The first dam, called the Miena Dam No. 1, was commissioned in 1916, to supply water for the generational of hydroelectricity at the Waddamana Power Station. The power station had capacity of 7 megawatts (9,400 hp) and the transmission line supplied the City of Hobart.

Miena Dam No. 2

As demand for power grew, the initial dam was expanded by a second dam, called the Miena Dam No. 2. This multiple arch buttress dam was completed in 1922. It was the first dam in Australia constructed of reinforced concrete. The dam wall was 12 metres (39 ft) high and 360 metres (1,180 ft) long. Water from the Great Lake was used to supply the Waddamana Power Station that had increased capacity to 49 megawatts (66,000 hp). The No. 2 dam wall was submerged, following construction of the 1967 rock-filled dam.

Miena Rockfill Dam

The third and current dam, called the Miena Rockfill Dam, was completed in 1967, located downstream of the No. 2 dam. This earthen rock-filled dam wall is 28 metres (92 ft) high and 1,136 metres (3,727 ft) long. When full, the expanded Great Lake has capacity of 3,156.64 gigalitres (2,559,130 acre⋅ft) and covers 1,761.2 hectares (4,352 acres), drawn from a catchment area of 399 square kilometres (154 sq mi). The controlled spillway has a flow capacity of 58 cubic metres per second (2,000 cu ft/s). An additional dam wall was raised in 1982, to replace the earlier 1967 dam wall.

=== Reservoir ===
A naturally formed and shallow lake, the reservoir has been dammed several times for the purposes of generating hydroelectricity. The Great Lake supports three power stations, including the Poatina, Tods Corner, and Trevallyn power stations. Additionally, the Great Lake also supports irrigation of 35 square kilometres (14 sq mi) of adjacent farmland. An enhancement of the irrigation scheme, expected to deliver 25 gigalitres (20,000 acre⋅ft), commenced in 2024 and was expected to be completed in late 2026.

== Hydroelectric power station ==
Located in the Great Lake and South Esk catchment area, the Poatina Power Station makes use of a 900-metre (3,000 ft) descent from the Great Western Tiers to the Norfolk Plains in Tasmania's northern Midlands. Water from the Great Lake is diverted via a tunnel to the edge of the Great Western Tiers where it plummets down a viable penstock line, which enters the ground again near the power station. The station is located 150 metres (490 ft) underground in a massive artificial cavern – hence the name Poatina, meaning "cavern" or "cave" in Palawa. The headrace tunnel and penstocks were bored through mudstone with the aid of a Robbins Mole. Water leaves the power station via a roughly 4-kilometre (2.5 mi) long tailrace tunnel and discharges into the Macquarie River via Brumbies Rivulet.

The Poatina Power Station was commissioned in 1964, and replaced the Waddamana and Shannon power stations. The small construction village of Poatina sits perched on top of a low plateau, 3.5 kilometres (2.2 mi) from the station's subterranean location.

The power station has six vertical shaft generating sets, five Boving 51.6-megawatt (69,200 hp) Pelton-type turbines of which three are upgraded Andritz turbines and one Fuji 54.5-megawatt (73,100 hp) Pelton-type turbine with a combined generating capacity of 300 megawatts (400,000 hp). The station output, estimated at 1,255 gigawatt-hours (4,520 TJ) annually, is fed via underground circuit breakers to two 16 kV/110 kV and four 16 kV/220 kV generator transformers located in the switchyard above, and then to TasNetworks' transmission grid at the Palmerston Substation 4-kilometre (2.5 mi) to the east. As of April 2025, Poatina Power Station was the second largest hydroelectric station in Tasmania, measured by generating capacity.

=== 21st-century developments ===
In early 2016, as a result of an ongoing water shortage in Tasmania's hydro system, the output generated by the Poatina Power Station dropped to one-fifth of capacity.

In June 2020, Hydro Tasmania awarded a contract to Andritz AG to begin replacement of ageing infrastructure, most of which was sixty years old. Estimated to cost approximately A$200 million, the first stage of the project involved replacement of four of the Pelton-type turbines with four 60-megawatt (80,000 hp) Andritz turbines, together with improved electronic monitoring, completed in 2024. A second contact to Andritz AG, awarded in 2023, was to replace another turbine with a 60-watt (0.080 hp) Andritz turbine.

In a separate venture in 2023, Neoen, a multi-national company based in France, proposed the installation of two grid batteries, located approximately 5 kilometres (3.1 mi) east of the power station. Expected to be completed in two stages by 2027, the batteries will store a combined 380 megawatts (510,000 hp)/860 megawatt-hours (3,100 GJ). An additional battery storage facility, proposed by Akaysha Energy, is expected to deliver 100 megawatts (130,000 hp)/200 megawatt-hours (720 GJ).

== See also ==
- List of power stations in Tasmania
  - Waddamana Power Stations
- List of reservoirs and dams in Tasmania
