= King's Bridge (Launceston) =

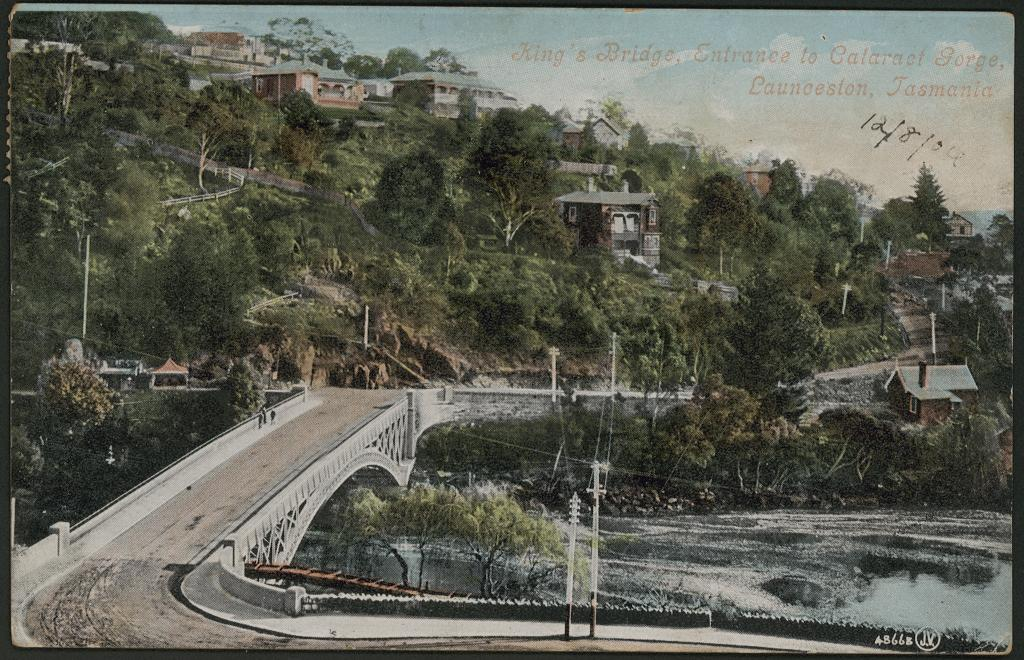
- Coordinates: 41°26′25″S 147°07′38″E
- Crosses: South Esk River
- Locale: Launceston, Tasmania

Characteristics
- Design: arch
- Material: Wrought iron
- Total length: 220 feet (67.1 m)
- Longest span: 190 feet (57.9 m)
- No. of spans: 1
- Piers in water: 0
- No. of lanes: 2

History
- Architect: William Thomas Doyne
- Fabrication by: Charles de Bergue, Manchester with additional span by Salisburys, Launceston
- Opened: 1864
- Inaugurated: 4 February 1864
- Rebuilt: 1904

King's Bridge is a wrought-iron bridge crossing the South Esk River at the mouth of the Cataract Gorge in Launceston, Tasmania.

Construction of the bridge began in 1864. The bridge span was constructed in Manchester, England and was transported to Launceston for final assembly. At the time it was named the Cataract or South Esk Bridge and it was the only form of vehicular crossing of that river in Launceston.

In 1904, a second, parallel span was added to widen the bridge. This span was almost identical to the original span, but was fabricated locally in Launceston, instead of overseas.

== Engineering heritage award ==
The received a Historic Engineering Marker from Engineers Australia as part of its Engineering Heritage Recognition Program.
