= Trevallyn Dam =

Dam and hydroelectric power station in Tasmania

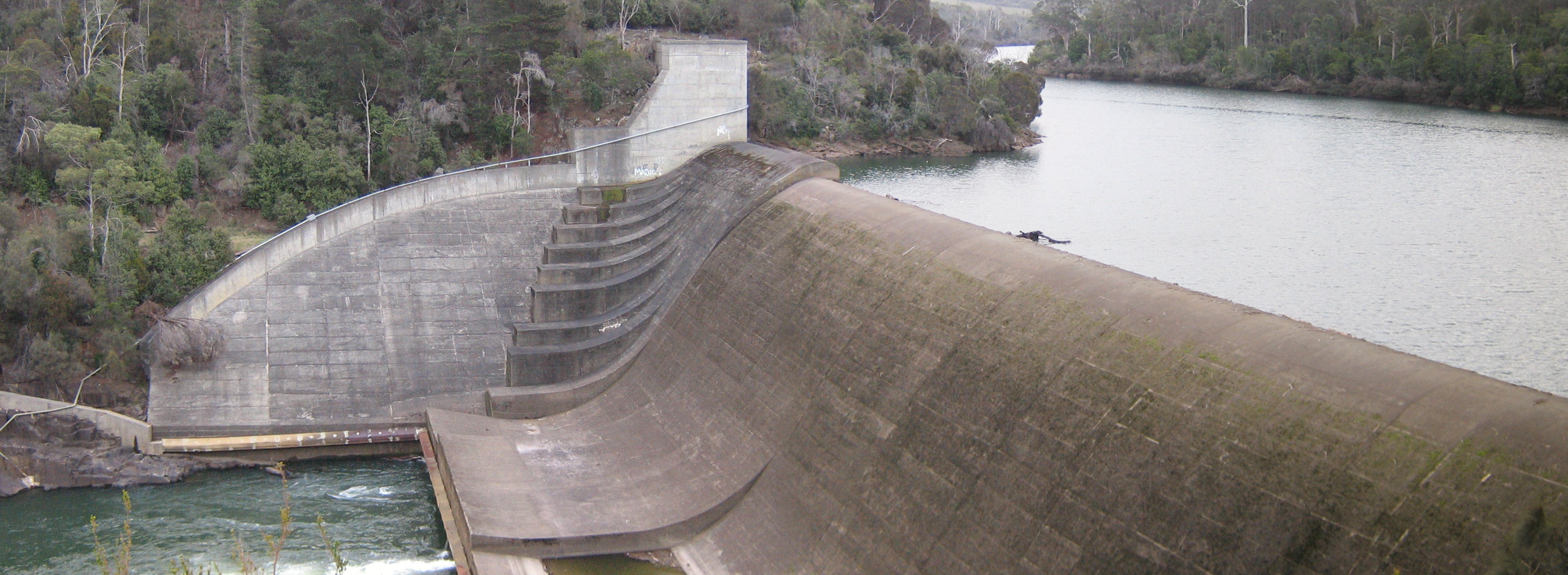
- Trevallyn Dam in 2009

- Location of the dam in Tasmania
- Interactive map of Trevallyn Dam
- Country: Australia
- Location: Launceston, Northern Midlands, Tasmania
- Coordinates: 41°26′52″S 147°5′11″E
- Purpose: Power
- Status: Operational
- Opening date: 1955
- Operator: Hydro Tasmania

Dam and spillways
- Type of dam: Gravity dam
- Impounds: South Esk River
- Height: 33 m (108 ft)
- Length: 177 m (581 ft)
- Dam volume: 61×10^{3} m^{3} (2.2×10^{6} cu ft)
- Spillways: 1
- Spillway type: Uncontrolled
- Spillway capacity: 8,500 m^{3}/s (300,000 cu ft/s)

Reservoir
- Creates: Lake Trevallyn
- Total capacity: 12,330 ML (10,000 acre⋅ft)
- Catchment area: 8,986 km^{2} (3,470 sq mi)
- Surface area: 148 ha (370 acres)
- Maximum width: 390 m (1,280 ft)
- Normal elevation: 124 m (407 ft) AHD

Trevallyn Power Station
- Coordinates: 41°25′12″S 147°06′36″E
- Operator: Hydro Tasmania
- Commission date: 1955
- Type: Run-of-the-river
- Hydraulic head: 130 m (430 ft)
- Turbines: 2 x 20.9 MW (28,000 hp); 2 x 27 MW (36,000 hp); (all English Electric Francis-type)
- Installed capacity: 95.8 MW (128,500 hp)
- Capacity factor: 0.8
- Annual generation: 492 GWh (1,770 TJ)
- Website hydro.com.au

The Trevallyn Dam is a gravity dam across the South Esk River in Launceston, Tasmania, Australia. Completed in 1955, the resultant reservoir, Lake Trevallyn, was established for the purpose of generating hydroelectricity within the northern Midlands and West Tamar region. The Trevallyn Power Station is a run-of-the-river hydroelectric power station, owned and operated by Hydro Tasmania.

== Dam and reservoir overview ==
The Trevallyn Dam is a concrete gravity dam built on dolerite bedrock. The dam wall is 33 metres (108 ft) high and is 177 metres (581 ft) long. When full, Lake Trevallyn has a storage capacity of 12,330 megalitres (10,000 acre⋅ft) and covers a surface area of 148 hectares (370 acres), drawn from a catchment area of 8,986 square kilometres (3,470 sq mi). The spillway is 26.8 metres (88 ft) high. The reservoir also receives water from Great Lake via the Poatina Power Station.

=== Reservoir ===
Lake Trevallyn is the long, narrow lake created by the dam and extends as far as Hadspen where the first rapids begin at the junction of the Meander and South Esk rivers. The widest point on the lake is at Stephenson's Bay where it reaches 390 metres (1,280 ft) wide.

Launceston's outer suburb of Blackstone Heights and part of the Trevallyn State Recreation Area form part of the shore of Lake Trevallyn. Land around the lake is a mixture of suburbs, agricultural land and dry eucalypt forest.

==== Facilities ====
The lake and some of the surrounding land is used as a recreation area. Most facilities are located at Aquatic Point which include a boat launching ramp, jetty and ski-jump. A walking track connects Aquatic Point to the dam wall and Trevallyn State Recreation Area. The dam wall features a viewing platform, parkland and barbecue facilities. Most areas of the lake are open to boating and fishing with the exception of waters near the dam and penstock intake.

==== Algal blooms ====
Lake Trevallyn is often prone to algal blooms in the warm summer months. The blooms are due to high nutrient levels from sewerage treatment and fertilizers, limited water movement and warm temperatures. The main species is Anabaena circinalis and though it has the potential to be toxic, no blooms recorded in the lake have proven to be toxic to date. Since 2007, a monitoring program has been in place to keep a check on algal levels and to notify authorities when blooms occur.

==== Jellyfish ====
In 2009, scientists discovered the freshwater jellyfish, Craspedacusta sowerbyi, in the waters of Lake Trevallyn close to Blackstone Heights. Believed to have been brought by migrating birds from China, the jellyfish were accidentally discovered during routine water testing. The jellyfish are non-venomous and translucent with average sizes around 2 centimetres (0.79 in) across. Though introduced, the jellyfish are believed to have a beneficial impact on the area as they consume the larvae of mosquitoes. A few specimens were temporarily displayed at the QVMAG in Launceston after the discovery was made.

== Hydroelectric power station ==
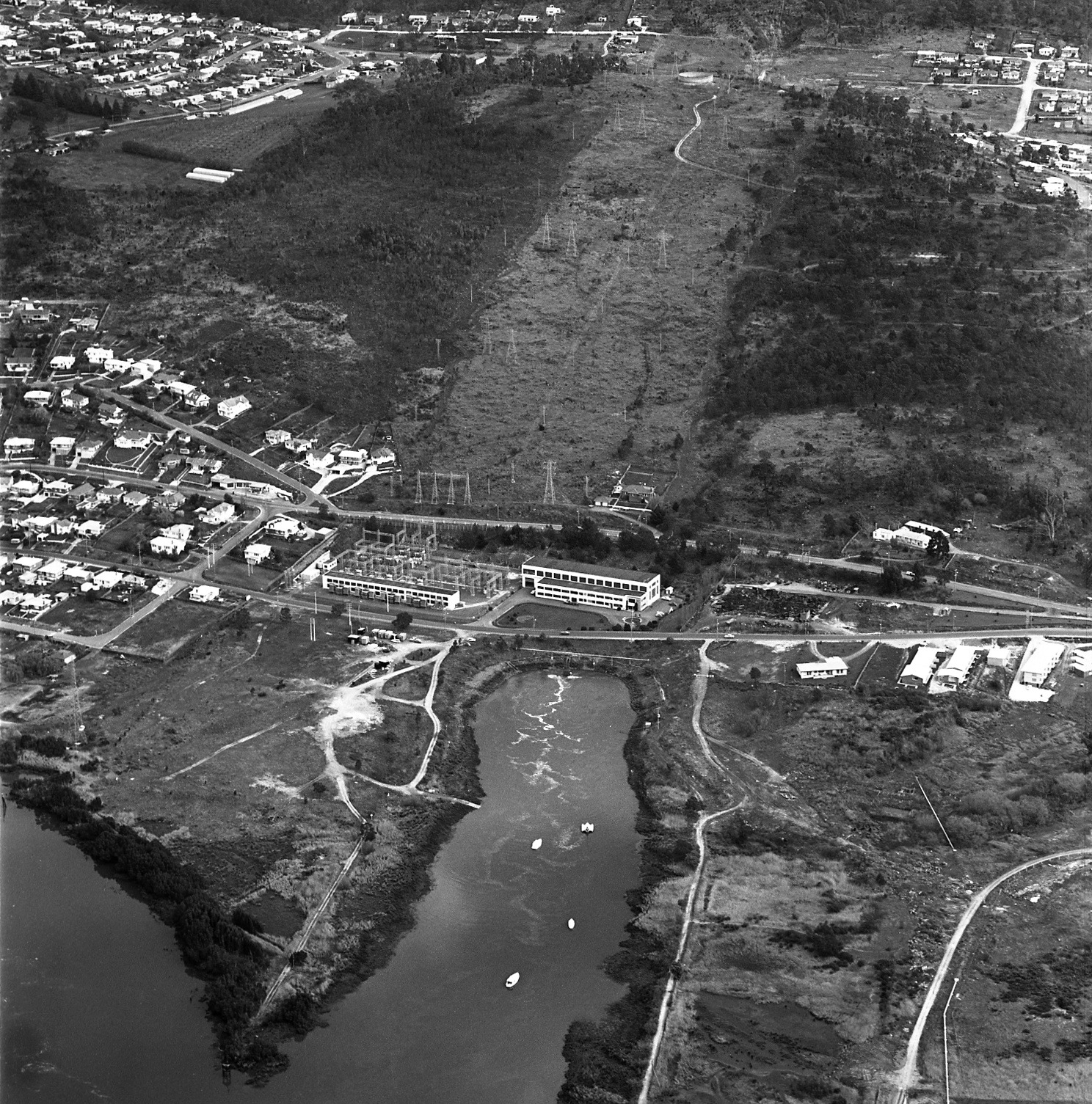
Trevallyn Power Station, c. 1970

Part of the Great Lake and South Esk scheme that comprises three hydroelectric power stations, the Trevallyn Power Station is the final station and is located adjacent to the Tamar River, north of Launceston, making use of daily flows down the South Esk River.

The dam diverts water through a 3.3-kilometre-long (2.1 mi) penstock pipeline to the power station. Water flows underground for its entirety except for a short, 100-metre-long (330 ft) portion that leaves the ground near Pitt Avenue due to a valley intersecting the tunnel's course. The pipeline splits underground into four smaller pipes immediately before entering the station's turbines. The water enters the penstock tunnel 130 metres (430 ft) above sea level and leaves the power station at sea level, entering the Tamar River via the Tailrace Bay on Tie-Tree Bend.

The Trevallyn and Poatina power stations are the only hydroelectric power stations located in the drainage basin of the South Esk River. The tunnel through which the pipeline runs is cut through dolerite and was excavated by a French tunnelling company. The bay that the used water is discharged into was excavated using mostly steam driven equipment and tram ways with the two tailing mounds now forming the Tailrace Park (south side) and the Tailrace Convention Center (north side). The Tailrace Bay has been adapted to serve recreational purposed and also provides a safe anchorage for yachts.

The power station was commissioned in 1955 by the Hydro Electric Corporation (TAS) and replaced the Duck Reach Power Station. The station has two 20.9-megawatt (28,000 hp) English Electric Francis-type turbines and two 27-megawatt (36,000 hp) English Electric Francis-type turbines, with a combined generating capacity of 95.8 megawatts (128,500 hp) of electricity. Within the station building, each turbine has a fully embedded spiral casing. A main inlet valve is located in the station immediately upstream of each turbine for maintenance and security purposes. No. 1 and no. 2 machines are equipped with a turbine relief (bypass) valve to reduce pressure rise in the turbine and penstock during rapid guide vane closure. The station output, estimated to be 492 gigawatt-hours (1,770 TJ) annually, is fed to TasNetworks' transmission grid via two three-phase Alstom generator transformers and two 3-phase English Electric generator transformers to the outdoor switchyard.

Water is discharged into the Tamar River at sea level by an open tailrace channel.

The construction village, named Marrawaylee, is now part of the suburb of West Riverside and is accessed by Pomona Road. The power station and the open land for the transmission lines now serve as a border between the Launceston suburbs of Riverside and Trevallyn.

== See also ==
- List of power stations in Tasmania
- List of reservoirs and dams in Tasmania
- List of run-of-the-river hydroelectric power stations
