= Charles Walter David Jr. =

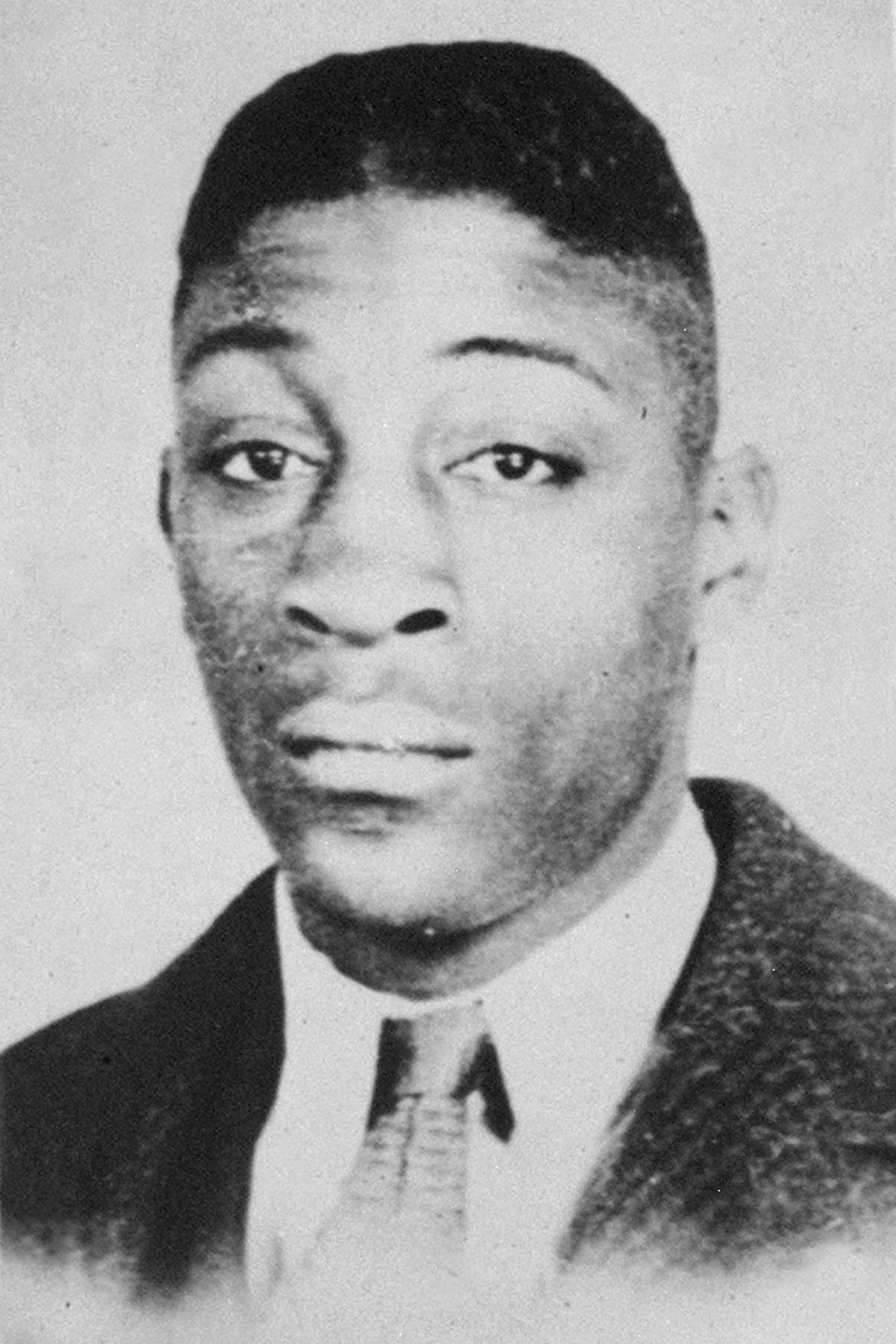
- Steward's Mate Charles Walter David Jr.
- Born: June 20, 1917
- Died: March 29, 1943 (aged 25)
- Burial place: Long Island National Cemetery, Farmingdale, New York
- Military career
- Branch: United States Coast Guard
- Rank: Steward's Mate First Class

Charles Walter David Jr. (June 20, 1917 – March 29, 1943), who served as a Steward's Mate in the United States Coast Guard, died of pneumonia after rescuing other sailors from the frigid North Atlantic. He was assigned to the USCGC Comanche during World War II, which was assigned to escort a convoy that included the Dorchester, a troop transport, when it was torpedoed by a U-boat off Greenland. David volunteered to dive into the frigid waters to rescue exhausted crew and passengers from the Dorchester. David also rescued several other Comanche crew members, who grew exhausted.

David came down with pneumonia after the exertion of the rescue, dying a few days later. He was posthumously awarded the Navy and Marine Corps Medal.

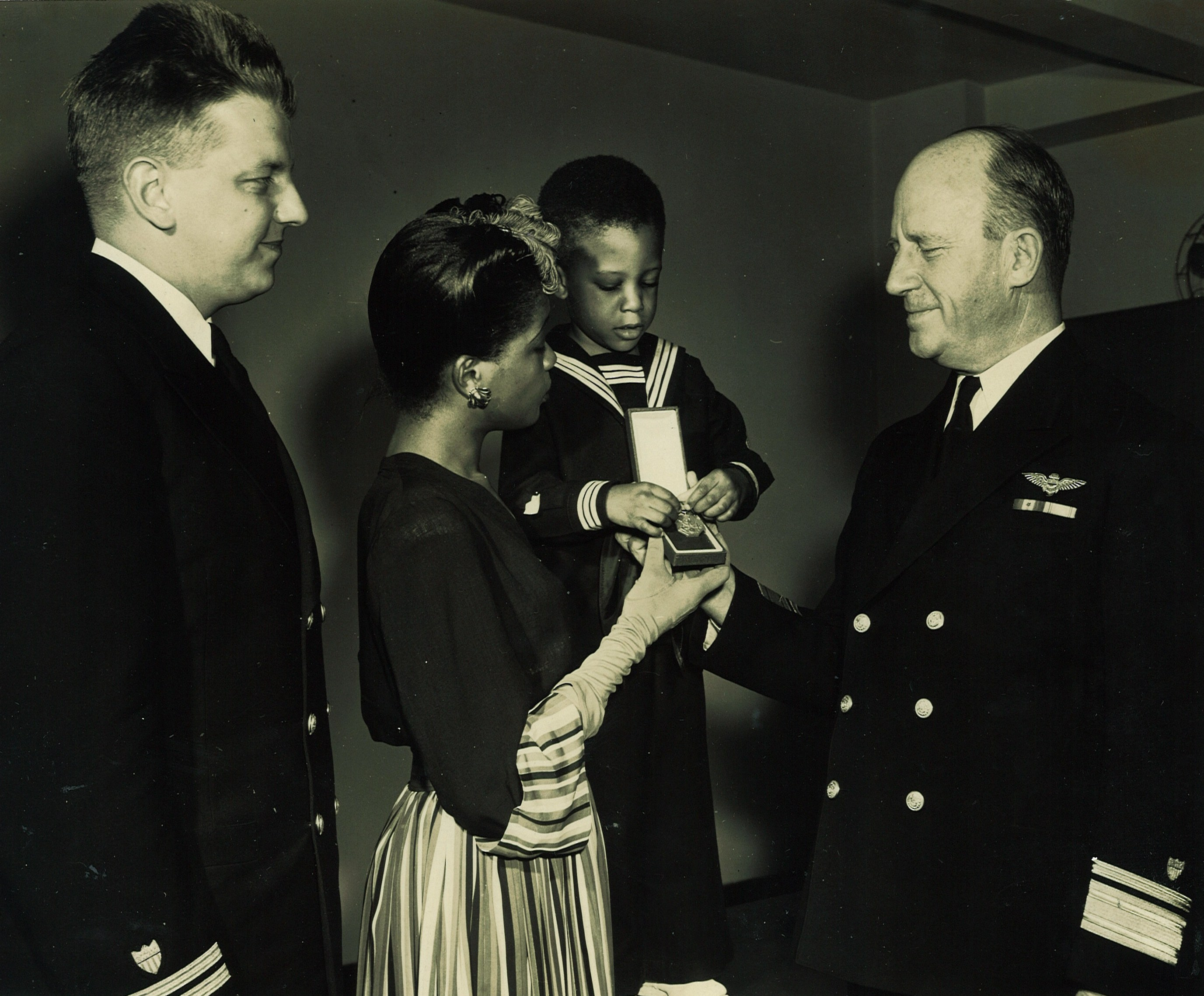
Kathleen (David's wife) and Neil (David's son) received David's Navy and Marine Corps medal.

David's widow Kathleen and young son Neil received the award on his behalf.

== USCGC Charles David Jr ==
In 2010, when the Coast Guard decided that all the new Sentinel class cutters would be named after Coast Guard personnel who had been recognized for their heroism, David was one of those to be honored. The seventh cutter in the class is named USCGC Charles David Jr. She is the first Sentinel class cutter to be homeported in Key West, Florida.
