= Waddamana Power Stations =

Former power station and dam in Tasmania, Australia

Miena Dam No. 1
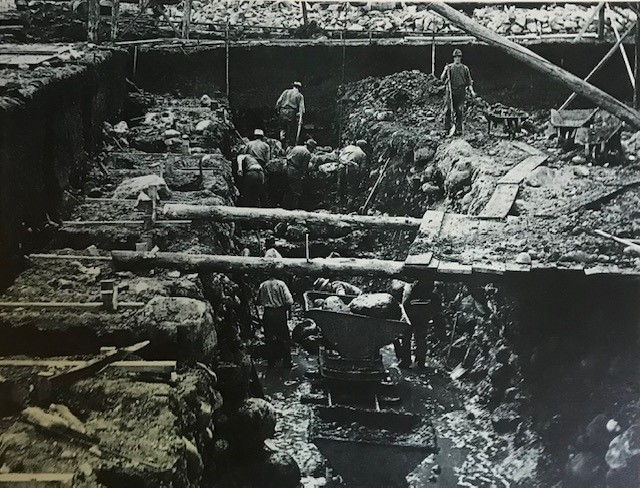
- Excavating the tailrace tunnel under Waddamana A, 1912

- Location of the former power stations, now museum, in Tasmania
- Interactive map of Miena Dam No. 1
- Country: Central Highlands, Tasmania
- Location: Australia
- Coordinates: 42°07′26″S 146°44′48″E
- Purpose: Power
- Status: Decommissioned
- Construction began: 1910
- Opening date: 6 May 1916
- Built by: Tasmanian Hydro-Electric Power and Metallurgical Co. (1910–1914); Tasmanian Hydro-Electric Department (1914–1915)
- Designed by: Charles Merz; William MacLennan; (consulting engineers); John Henry Butters
- Operator: Tasmanian Hydro-Electric Department

Dam and spillways
- Type of dam: Gravity dam
- Impounds: Shannon River
- Height: 4.6 m (15 ft)

Reservoir
- Creates: Great Lake

Waddamana Power Station A; Waddamana Power Station B
- Operator: Tasmanian Hydro-Electric Department
- Commission date: A: 6 May 1916; B: 1949
- Decommission date: A: 30 June 1965; B: 1995
- Hydraulic head: 340 m (1,120 ft)
- Turbines: A: 2x 3.65 MW (4,890 hp) (1916–1922); A: 1x 6 MW (8,000 hp) (1919–1922) (all Boving Peloton-type); A: 6x 5.96 MW (7,990 hp) (1922–1965); B: 4x
- Installed capacity: A: 6.0 MW (8,000 hp); B: 48 MW (64,000 hp)

The Waddamana Hydroelectric power stations (originally known as the Great Lake Scheme) comprise two decommissioned conventional hydroelectric power stations and a gravity dam, subsequently submerged, located in the Central Highlands region of Tasmania, Australia.

The first station, commissioned in 1916, was the first hydro-electric power plant in Australia and was operated by the Tasmanian Hydro-Electric Department (later, Hydro Tasmania), until it was decommissioned in 1965. The second power station was commissioned in 1949 and decommissioned in 1995. The power stations were supplied by water from the Shannon River, via the Great Lake, that was impounded by the Miena Dam No. 1, later enlarged as the Miena Dam No. 2, and subsequently submerged below the current Miena Rockfill Dam. The latter dam was commissioned in 1966 to supply water for the Poatina Power Station.

On 6 May 1988, the first power station was officially opened as a technology museum, called the Waddamana Power Station Heritage Site. Waddamana is an Aboriginal word for "noisy water".

== Dam history ==
=== Miena Dam No. 1 ===
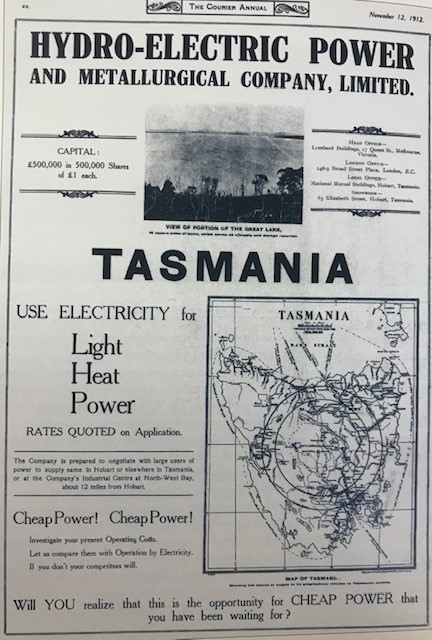
HEPMCo advertisement in the Weekly Courier annual supplement, 1912

The earliest suggestions of damming the Great Lake for hydroelectricity date from 1897, although, by 1904, the proposals became feasible. In 1909, it was identified that power was needed to smelt zinc ores from Broken Hill. By late 1909, James Hyndes Gillies had patented an electrolytic process for zinc refining, and it was mooted that a "carbide" smelter be constructed near Snug. A reliable supply of power was needed and a private company, the Tasmanian Hydro-Electric Power and Metallurgical Co. (HEPMCo.), was approved to develop the scheme. The Great Lake Scheme diverted the Shannon River into the nearby Ouse River – a drop of approximately 300 metres (980 ft) – for the generation of hydroelectricity. Water was provided by a small dam on the Great Lake at Miena, that diverted water down the steep drop using a woodstave pipeline and a flume.

Whilst construction commenced in 1910, capital to fund the project was limited. Weather conditions in the region were extremely harsh, restricting access to supplies and heavy equipment. Consequently, the Red Gate Tramway was constructed to assist. In 1912, the Ouse River and parts of the Great Lake froze over with ice. Work ceased in 1913 and company entered receivership. In 1914, the Tasmanian Government took over the works in progress and its structure became the forerunner to the Hydro-Electric Department, later the Hydro Electric Commission, and now, Hydro Tasmania. The first dam, 4.6 metres (15 ft) high, called the Miena Dam No. 1, was commissioned in 1916 to supply water for the generation of hydroelectricity at the Waddamana Power Station, later called Waddamana A.

=== Miena Dam No. 2 ===
As demand for power grew, the initial dam was expanded by a second dam, called the Miena Dam No. 2. This multiple arch buttress dam was completed in 1922. It was the first dam in Australia constructed of reinforced concrete. The dam wall was 12 metres (39 ft) high and 360 metres (1,180 ft) long. Water from the Great Lake was used to supply the Waddamana Power Station that had increased capacity to 49 megawatts (66,000 hp). The No. 2 dam wall was submerged following construction of the 1967 Miena Rockfill Dam.

== Hydroelectric power stations ==
=== Waddamana A ===
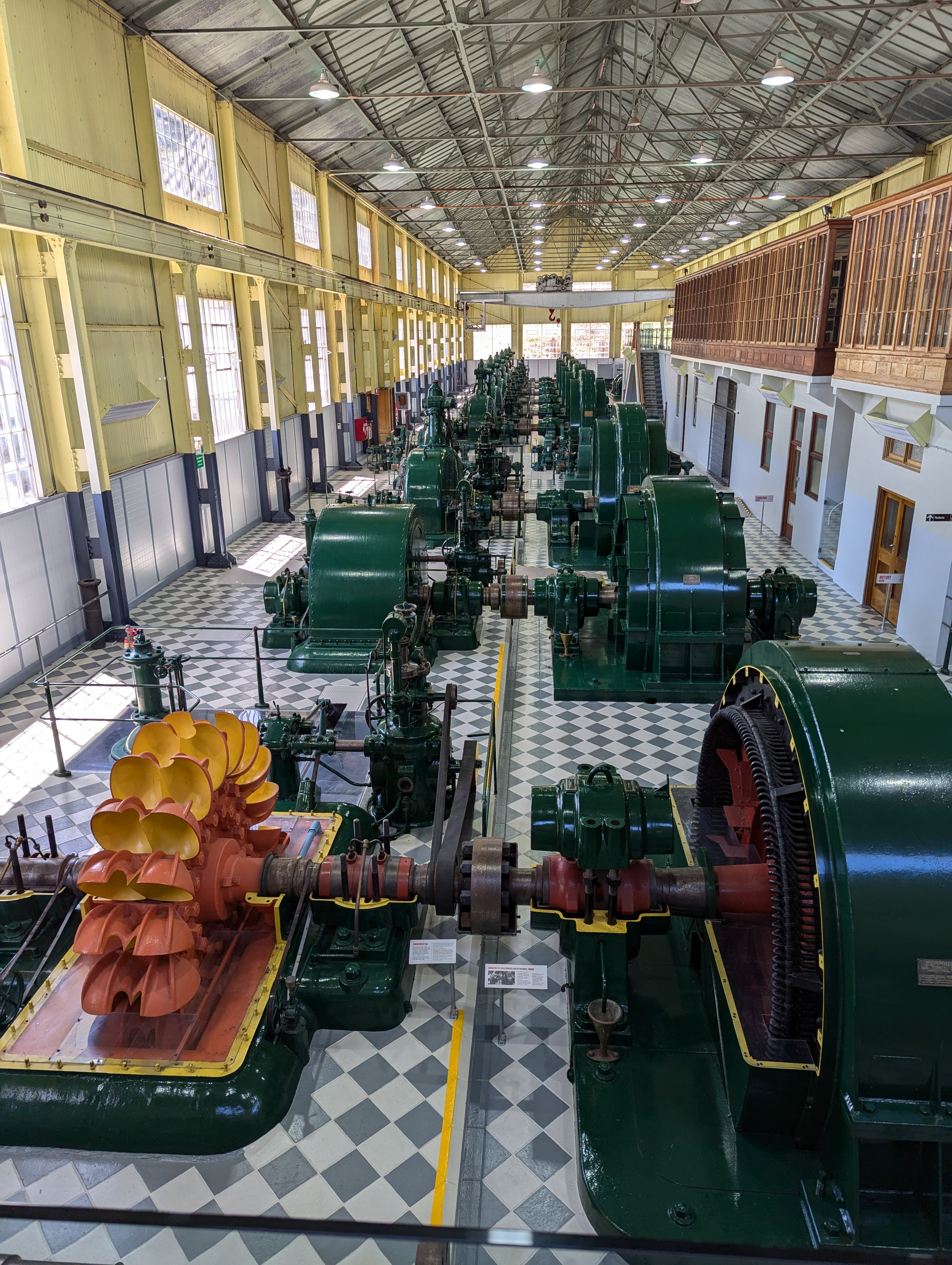
Turbine room of Waddamana A, now a technology museum

After HEPMCo. ran out of money they sold the incomplete works to the newly formed Hydro-Electric Department in 1914. The works were completed under the department's ownership in 1915, and the plant was officially opened by Governor-General Ronald Munro Ferguson on 6 May 1916, who turned on power to the city of Hobart the next day. It was the first plant ever operated by the department.

Waddamana Power Station Heritage Site
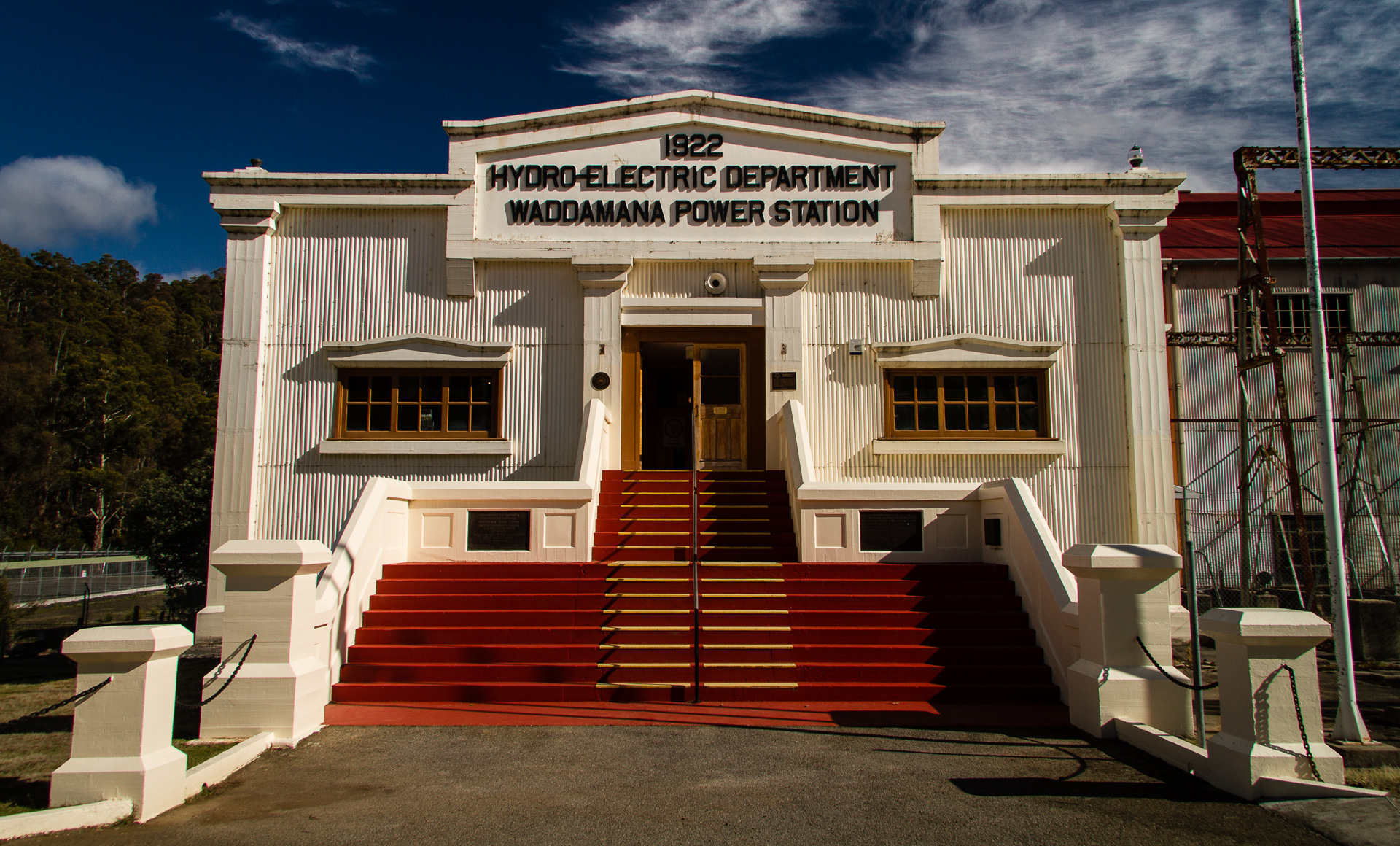
- The entrance to the museum
- Established: 6 May 1988
- Location: Main Road, Waddamana, Central Highlands, Tasmania
- Coordinates: 42°07′26″S 146°44′48″E
- Type: Technology museum
- Founder: Hydro Tasmania
- Owner: Hydro Tasmania
- Website: waddamanapowerstation.com.au

Tasmanian Heritage Register
- Official name: Great Lake Scheme
- Designated: 2014
- Reference no.: 11943

The plant operated at its original capacity of 7 megawatts (9,400 hp) from 1916 via two 3.7-megawatt (4,900 hp) turbines; a third 6-megawatt (8,000 hp) turbine was added in 1919. After 1922, six 6-megawatt (8,000 hp) turbines were installed to meet increased demand. Power was carried approximately 105 kilometres (65 mi) to Hobart, via an 88kV transmission line, supported by steel towers.

In February 1995, the Waddamana 'A' Power Station was listed as a National Engineering Landmark by Engineers Australia as part of its Engineering Heritage Recognition Program, and, in 2014, the original 1920s infrastructure is listed on the Tasmanian Heritage Register.

=== Waddamana B ===
In 1931, the Hydro-Electric Commission decided to construct a completely new plant to replace the original Waddamana Power Station, renamed as Waddamana A. However, war-time pressures meant that there was limited funding and, between 1939 and 1949, the HEC built the new power station adjacent to the existing plant. The two power plants operated side-by-side until 1965. The new plant was referred to as Waddamana B, and it generated 48 megawatts (64,000 hp) from four turbines.

=== Operation and shutdown ===
Both of the Waddamana plants operated through the 1940s and 1950s and, in the early 1960s, construction commenced of a new, larger power plant, the Poatina Power Station. Designed to replace the two Waddamana plants and the small Shannon plant nearby, the Poatina Power Station was opened in 1964 with a capacity of 325 megawatts (436,000 hp), over three times the combined capacity of the plants it replaced.

In order for the Poatina plant to be successful, it was necessary to stop the flow of water through Waddamana A and Shannon, both of which were decommissioned – Shannon in 1964, Waddamana A in 1965. The Shannon plant was demolished, but the two Waddamana plants remained standing. Waddamana B remained in active service until 1995 when it too was closed.

Waddamana A was repurposed as a technology museum in 1988 and it contains some of the plant's original equipment and other displays, including the control room switchboard from the Shannon Power Station.

== See also ==
- List of power stations in Tasmania
- List of reservoirs and dams in Australia § Tasmania
  - Miena Rockfill Dam
- List of lakes of Australia § Tasmania
