= USCGC Charles David Jr. =

Sentinel-class cutter

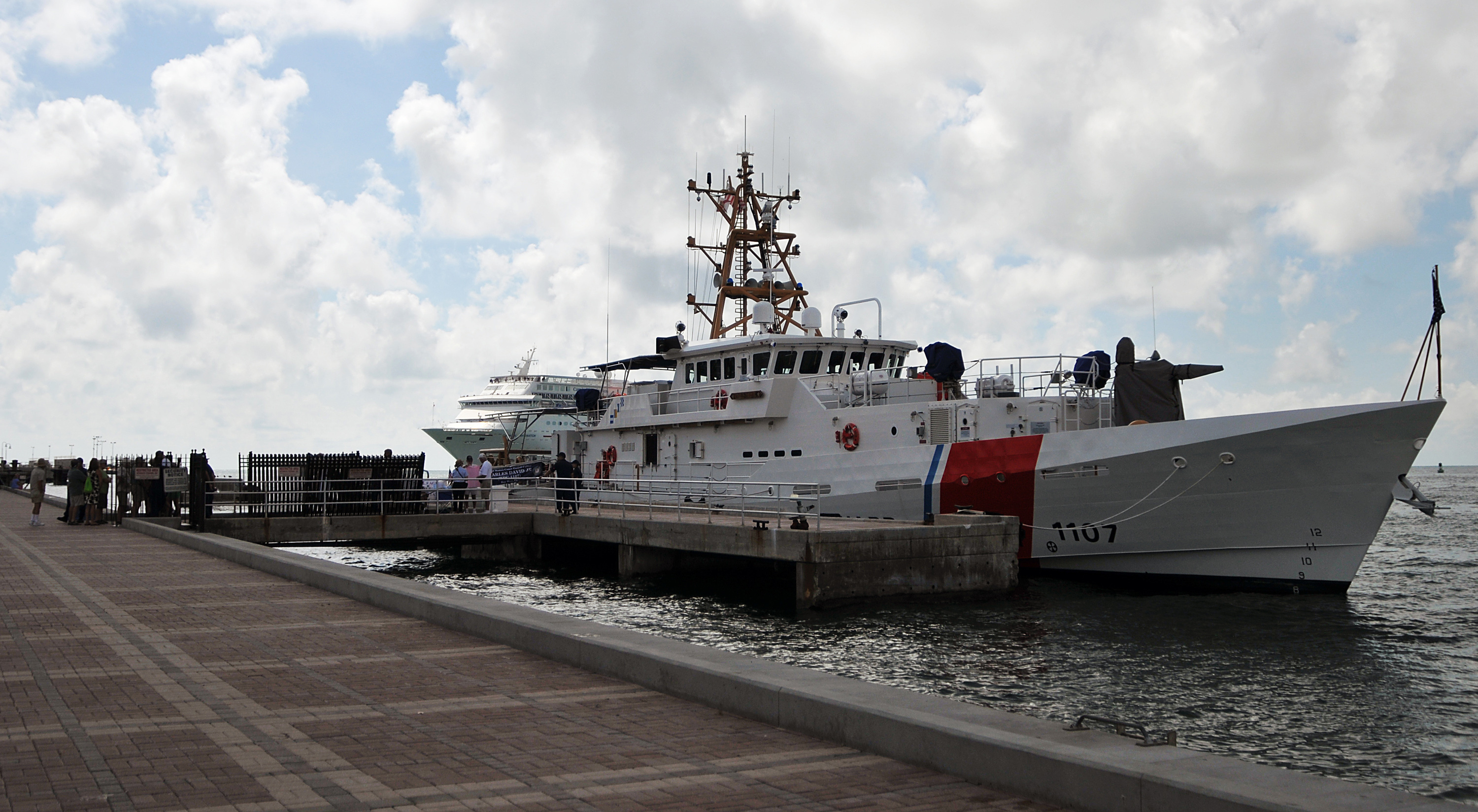
- Charles David Jr moors in Key West, shortly after commissioning.

History

United States
- Name: USCGC Charles David Jr
- Namesake: Charles Walter David Jr.
- Operator: United States Coast Guard
- Builder: Bollinger Shipyards, Lockport, Louisiana
- Launched: August 17, 2013
- Sponsored by: Sharon David
- Acquired: August 17, 2013
- Commissioned: November 16, 2013
- Home port: Key West, Florida
- Identification: MMSI number: 338926407; Callsign: NAKJ; Hull number: WPC-1107
- Motto: Steward of the Sea
- Status: in active service
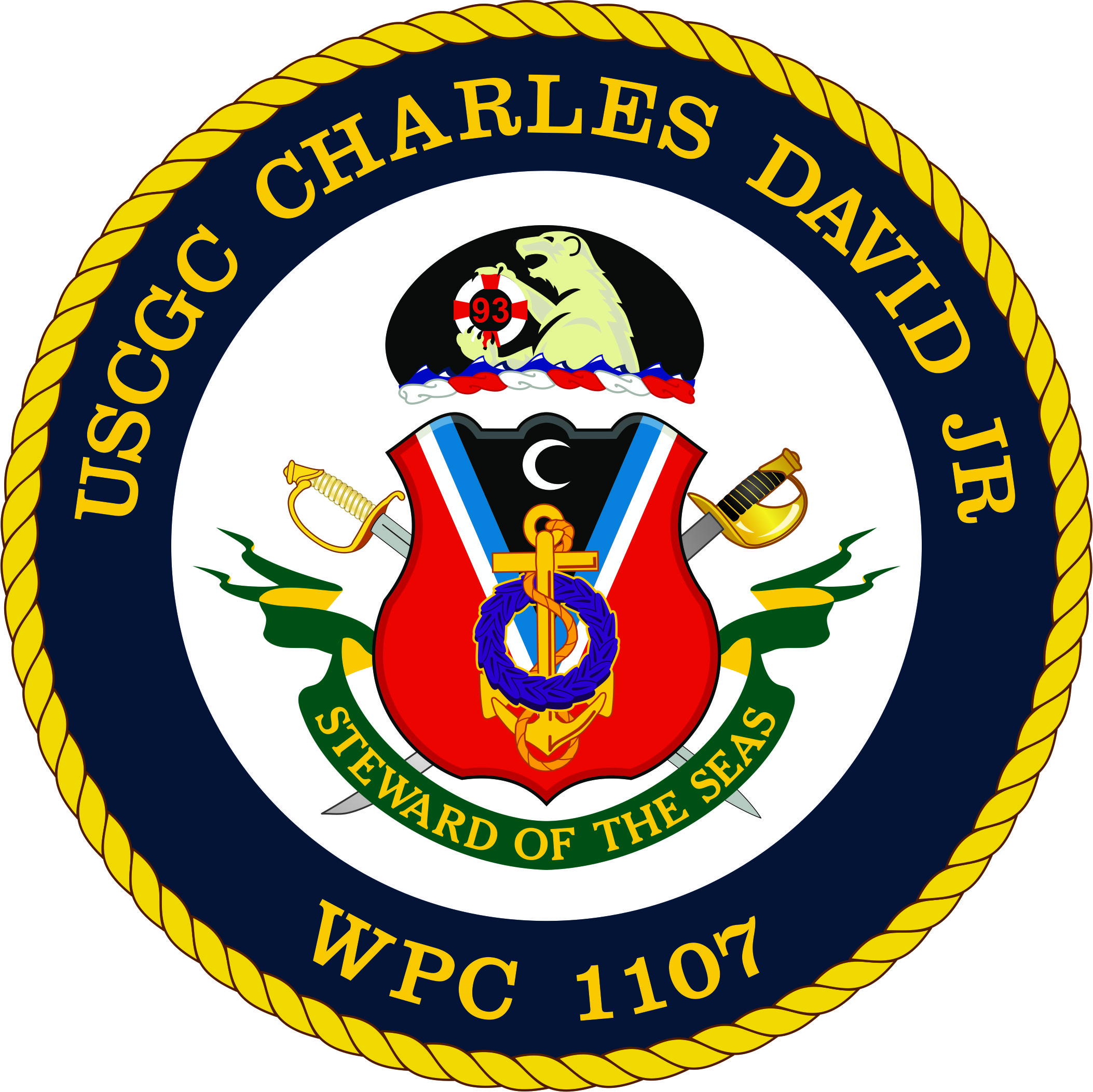
- Badge

General characteristics
- Class & type: Sentinel-class cutter
- Displacement: 353 long tons (359 t)
- Length: 46.8 m (154 ft)
- Beam: 8.11 m (26.6 ft)
- Depth: 2.9 m (9.5 ft)
- Propulsion: 2 × 4,300 kilowatts (5,800 shp); 1 × 75 kilowatts (101 shp) bow thruster
- Speed: 28 knots (52 km/h; 32 mph)
- Endurance: 5 days, 2,500 nautical miles (4,600 km; 2,900 mi); Designed to be on patrol 2,500 hours per year
- Boats & landing craft carried: 1 × Over the Horizon - Jet
- Complement: 1 officers, 20 crew
- Sensors & processing systems: L-3 C4ISR suite
- Armament: 1 × Mk 38 Mod 2 25 mm automatic gun; 4 × crew-served Browning M2 machine guns

USCGC Charles David Jr is the seventh Sentinel-class cutter. Upon her commissioning she was assigned to serve in Key West, Florida, as the first of six vessels to be based there. She was delivered to the Coast Guard, for testing, on August 17, 2013. She was officially commissioned on November 16, 2013.

== Namesake ==
The vessel is named after Charles Walter David Jr., who served as a Steward's Mate 1st Class in the United States Coast Guard. David was serving aboard USCGC Comanche escorting a convoy that included Dorchester. David was one of the Comanche crew members who volunteered to dive into the frigid waters to rescue exhausted crew and passengers from Dorchester. These crewmen used the newly devised "rescue retriever" technique whereby the rescuer dived overboard and tied a line around a hypothermic survivor who was then hoisted aboard the cutter.

David came down with pneumonia after the exertion of the rescue, dying a few days later. He was posthumously awarded the Navy and Marine Corps Medal.
