= Charles St John David =

- Born: 1855; Chepstow, Monmouthshire, Wales
- Died: 17 July 1924 (age 69); Wahroonga, New South Wales, Australia
- Occupation: civil engineer

Charles St John David (1855–1924) was a British born, Australian civil engineer. He arrived in Brisbane, Queensland in January 1880. He worked on railway construction, then was a partner in the Brisbane firm of Brown & David, civil engineers, architects and quantity surveyors.

In 1892 he became city surveyor in Launceston, Tasmania. In this role he was responsible for the civil works for the Duck Reach Power Station—the first publicly owned hydro-electric plant in the Southern Hemisphere.

He died while on holiday at Wahroonga, New South Wales on 17 July 1924. His body was returned to Launceston for a civic funeral.
