= Bradys Lake, Tasmania =

Bradys Lake
- Town
- Coordinates: 42°13′26″S 146°29′35″E
- Country: Australia
- State: Tasmania
- Region: Central
- LGA: Central Highlands
- Location: 68 km (42 mi) NW of Hamilton

Government
  - State electorate: Lyons
  - Federal division: Lyons

Population
  - Total: 53 (2016 census)
- Postcode: 7140
Localities around Bradys Lake
Bronte Park	Bronte Park, London Lakes, Dee	Dee
Bronte Park, Tarraleah	Bradys Lake	Tarraleah, Dee
Tarraleah	Tarraleah	Tarraleah

Bradys Lake is a rural locality in the local government area (LGA) of Central Highlands in the Central LGA region of Tasmania. The locality is about 68 kilometres (42 mi) north-west of the town of Hamilton. The 2016 census recorded a population of 53 for the state suburb of Bradys Lake.

== History ==
Bradys Lake is a confirmed locality.

Originally the settlement was called Bradys Gate, but in 1951 it was changed to Bradys Marsh, which later became Bradys Lake. As part of a hydro-electric dam system, the man made river flowing into Bradys Lake from the lake above is a popular slalom canoe and kayaking course. Hydro Tasmania can control the flow of water through the course by raising and lowering a sluice gate. The Australian 2022 Canoe Slalom National Championships was held at the site.

== Geography ==
The Nive River forms the western boundary. The waters of Lake Binney form part of the southern boundary and those of Bronte Lagoon part of the northern.

== Road infrastructure ==
Route A10 (Lyell Highway) runs through from north to south.
