= Wayatinah Dam =

Dam and power station in central highlands Tasmania

- Location of the dam in Tasmania
- Interactive map of Wayatinah Dam
- Country: Australia
- Location: Central Highlands Tasmania
- Coordinates: 42°24′00″S 146°29′38″E
- Purpose: Power
- Status: Operational
- Opening date: 1956
- Owner: Hydro Tasmania

Dam and spillways
- Type of dam: Rock-fill dam
- Impounds: River Derwent
- Height: 24 m (79 ft)
- Length: 549 m (1,801 ft)
- Dam volume: 125×10^{3} m^{3} (4.4×10^{6} cu ft)
- Spillways: 1
- Spillway type: Uncontrolled
- Spillway capacity: 3,115 m^{3}/s (110,000 cu ft/s)

Reservoir
- Creates: Wayatinah Lagoon
- Total capacity: 8,860 ML (7,180 acre⋅ft)
- Catchment area: 2,112 km^{2} (815 sq mi)
- Surface area: 24.1 ha (60 acres)
- Normal elevation: 232 m (761 ft) AHD

Wayatinah Power Station
- Coordinates: 42°25′12″S 146°31′48″E
- Operator: Hydro Tasmania
- Commission date: 1957
- Type: Run-of-the-river
- Hydraulic head: 56 m (184 ft)
- Turbines: 3 x 15.3 MW (20,500 hp); English Electric Francis-type
- Installed capacity: 38.3 MW (51,400 hp)
- Capacity factor: 0.85
- Annual generation: 440 GWh (1,600 TJ)
- Website hydro.com.au

The Wayatinah Dam is a rock-filled embankment dam with earthen core across the Lower River Derwent, located near the small settlement of Wayatinah, in the Central Highlands region of Tasmania, Australia. Completed in 1983, the resultant reservoir, Wayatinah Lagoon, was established for the purpose of generation of hydroelectricity via the adjacent Wayatinah Power Station, a run-of-the-river hydroelectric power station.

The dam, its reservoir, and the power station are owned and operated by Hydro Tasmania. The etymology of the word wayatinah is derived from a Tasmanian Aboriginal word meaning "brook" or "stream".

== Dam and reservoir overview ==
The rockfill dam wall is 24 metres (79 ft) high and 549 metres (1,801 ft) long. When full, the Wayatinah Lagoon has capacity of 8,860 megalitres (7,180 acre⋅ft) and covers 24.1 hectares (60 acres), drawn from a catchment area of 2,112 square kilometres (815 sq mi). The uncontrolled spillway has a flow capacity of 3,115 cubic metres per second (110,000 cu ft/s).

== Hydroelectric power station ==
Part of the Derwent scheme that comprises eleven hydroelectric power stations, the Wayatinah Power Station is the sixth power station in the scheme and the second power station in the lower run-of-river system. The aboveground power station is located on the Derwent, below its junction with the Nive River. Water from the Derwent from Liapootah Power Station and spill from Liapootah Dam flows into Wayatinah Lagoon. Water in the lagoon is diverted by a 2-kilometre (1.2 mi)-long tunnel to two low pressure woodstave pipelines, each 1.3 kilometres (0.81 mi) long. It then descends 56 metres (184 ft) through three steel penstocks to the Wayatinah Power Station. The tunnel intake structure is provided with two vertical lift, gravity close intake gates designed to cut off full flow. Each of the three steel penstocks is provided with a hilltop valve designed to close under full flow.

The power station was commissioned in 1957 by the Hydro Electric Corporation (TAS) and the station has three 15.3-megawatt (20,500 hp) English Electric Francis turbines, with a combined generating capacity of 38.3 megawatts (51,400 hp) of electricity. Within the station building, each turbine has a fully embedded spiral casing and water flow is controlled by a spherical rotary main inlet valve and a turbine relief valve designed to prevent spiral casing overpressure. The station output, estimated to be 440 gigawatt-hours (1,600 TJ) annually, is fed to TasNetworks' transmission grid via an 11 kV/220 kV three-phase English Electric generator transformer to the outdoor switchyard. An 11 kV indoor switchgear system also supplies a distribution yard that supplies power to the local area from Wayatinah village to Hamilton and includes the power stations of Liapootah, Wayatinah, Catagunya, Repulse and Cluny.

== See also ==
- List of power stations in Tasmania
- List of reservoirs and dams in Tasmania
- List of run-of-the-river hydroelectric power stations
