= Butlers Gorge, Tasmania =

Butlers Gorge Tasmania
- Coordinates: 42°14′57″S 146°15′34″E
- Population: nil (2016 census)
- Postcode(s): 7140
- Elevation: 667 m (2,188 ft)
- Location: 67 km (42 mi) NW of Hamilton
- LGA(s): Central Highlands
- Region: Central
- State electorate(s): Lyons
- Federal division(s): Lyons
| Mean max temp | Mean min temp | Annual rainfall |
| 12.9 °C; 55 °F | 3.0 °C; 37 °F | 1,677.6 mm 66 in |
Localities around Butlers Gorge:
| Southwest | Derwent Bridge | Bronte Park |
| Southwest | Butlers Gorge | Tarraleah, Bronte Park |
| Southwest | Southwest | Southwest |

Butlers Gorge is a rural locality in the local government area of Central Highlands in the Central region of Tasmania. It is located about 67 kilometres (42 mi) north-west of the town of Hamilton. The 2016 census determined a population of nil for the state suburb of Butlers Gorge.

== History ==
Butlers Gorge was gazetted as a locality in 1971. It was named for John Leslie Butler, a surveyor who worked in the area.

== Geography ==
Most of Lake King William is contained within the locality. The River Derwent flows from the lake to the south-east boundary.

=== Climate ===
Butlers Gorge has a cold Oceanic climate (Köppen: Cfb), bordering on a Subpolar oceanic climate (Köppen: Cfc), with cool to cold weather year-round. Over the period 1957 to 1993, there were on average 27.1 snowy days annually, which can occur in any month of the year. It is very cloudy, particularly in the cooler months, with an average of 75 and 78 sun hours in June and July. There are 19.4 clear days annually and 163.4 cloudy days.

Despite the relatively low elevation of 667 metres (2,188 ft), some of the coldest temperatures in Australia are often recorded at Butlers Gorge, due to being further south and more exposed to cold westerly airmasses than Liawenee to the north-east.

Climate data for Butlers Gorge (1941–2023); 667 m AMSL; 42.28° S, 146.28° E
| Month | Jan | Feb | Mar | Apr | May | Jun | Jul | Aug | Sep | Oct | Nov | Dec | Year |
|---|---|---|---|---|---|---|---|---|---|---|---|---|---|
| Record high °C (°F) | 34.4 (93.9) | 33.5 (92.3) | 31.9 (89.4) | 25.0 (77.0) | 22.0 (71.6) | 18.3 (64.9) | 16.1 (61.0) | 18.9 (66.0) | 24.4 (75.9) | 26.8 (80.2) | 30.3 (86.5) | 32.9 (91.2) | 34.4 (93.9) |
| Mean daily maximum °C (°F) | 19.0 (66.2) | 18.8 (65.8) | 16.6 (61.9) | 13.1 (55.6) | 10.0 (50.0) | 7.8 (46.0) | 7.1 (44.8) | 8.0 (46.4) | 10.2 (50.4) | 12.6 (54.7) | 14.8 (58.6) | 16.8 (62.2) | 12.9 (55.2) |
| Mean daily minimum °C (°F) | 6.5 (43.7) | 6.2 (43.2) | 5.2 (41.4) | 3.4 (38.1) | 1.8 (35.2) | 0.3 (32.5) | −0.3 (31.5) | 0.1 (32.2) | 1.1 (34.0) | 2.4 (36.3) | 4.0 (39.2) | 5.5 (41.9) | 3.0 (37.4) |
| Record low °C (°F) | −2.8 (27.0) | −2.5 (27.5) | −4.4 (24.1) | −5.7 (21.7) | −6.7 (19.9) | −13.0 (8.6) | −12.5 (9.5) | −12.2 (10.0) | −6.5 (20.3) | −5.7 (21.7) | −5.5 (22.1) | −3.3 (26.1) | −13.0 (8.6) |
| Average precipitation mm (inches) | 92.1 (3.63) | 80.0 (3.15) | 101.2 (3.98) | 139.0 (5.47) | 162.6 (6.40) | 151.1 (5.95) | 177.7 (7.00) | 185.1 (7.29) | 168.5 (6.63) | 159.0 (6.26) | 135.3 (5.33) | 124.0 (4.88) | 1,677.6 (66.05) |
| Average precipitation days (≥ 0.2 mm) | 15.0 | 12.9 | 16.4 | 19.4 | 21.7 | 21.0 | 23.5 | 23.9 | 21.8 | 21.3 | 19.3 | 18.2 | 234.4 |
| Average afternoon relative humidity (%) | 56 | 62 | 64 | 69 | 77 | 80 | 80 | 75 | 67 | 66 | 63 | 59 | 68 |
| Mean monthly sunshine hours | 244.9 | 220.4 | 176.7 | 126.0 | 86.8 | 75.0 | 77.5 | 99.2 | 117.0 | 176.7 | 189.0 | 201.5 | 1,790.7 |
Source 1: Butlers Gorge (general data, 1941–2023)
Source 2: Lake St Clair (HEC, sunshine 1964–1989)

== Road infrastructure ==
The C603 route (Butlers Gorge Road) enters from the south-east and terminates at the Lake King William Dam.

== See also ==
- Butlers Gorge Power Station
