= Sandy Bay, Tasmania =

Sandy Bay
- Suburb
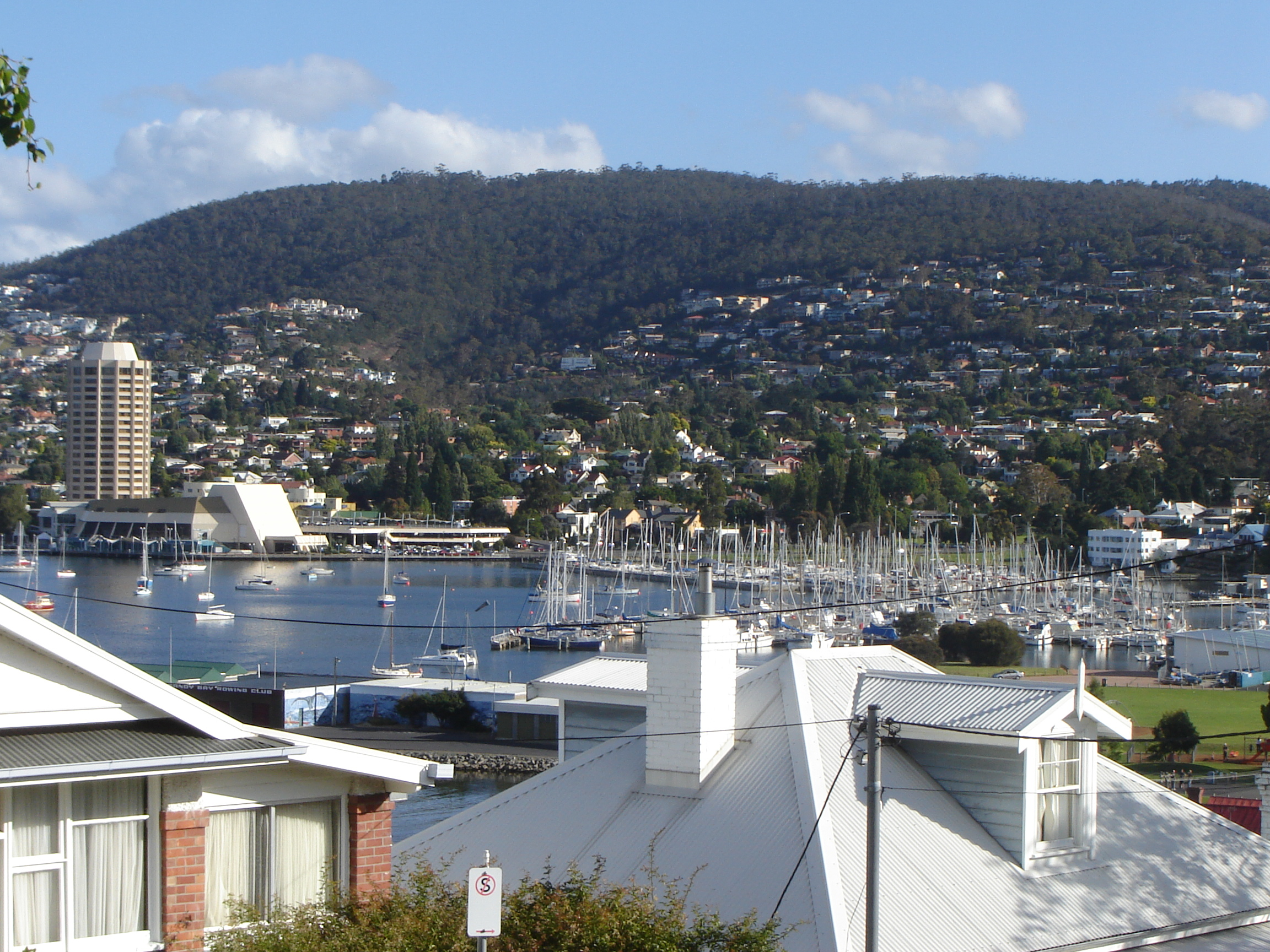
- View of Wrest Point Casino and Sandy Bay

- Interactive map of Sandy Bay
- Coordinates: 42°54′04″S 147°19′37″E
- Country: Australia
- State: Tasmania
- City: Hobart
- LGA: City of Hobart

Government
  - State electorate: Clark
  - Federal division: Clark

Population
  - Total: 12,315 (2021 census)
- Postcode: 7005
Suburbs around Sandy Bay
| Dynnyrne | Battery Point | River Derwent |
| Tolmans Hill | Sandy Bay | River Derwent |
| Mount Nelson | Taroona | River Derwent |

Sandy Bay is a suburb of the city of Hobart, Tasmania, Australia, located immediately south of the Hobart central business district, and adjoining the suburb of Battery Point. Sandy Bay is bounded on the east by the River Derwent, and has several beaches along the shore, the main beaches with public access are Short Beach, Nutgrove Beach, Long Beach and Lords Beach.

The suburb has many large homes, and is known as one of the city's prestigious areas. In the more southern areas of Sandy Bay, close to the water and also high on the slopes of Mt Nelson, are some of Tasmania's most expensive real estate. It is also the site of the Hobart campus of the University of Tasmania, and the private schools, Fahan School, The Hutchins School, and Mount Carmel College, Sandy Bay. There is considerable diversity within the suburb. The area surrounding the University of Tasmania is home to considerable student accommodation.

Sandy Bay is accessible from the city via Sandy Bay Road, which runs from Davey Street in the city all the way to the Kingborough municipal boundary at Taroona where it becomes the Channel Highway. Before the construction of the Southern Outlet, the road was the primary route to and from Kingston. The higher parts of Sandy Bay are accessible via Regent Street, which bypasses the main shopping district and goes through the University of Tasmania to Churchill Avenue and Lower Sandy Bay.

Australia's first legal casino, Wrest Point Hotel Casino, was opened in 1973 at the site of the former Wrest Point Riviera hotel.

== History ==
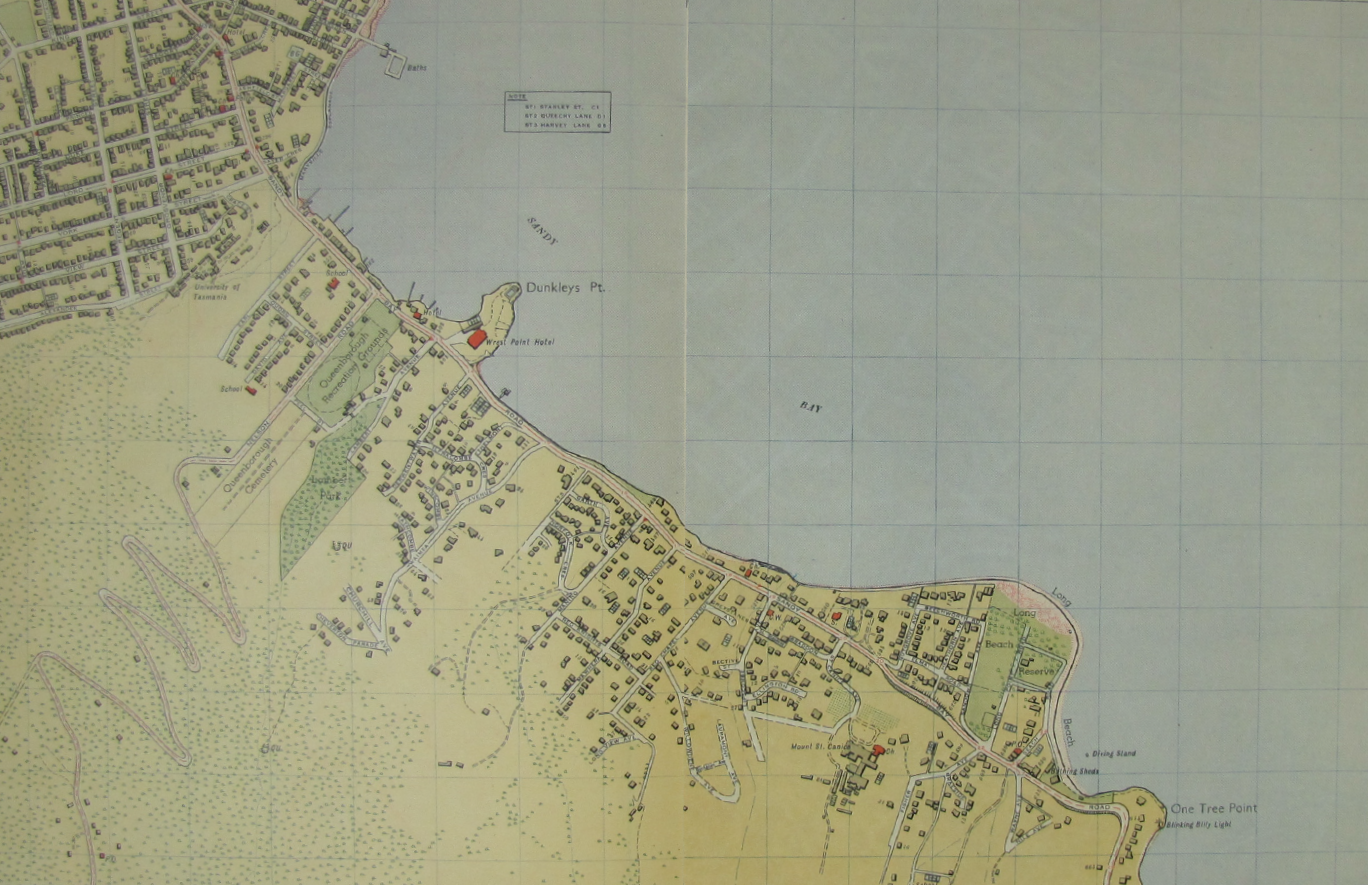
Map of Sandy Bay in 1954

Most of the land at Sandy Bay was granted to Norfolk Islanders when the colonial authorities forced them to relocate to Van Diemen's Land in 1808.

The suburb's long sandy beach was one of the first venues for horseracing in Tasmania's early days. The tides had to be considered when scheduling the races to ensure there was sufficient space available. The races attracted large crowds and there was a lot of rash betting, loud shouting and uninhibited consumption of refreshments.

The Queenborough Road Trust was initiated in 1861. The Trust was created under the Cross and Bye Roads Act 1852 (15 Vict No.8.), proposed on 24 Nov 1860, and held its first meeting on 22 Jan 1861. Its purpose was to construct, maintain and regulate cross and bye roads in the Queenborough Road District.

The Browns River Road District was proclaimed on 8 Nov 1852, under the Cross and Bye Roads Act 1852 (15 Vict No.8.) and abolished on 4 Sep 1871.

The Browns River and Sandy Bay Rivulet Road District was proclaimed on 4 Sep 1871, under the Cross and Bye Roads Act 1870 (33 Vict No.8.) and abolished on 26 Sep 1881.

The Browns River Road District was proclaimed on 26 Sep 1881, under the Cross and Bye Roads Act 1870 (33 Vict No.8.) and was abolished on 16 Nov 1885.

The Sandy Bay Road District was proclaimed on 16 Nov 1885, under the Roads Act 1870 (48 Vict No.28.).

The Browns River Road District proclaimed on 23 Jul 1897, and the name changed to Kingston on 26 Nov 1897.

Queenborough became a town under the Towns Act 1891 (55 Vict No.41.), and was proclaimed on 16 May 1892 (HTG 17 May 1892 p. 1038). It ultimately became part of the City of Hobart in 1914.

Sandy Bay Post Office opened on 22 April 1852. It was named Queenborough between 1859 and 1878. In the south of the suburb the Lower Sandy Bay office opened in 1885. It was renamed Sandy Bay Lower in 1895, Beachside in 1921 and Sandy Bay Lower in 1968.

== Demographics ==
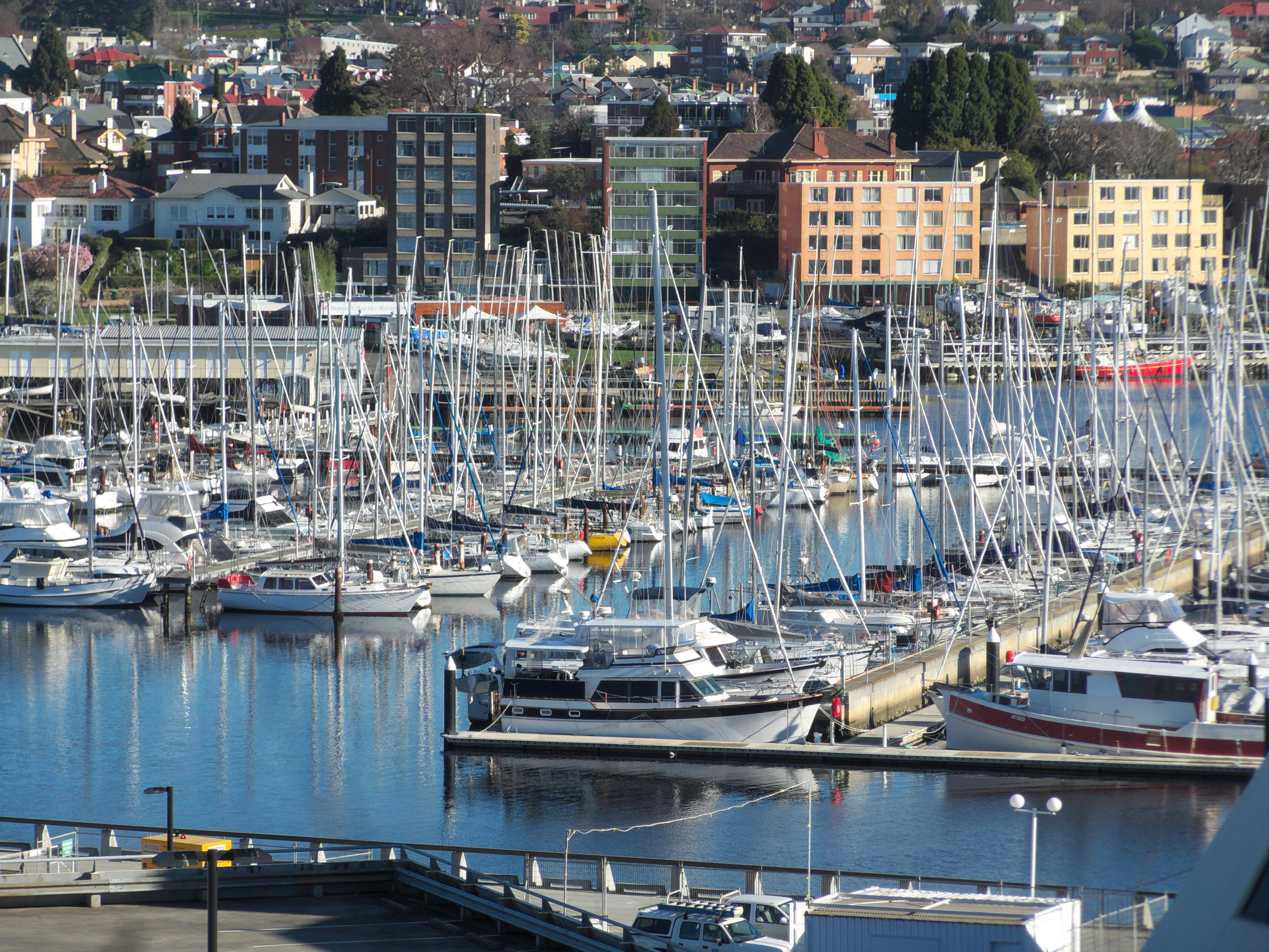
Marina at Sandy Bay

At the 2016 census, Sandy Bay had a population of 11,927 people.

Sandy Bay residents had a median age of 40. Median individual incomes in Sandy Bay were above average for the region—$511 per week compared with $455 per week; and 23.74% had incomes above $1,000 per week, compared with 15.50% across the Greater Hobart region. Industry sectors in which Sandy Bay residents worked were comparable with those in Hobart generally, with the largest proportions working in health care (17.67%), education (15.77%), retail (13.84%), hospitality (11.91%), public administration (9.66%) and professional, scientific and technical services (7.19%).

There is considerable diversity within the suburb. One of Sandy Bay's census collection districts (CCDs), based around the University of Tasmania and representing 1,131 people or 10% of the population, has a median age of 23 and an average income of $218, with almost three-quarters of the population in some form of education. Over 20% of the district's population is from Malaysia or China, compared to 5.7% in the suburb generally. At the other end of the scale, 59% of the suburb's population live in CCDs with median incomes above $500, some significantly above this, especially in the Lower Sandy Bay district.

The most common religious affiliations in descending order in the 2006 census were Anglican, no religion, Roman Catholic, Uniting and Buddhism. Parishes for the Anglican and Catholic churches have existed in the suburb since 1922 and 1934 respectively.

== Politics ==
Sandy Bay is the only suburb of Hobart which is consistently safe for the centre-right Liberal Party at both state and federal level. The suburb is served by four booths – Sandy Bay, Sandy Bay Beach, Lower Sandy Bay and Waimea Heights – while another booth, Dynnyrne, is shared with the neighbouring suburbs of South Hobart and Dynnyrne respectively.

At federal level the electoral Division of Denison which encompasses the Sandy Bay region which had been a consistently marginal seat, but was held by the Australian Labor Party between 1987 and 2010 with little difficulty. The current member is the incumbent independent MP Andrew Wilkie, elected at the 2010 election.

At state level in the Division of Clark which encompasses the Sandy Bay area the current sitting members are:

- Scott Bacon – Labor
- Elise Archer – Liberal
- Matthew Groom – Liberal
- Cassy O'Connor – Greens
- Madeleine Ogilvie – Labor

In the Tasmanian Legislative Council, Sandy Bay is within the electoral division of Nelson, and has been represented by independent member Jim Wilkinson since 1995.

2010 federal election Source: AEC
| Liberal | 38.6% |
| Independent | 24.7% |
| Labor | 19.6% |
| Greens | 16.5% |
| Socialist | 0.26% |

2010 state election Source: TEC
| Liberal | 46.9% |
| Greens | 24.6% |
| Labor | 16.6% |
| Independent | 12.7% |

2007 federal election Source: AEC
| Liberal | 48.8% |
| Labor | 30.6% |
| Greens | 18.4% |
| Family First | 1.38% |
| CEC | 0.26% |

2006 state election Source: TEC
| Liberal | 47.3% |
| Labor | 26.0% |
| Greens | 24.6% |
| Independent | 1.12% |

2004 federal election Source: AEC
| Liberal | 51.9% |
| Labor | 30.9% |
| Greens | 15.0% |
| Family First | 1.59% |
| Socialist Alliance | 0.64% |

2002 state election Source: TEC
| Liberal | 37.2% |
| Labor | 33.8% |
| Greens | 27.4% |
| Independent | 1.08% |

2001 federal election Source: AEC
| Liberal | 52.2% |
| Labor | 30.2% |
| Greens | 10.6% |
| Democrats | 6.87% |

1998 state election Source: TEC
| Liberal | 60.7% |
| Labor | 22.0% |
| Greens | 14.8% |
| Democrats | 0.85% |

== Notable people ==
- Chris Stone (footballer) was born in Sandy Bay
- Mary Donaldson (Queen of Denmark) lived in Sandy bay
