= Lords Beach =

Suburban beach in Sandy Bay, Tasmania

- Beach
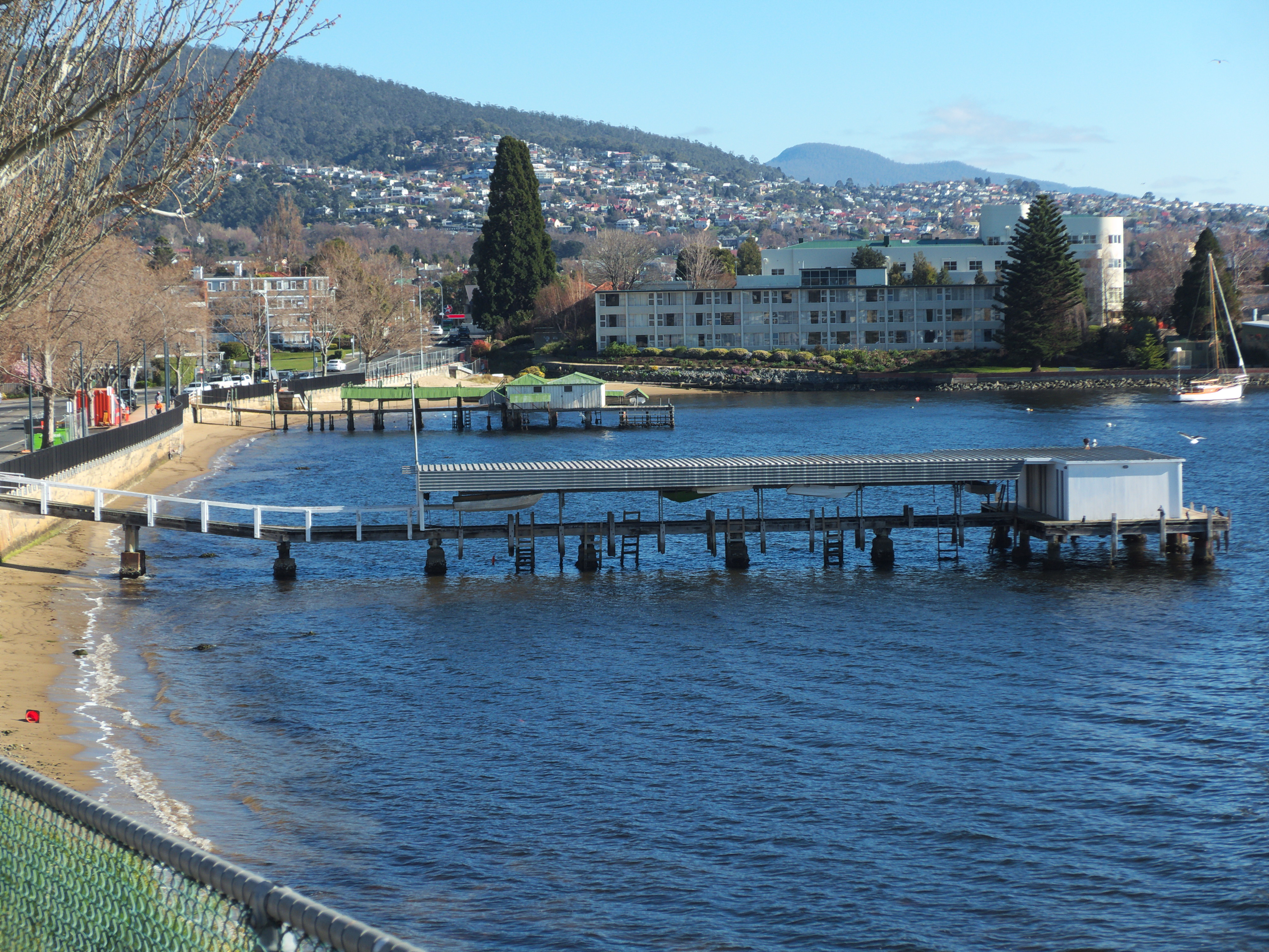
- Lords Beach with two covered piers. The pier in the foreground is known as Waimea Jetty, built in the 1960s.

- Location within Hobart
- Coordinates: 42°54′17.07″S 147°20′18.06″E
- Location: Sandy Bay, Hobart, Tasmania, Australia
- Water bodies: River Derwent

Dimensions
  - Length: 700 metres (2,300 ft)
- Patrolled by: Surf Life Saving Tasmania
- Hazard rating: 2/10 (Least hazardous)
- Access: Footpath, Sandy Bay Road

Lords Beach is a suburban beach along the River Derwent in Sandy Bay, Hobart, Tasmania. The beach faces north-east and offers views of Wrest Point Hotel Casino, Nutgrove Beach, and the City of Clarence on the eastern shore. Lords Beach features several covered piers, including the Waimea Jetty, built in the 1960s. It is situated between Red Chapel Beach to the west and Dunkley's Point to the east.

== History ==
Lords Beach is named after James Lord, a convict landowner, who also lent his name to Lord Street. In the past, Lords Beach was part of a continuous stretch of beach that included Red Chapel Beach, Nutgrove Beach, and Long Beach. Development and natural erosion have caused these beaches to become separated.

Several covered jetties are located along the beach, used to store boats moored in waters reaching depths of up to 50 metres (160 ft).

In 2023, a developer proposed constructing floating tourist accommodation on the River Derwent, potentially affecting the area surrounding Lords Beach.

== Marine life ==
Occasionally, Lords Beach experiences bioluminescence, a phenomenon caused by microscopic plankton, which can illuminate the waters in the evening.

== Environment ==
Lords Beach has been altered by the construction of seawalls, which were built to mitigate erosion and protect the area from strong currents and waves from the River Derwent. Human activity, such as foot traffic and road construction along Sandy Bay Road, has also contributed to the changing landscape.

The beach is now a 700-metre (2,300 ft) stretch of sand bordered by the Wrest Point seawall and a seawall along Sandy Bay Road. The beach features waves typically ranging between 1–1.5 metres (3 ft 3 in – 4 ft 11 in) in height, creating a steep beach profile.

== Access ==
Lords Beach is accessible via a 45-minute walk from the Hobart City Centre, or by using the Metro Tasmania bus service along Sandy Bay Road.

== Real estate ==
In 2024, the Waimea Jetty at Lords Beach was listed for sale for the first time, offering an opportunity to acquire waterfront infrastructure.

== Gallery ==
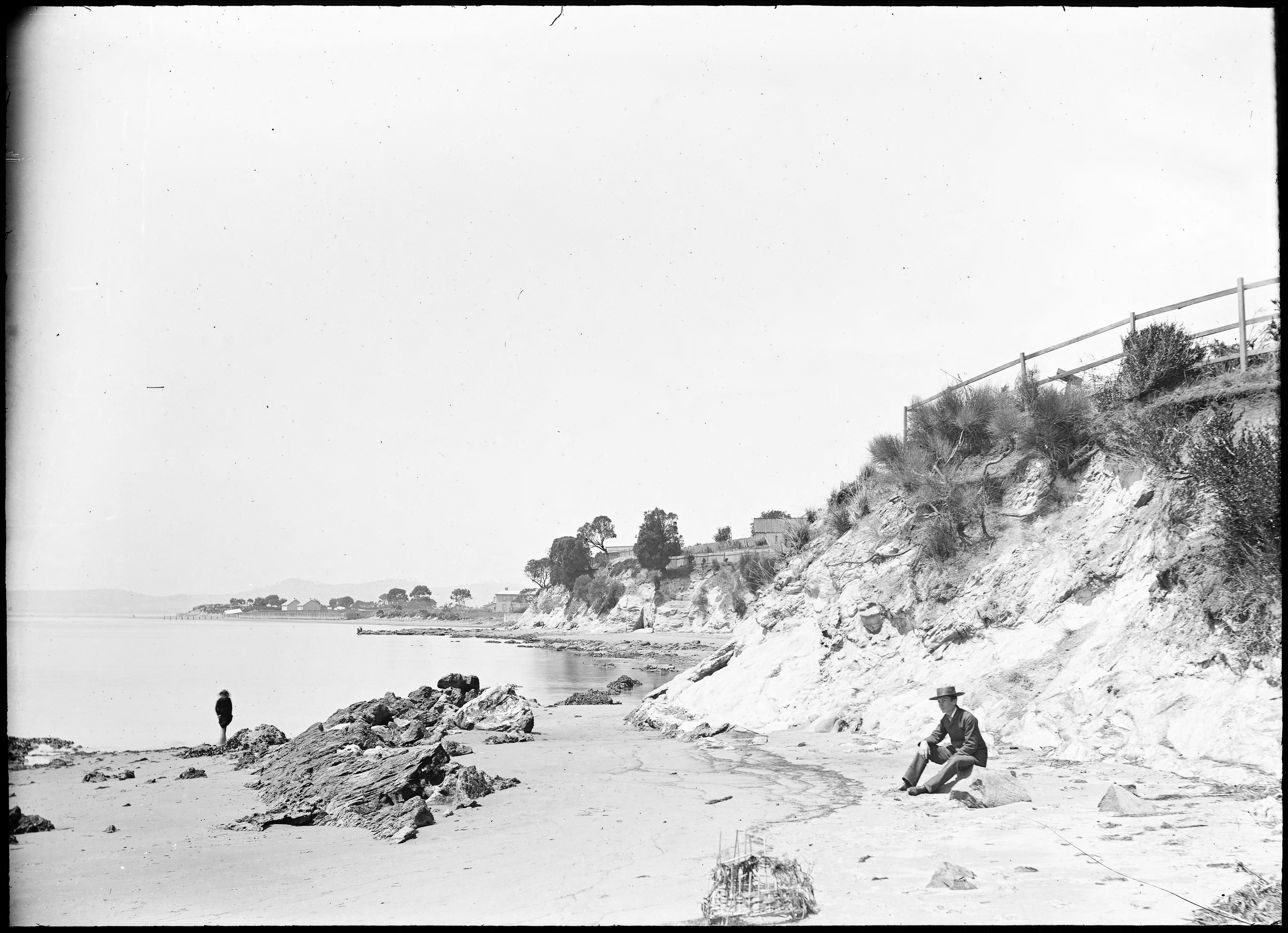
Lords Beach in 1930, depicting its natural eroding foreshore

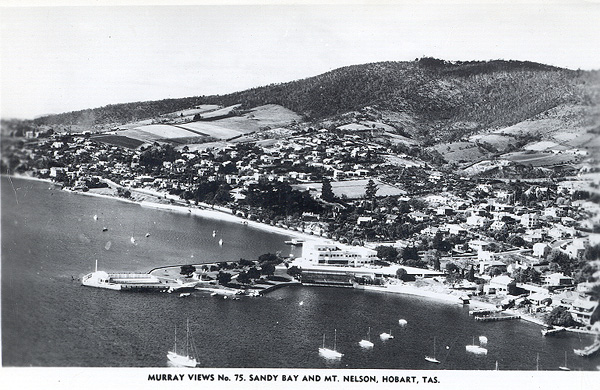
Aerial of Lords Beach and the Riviera Hotel in the 1930s

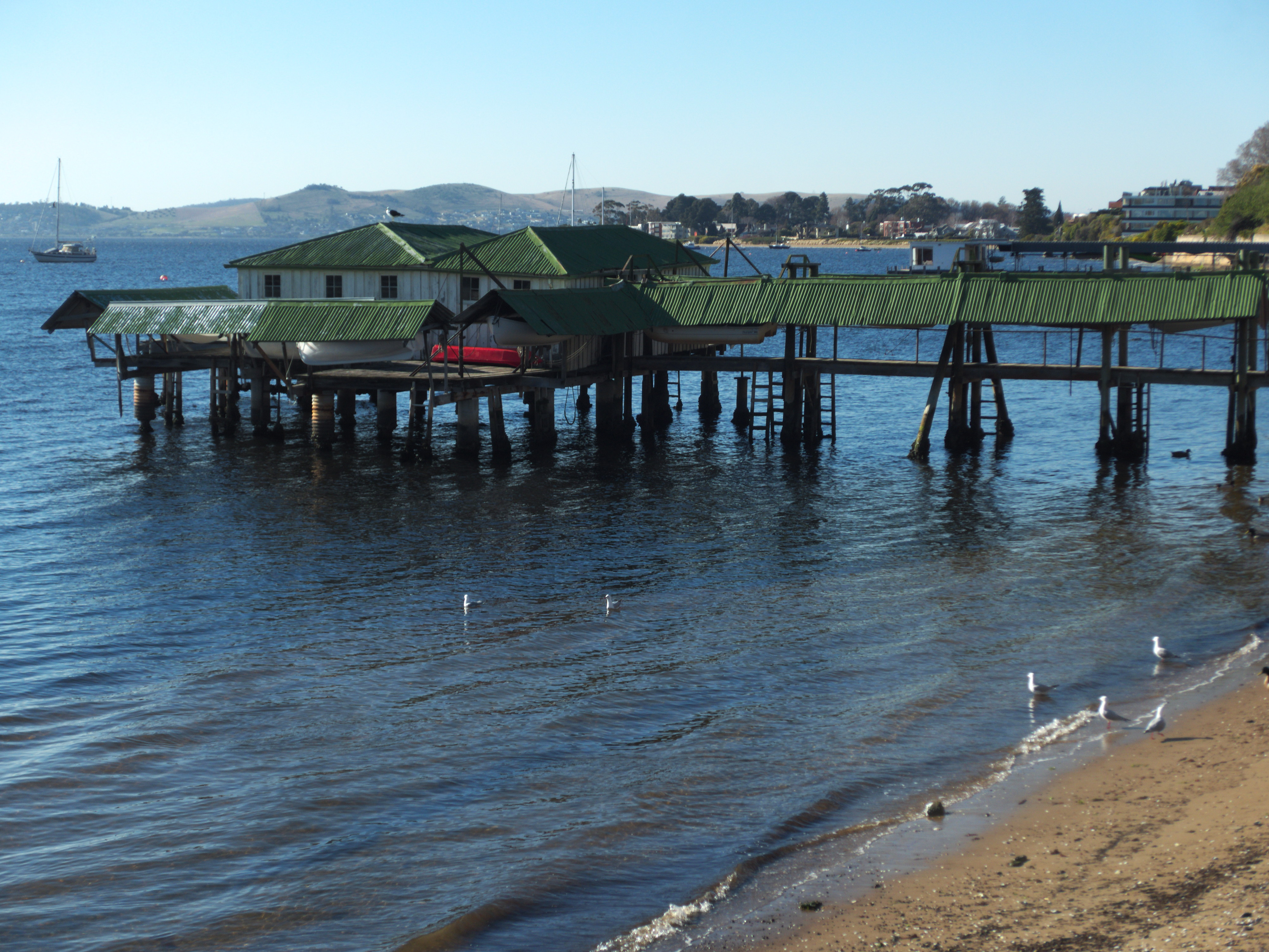
A covered pier at Lords Beach
