= Derwent Bridge =

- Town
- Coordinates: 42°08′S 146°13′E
- Country: Australia
- State: Tasmania
- Region: Central
- LGA: Central Highlands
- Location: 101 km (63 mi) NW of Hamilton

Government
  - State electorate: Lyons
  - Federal division: Lyons

Population
  - Total: 40 (2021 census)
- Postcode: 7140
Localities around Derwent Bridge
Lake St Clair	Walls of Jerusalem	Central Plateau
Southwest	Derwent Bridge	Bronte Park
Southwest	Butlers Gorge	Bronte Park

Derwent Bridge is a rural locality in the local government area (LGA) of Central Highlands in the Central LGA region of Tasmania. The locality is about 101 kilometres (63 mi) north-west of the town of Hamilton. The 2021 Census it listed with a population of 40 for the state suburb of Derwent Bridge. It is on the Lyell Highway at the southern edge of the Cradle Mountain-Lake St Clair National Park.

It is just south of Lake St Clair and the Lake St Clair visitor centre; and it is north of Lake King William and the Butlers Gorge Power Station.

It is also the last inhabited location before Linda Valley in the West Coast Range - this section of the highway passes through the Wild Rivers National Park. In the past there were a couple of isolated houses along Lyell Highway that have been removed.

Today, Derwent Bridge features not only the bridge alluded to in its name – spanning the River Derwent – but accommodation units, and also a roadside public house.

Derwent Bridge was used as a principal filming location for the 2008 film The Last Confession of Alexander Pearce.

== History ==
Derwent Bridge was gazetted as a locality in 1959.

Derwent Bridge Post Office opened on 15 February 1937 and closed in 1980.

== Demographics ==
According to the 2021 Census, Derwent Bridge had a population of 40 people. Males constituted 40.9% and females 59.1% and the median age was 33. The average number of people per household was 1.4 and the median household income $1,292.

== Geography ==
The River Derwent flows through from north to south. The northern end of Lake King William protrudes into the locality.

== Road infrastructure ==
Route A10 (Lyell Highway) passes through from east to south-west. Route C193 (Lake St Clair Road) starts at an intersection with A10 and runs north-west until it exits.
