= Wayatinah, Tasmania =

Wayatinah
- Town
- Coordinates: 42°23′28″S 146°30′04″E
- Country: Australia
- State: Tasmania
- Region: Central
- LGA: Central Highlands
- Location: 40 km (25 mi) NW of Hamilton

Government
  - State electorate: Lyons
  - Federal division: Lyons

Population
  - Total: 18 (SAL 2021)
- Postcode: 7140
Localities around Wayatinah
Tarraleah	Ouse	Ouse
Tarraleah	Wayatinah	Ouse
Southwest	Southwest	Ouse

Wayatinah is a rural locality in the local government area of Central Highlands in the Central region of Tasmania. It is located about 40 kilometres (25 mi) north-west of the town of Hamilton.

== History ==
Wayatinah was gazetted as a locality in 1971. The name is an Aboriginal word meaning “brook”.

The 2016 census determined a population of 34 for the state suburb of Wayatinah. At the 2021 census, the population had decreased to 18.

== Geography ==
The River Derwent enters from the west, flows through Wayatinah Lagoon and then south, where it forms most of the southern boundary.

== Road infrastructure ==
The Lyell Highway (A10) enters from the east and runs through to the north-west, where it exits. Route C604 (Long Spur Road) starts at an intersection with A10 and runs south through Wayatinah Forest Reserve to the River Derwent, where it ends.

== See also ==
- Wayatinah Power Station
