= Hermitage, Tasmania =

Hermitage Tasmania
- Coordinates: 42°15′35″S 146°51′03″E
- Population: nil (2016 census)
- Postcode(s): 7030
- Location: 55 km (34 mi) N of Hamilton
- LGA(s): Central Highlands
- Region: Central
- State electorate(s): Lyons
- Federal division(s): Lyons
Localities around Hermitage:
Waddamana	Waddamana	Bothwell
Osterley	Hermitage	Bothwell
Osterley	Bothwell	Bothwell

Hermitage is a rural locality in the local government area (LGA) of Central Highlands in the Central LGA region of Tasmania. The locality is about 55 kilometres (34 mi) north of the town of Hamilton. The 2016 census recorded a population of nil for the state suburb of Hermitage.

== History ==
Hermitage was gazetted as a locality in 1966. The name is believed to come from the property of an early settler in the district.

== Geography ==
The River Ouse forms the western boundary. The Shannon River forms part of the eastern boundary before flowing through from east to south-west where it joins the Ouse.

== Road infrastructure ==
Route C178 (Waddamana Road) runs through from north to east.
