= Osterley, Tasmania =

Osterley Tasmania
- Coordinates: 42°20′16″S 146°44′07″E
- Population: 12 (2016 census)
- Postcode(s): 7140
- Location: 35 km (22 mi) N of Hamilton
- LGA(s): Central Highlands
- Region: Central
- State electorate(s): Lyons
- Federal division(s): Lyons
Localities around Osterley:
Victoria Valley	Victoria Valley	Hermitage
Victoria Valley	Osterley	Hermitage, Bothwell
Ouse	Ouse	Bothwell

Osterley is a rural locality in the local government area (LGA) of Central Highlands in the Central LGA region of Tasmania. The locality is about 35 kilometres (22 mi) north of the town of Hamilton. The 2016 census recorded a population of 12 for the state suburb of Osterley.

== History ==
Osterley was gazetted as a locality in 1973. The name was in use for a Town Reserve by 1845, but the locality was known as Native Tier until 1892.

== Geography ==
The River Ouse forms the eastern boundary.

== Road infrastructure ==
Route C173 (Victoria Valley Road) runs through from south to south-west.
