= Strickland, Tasmania =

Strickland
- Town
- Coordinates: 42°20′33″S 146°40′22″E
- Country: Australia
- State: Tasmania
- Region: Central
- LGA: Central Highlands
- Location: 35 km (22 mi) NW of Hamilton

Government
  - State electorate: Lyons
  - Federal division: Lyons

Population
  - Total: 13 (2016 census)
- Postcode: 7140
Localities around Strickland
| Dee | Victoria Valley | Victoria Valley |
| Ouse | Strickland | Ouse, Osterley |
| Ouse | Ouse | Ouse |

Strickland is a rural locality in the local government area of Central Highlands in the Central region of Tasmania. It is located about 35 kilometres (22 mi) north-west of the town of Hamilton. The 2016 census determined a population of 13 for the state suburb of Strickland.

== History ==
Strickland was gazetted as a locality in 1973. It was named for Gerald Strickland, Governor of Tasmania from 1904 to 1909.

== Geography ==
The Dee River forms much of the western boundary.

== Road infrastructure ==
The C176 route (Strickland Road) enters from the north and runs through to the south, where it exits.
