= Repulse Dam =

Dam and power station in Central Highlands, Tasmania, Australia

- Location of the dam in Tasmania
- Interactive map of Repulse Dam
- Country: Australia
- Location: Central Highlands Tasmania
- Coordinates: 42°30′23″S 146°38′48″E
- Purpose: Power
- Status: Operational
- Opening date: 1968
- Owner: Hydro Tasmania

Dam and spillways
- Type of dam: Arch dam
- Impounds: River Derwent
- Height: 42 m (138 ft)
- Length: 433 m (1,421 ft)
- Dam volume: 71×10^{3} m^{3} (2.5×10^{6} cu ft)
- Spillways: 1
- Spillway type: Uncontrolled
- Spillway capacity: 3,964 m^{3}/s (140,000 cu ft/s)

Reservoir
- Creates: Lake Repulse
- Total capacity: 15,900 ML (12,900 acre⋅ft)
- Catchment area: 2,820 km^{2} (1,090 sq mi)
- Surface area: 153 ha (380 acres)
- Normal elevation: 118 m (387 ft) AHD

Repulse Power Station
- Coordinates: 42°30′25″S 146°38′45″E
- Operator: Hydro Tasmania
- Commission date: 1967
- Type: Conventional
- Hydraulic head: 25 m (82 ft)
- Turbines: 1 x 29.1 MW (39,000 hp) (Boving Kaplan-type)
- Installed capacity: 29.1 MW (39,000 hp)
- Capacity factor: 0.8
- Annual generation: 153 GWh (550 TJ)
- Website hydro.com.au

The Repulse Dam is a concrete arch dam with an earth-filled embankment across the Lower River Derwent, located in the Central Highlands region of Tasmania, Australia. Completed in 1968, the resultant reservoir, Lake Repulse, was established for the purpose of generating hydro-electric power via the Repulse Power Station, a conventional hydroelectric power station.

The dam, its reservoir, and the power station are owned and operated by Hydro Tasmania.

== Dam and reservoir overview ==
The dam wall is 42 metres (138 ft) high and 433 metres (1,421 ft) long. When full, Lake Repulse has capacity of 15,900 megalitres (12,900 acre⋅ft) and covers 153 hectares (380 acres), draw from a catchment area of 2,820 square kilometres (1,090 sq mi). The single uncontrolled spillway is capable of discharging 3,964 cubic metres per second (140,000 cu ft/s).

The reservoir receives water from the Catagunya Dam. The reservoir is stocked with both brown trout and rainbow trout. In 2013, a man was charged under the Fire Service Act 1979 (TAS) after leaving a campfire unattended that resulted in the burning of over 10,000 hectares (25,000 acres) of bushland surrounding the reservoir.

== Hydroelectric power station ==
Part of the Derwent scheme that comprises eleven hydroelectric power stations, the Repulse Power Station is the eighth power station in the scheme and is located adjacent to the dam wall. The facilities at the Repulse Power Station are simple and include the dam, intake structure with intake gate designed to cut off full flow, a short penstock which is integral with the dam, power station building, generator equipment and associated facilities.

Approved by the Tasmanian Parliament in 1961, the power station was commissioned in 1967 by the Hydro Electric Corporation (TAS). The station has a single Boving Kaplan-type turbine with a generating capacity of 29.1 megawatts (39,000 hp). Within the station building, the turbine has a five-bladed runner and concrete spiral casing. Pre-stressed cables passing through the stay vanes anchor the spiral casing and form part of the station foundation. No inlet valve is installed in the station. The station output, estimated to be 153 gigawatt-hours (550 TJ) annually, is fed to TasNetworks' transmission grid via two 11 kV/220 kV Siemens generator transformers to the outdoor switchyard.

In 2019, Hydro Tasmania announced an upgrade of the power generating infrastructure.

Water discharged from the Repulse Power Station flows into the River Derwent via the Cluny Lagoon.

== See also ==
- List of power stations in Tasmania
- List of reservoirs and dams in Tasmania
