= Tarraleah Power Station =

Power station in Tasmania, Australia

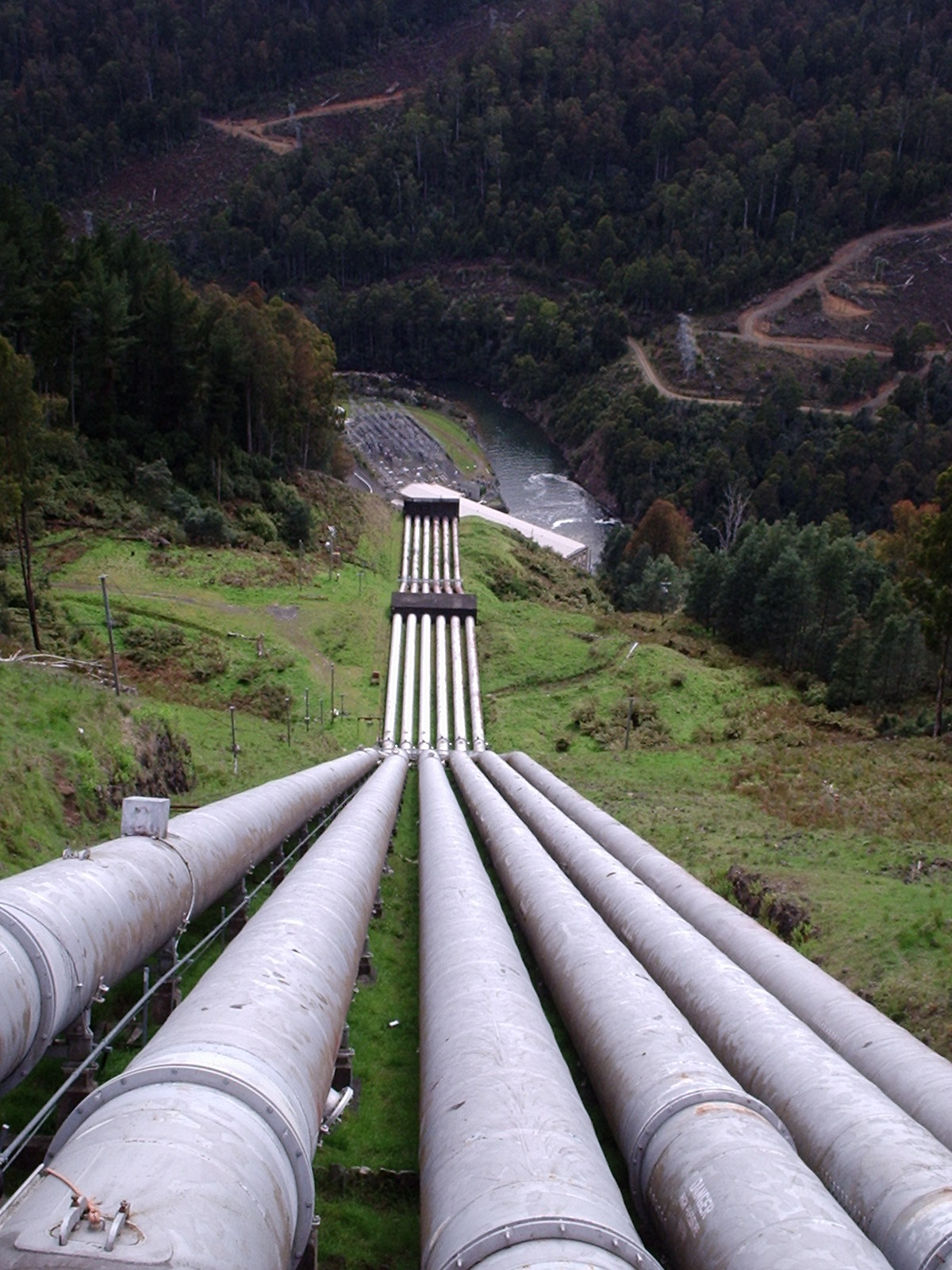
- Penstocks feeding the Tarraleah Power Station
- Country: Australia
- Location: Central Highlands, Tasmania
- Coordinates: 42°18′04″S 146°27′25″E
- Status: Operational
- Construction began: November 1934
- Opening date: July 1938: 1943-1951
- Owner(s): Hydro Tasmania

Reservoir
- Creates: Lake King William
- Total capacity: 539,340 ML (19,047×10^{6} cu ft)

Power Station
- Hydraulic head: 287 metres (942 ft)
- Turbines: 3 x 15 MW (20,000 hp) Boving Pelton-type turbines; 3 x 15 MW (20,000 hp) English Electric Pelton-type turbines
- Pump-generators: 6
- Pumps: 2
- Installed capacity: 90 MW (120,000 hp)
- Capacity factor: 0.8
- Annual generation: 684 GWh (2,460 TJ)
- Website hydro.com.au/energy/our-power-stations/derwent-0/tarraleah-power-station

The Tarraleah Power Station is a hydroelectric power station located in the Central Highlands, Tasmania, Australia. It is part of the Upper Derwent Hydro Scheme and is operated by Hydro Tasmania.

== History ==
The Upper River Derwent hydroelectric scheme was developed at a time in 1934 when the former Hydro-Electric Commission had only two working power stations. In 1934 the Derwent Valley Power Development power scheme was approved by the Parliament of Tasmania with the Tarraleah Power Station as the first completed power station of that scheme.

Ticklebelly Flat, the nickname for the married quarters at Tarraleah Camp number 2 in the 1930s, is a name for the history of Hydro Tasmania by Heather Fenton, known as Ticklebelly Tales.

== Power station ==
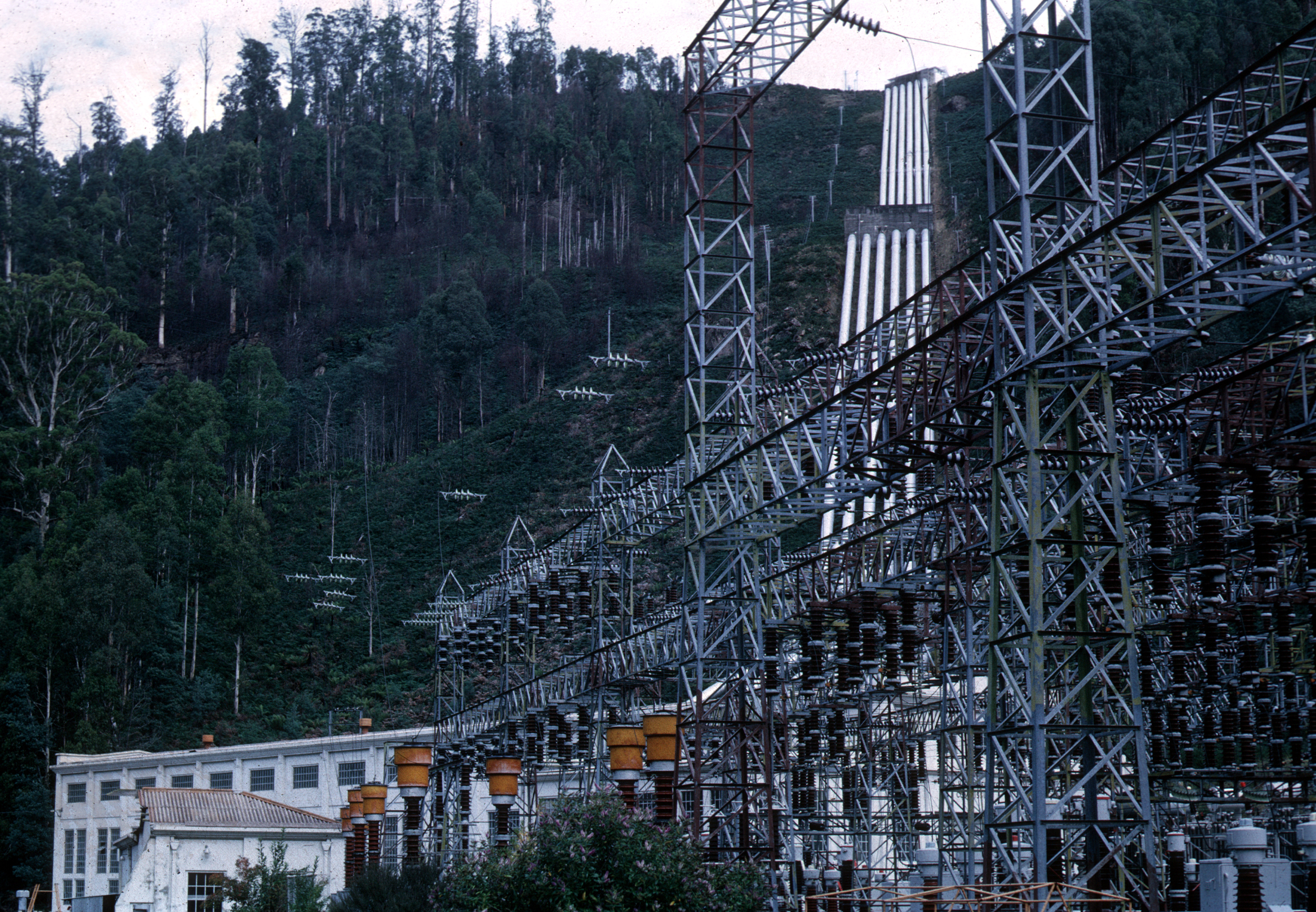
The outdoor switchyard located adjacent to the Tarraleah Power Station.

Part of the Derwent scheme that now comprises eleven hydroelectric power stations, the Tarraleah Power Station is located aboveground on the west bank of the Nive River downstream from the village of Tarraleah and a short distance from the Lyell Highway. The station draws its water from a variety of sources. Water from the concrete arched Clark Dam across the River Derwent that forms Lake King William flows from the lake and also from the Butlers Gorge Power Station around 25 kilometres (16 mi) via the Tarraleah Canals.

The power station was opened in July 1938 and has six Pelton-type turbines, with a generating capacity of 90 megawatts (120,000 hp) of electricity. The station output is fed to the transmission grid via 11 kV metal clad switchgear and two 11 /110 kV 75MVA 3-phase power transformers.

In March 2023, an upgrade of the power station commenced.

== Engineering heritage award ==
The Tarraleah hydro-electric development received a Historic Engineering Marker from Engineers Australia as part of its Engineering Heritage Recognition Program.
