= Tarraleah =

Locality in Tasmania, Australia

Tarraleah Tasmania
- Coordinates: 42°18′S 146°26′E
- Population: 0 (2016 census)
- Established: 1934
- Postcode(s): 7140
- Elevation: 630 m (2,067 ft)
- Location: 126 km (78 mi) NW of Hobart; 137 km (85 mi) E of Queenstown; 91 km (57 mi) NW of New Norfolk; 53 km (33 mi) NW of Hamilton
- LGA(s): Central Highlands
- Region: Central
- State electorate(s): Lyons
- Federal division(s): Lyons
Mean max temp	Mean min temp	Annual rainfall
13.8 °C; 57 °F	3.6 °C; 38 °F	1,168.2 mm 46 in
Localities around Tarraleah:
Bronte Park	Bronte Park, Dee	Dee
Butlers Gorge, Bronte Park	Tarraleah	Dee
Southwest	Wayatinah	Wayatinah

Tarraleah is a rural locality in the Local Government Area (LGA) of Central Highlands in the Central LGA region of Tasmania, Australia. In the 2016 census, a population of nil for the state suburb of Tarraleah was recorded.

A large section of the town was purchased in 2023 by Hydro Tasmania for $11 million.

== Geography ==
The locality is about 53 kilometres (33 mi) north-west of the town of Hamilton, 120 km north-west of the state capital Hobart, and slightly closer to Queenstown.

The Derwent River flows through from west to south, where it forms part of the southern boundary. Lake Binney is contained within the locality, as is Tarraleah Power Station.

== History ==
Tarraleah is Aboriginal for 'brush kangaroo' or 'forester kangaroo.'

The township was built in the 1930s by the Hydro Electric Commission to house Tasmania's pioneering hydroelectricity officers and management. The power scheme and headquarters at Tarraleah commenced in 1934.

Nive Road Post Office opened in 1934 and was renamed Tarraleah in 1935. Tarraleah was gazetted as a locality on 10 November 1971 and confirmed on 15 March 1972.

== Road infrastructure ==
The Lyell Highway passes through from south-east to north. Fourteen Mile Road starts at an intersection with Lyell Highway and runs north-west until it exits.

== Amenities ==
The area is noted for its alpine lakes and mountains, and many hydro-electric dams, canals and giant steel pipeways. Tarraleah is located along the Lyell Highway, and is only a short distance from both Lake King William and Bronte Lagoon. Lake Lipootah and Bradys Lake are also close by.

After a multimillion-dollar redevelopment, the former Hydro construction village has become an estate that comprises Tarraleah Lodge with accommodation, recreation, and dining options. Fresh water trout fishing, boating, bushwalking, mountain biking and kayaking are all popular activities in and around the township. Tarraleah is also home to a high-altitude golf course.
