= Victoria Valley, Tasmania =

Victoria Valley
- Town
- Coordinates: 42°18′52″S 146°42′54″E
- Country: Australia
- State: Tasmania
- Region: Central
- LGA: Central Highlands
- Location: 40 km (25 mi) NW of Hamilton

Government
  - State electorate: Lyons
  - Federal division: Lyons

Population
  - Total: 18 (SAL 2021)
- Postcode: 7140
Localities around Victoria Valley
London Lakes	Waddamana	Hermitage
Dee	Victoria Valley	Osterley, Hermitage
Dee	Strickland	Osterley

Victoria Valley is a rural locality in the local government area of Central Highlands in the Central region of Tasmania. It is located about 40 kilometres (25 mi) north-west of the town of Hamilton.

== History ==
Victoria Valley was gazetted as a locality in 1973.

The 2016 census determined a population of 11 for the state suburb of Victoria Valley. At the 2021 census, the population had increased to 18.

== Geography ==
The Ouse River forms the north-eastern boundary.

== Road infrastructure ==
The C173 route (Victoria Valley Road) enters from the south-east and runs through to the south-west, where it exits. Route C177 (Bashan Road) starts at an intersection with C173 and runs north through the locality before it exits.
