= London Lakes =

- Town
- Coordinates: 42°11′28″S 146°31′31″E
- Country: Australia
- State: Tasmania
- Region: Central
- LGA: Central Highlands
- Location: 76 km (47 mi) NW of Hamilton

Government
  - State electorate: Lyons
  - Federal division: Lyons

Population
  - Total: nil (2016 census)
- Postcode: 7140
Localities around London Lakes
Bronte Park	Bronte Park	Waddamana
Bronte Park	London Lakes	Waddamana
Tarraleah	Dee	Victoria Valley

London Lakes is a rural locality in the local government area (LGA) of Central Highlands in the Central LGA region of Tasmania. The locality is about 76 kilometres (47 mi) north-west of the town of Hamilton. The 2016 census recorded a population of nil for the state suburb of London Lakes.

== History ==
London Lakes is a confirmed locality.

== Geography ==
The Serpentine River (not the one in south-west Tasmania) forms part of the western boundary. The locality contains Lake Big Jim, Lake Samuel, Highland Waters and almost all of Lake Echo.

== Road infrastructure ==
Route C173 (Victoria Valley Road) runs through from south-west to south.

== See also ==
- Lake Echo Power Station
