= Bronte Park, Tasmania =

Bronte Park
- Town
- Coordinates: 42°08′S 146°30′E
- Country: Australia
- State: Tasmania
- Region: Central
- LGA: Central Highlands Council
- Location: 82 km (51 mi) NW of Hamilton
- Established: 1947

Government
  - State electorate: Lyons
  - Federal division: Lyons

Population
  - Total: 28 (2016 census)
- Postcode: 7140
- Mean max temp: 13.8 °C (56.8 °F)
- Mean min temp: 3.6 °C (38.5 °F)
- Annual rainfall: 1,168.2 mm (45.99 in)
Localities around Bronte Park
Central Plateau	Central Plateau	Miena
Derwent Bridge	Bronte Park	Waddamana
Butlers Gorge	Tarraleah	London Lakes, Bradys Lake

Bronte Park is a rural locality in the local government area (LGA) of Central Highlands in the Central LGA region of Tasmania. The locality is about 82 kilometres (51 mi) north-west of the town of Hamilton. The 2016 census recorded a population of 28 for the state suburb of Bronte Park. It is a locality on the Marlborough Highway at the southern edge of the Cradle Mountain-Lake St Clair National Park. It is located just north of the Lyell Highway and approximately halfway in between Hobart and Queenstown, and is also almost exactly in the geographic centre of the island.

Bronte Park is north of Bronte Lagoon, an artificial lake in the Central Highlands.

== History ==
Bronte Park was gazetted as a locality in 1963.

It is now primarily a tourist village catering to trout fishermen, kayakers and walkers, but was established in the 1940s as accommodation for workers on the Tasmanian Hydro Electric Commission's 'Tungatinah Scheme', 'Nive River Scheme' and other associated works in the vicinity. By the 1950s it was a bustling village of over 700 workers, with a store, police station, post office, school, cinema, hospital, dairy and a church, but now many of the original houses and buildings have been removed, with only a few remaining now as part of the Bronte Lagoon Chalet. Bronte Park Post Office opened on 1 July 1948 and closed in 1979. By 1991 the Hydro Electric Commission (now Hydro Tasmania) sold the chalets into private ownership.

== Geography ==
Most of the boundaries are survey lines.

== Road infrastructure ==
Route A10 (Lyell Highway) runs through from south-east to west. Route B11 (Marlborough Road) starts at an intersection with A10 and runs north through the locality.
