= Nutgrove Beach =

Suburban beach in Sandy Bay, Tasmania

- Beach
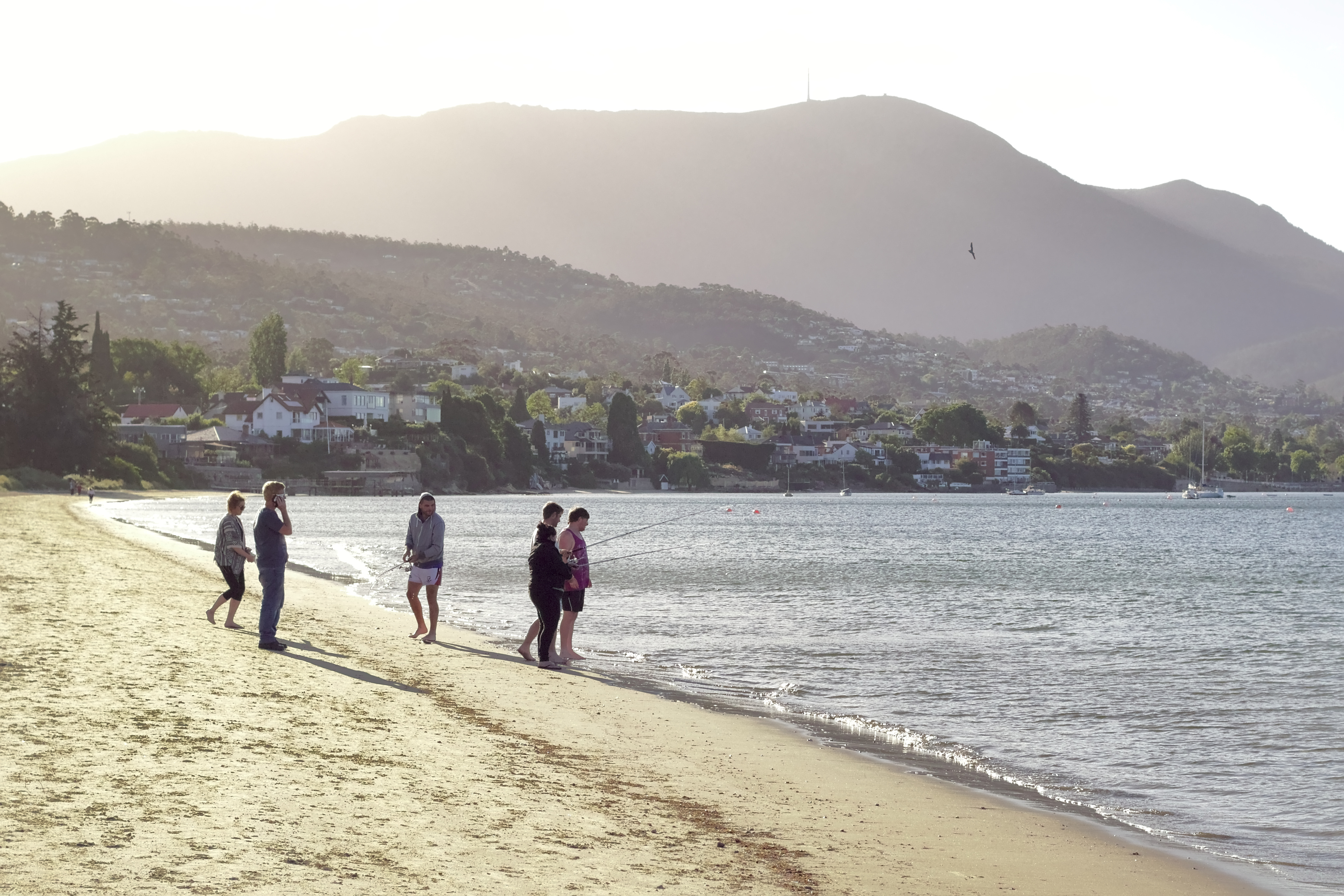
- Nutgrove Beach looking toward Sandy Bay homes and Mount Wellington

- Location within Hobart
- Coordinates: 42°54′31.64″S 147°21′4.21″E
- Location: Sandy Bay, Hobart, Tasmania, Australia
- Water bodies: River Derwent

Dimensions
  - Length: 700 m (2,300 ft)
- Patrolled by: Surf Life Saving Tasmania
- Hazard rating: 2/10 (Least hazardous)
- Access: Footpath, Nutgrove Avenue, Sandown Avenue

Nutgrove Beach is a popular beach destination along the River Derwent in Sandy Bay, Hobart, Tasmania. The north facing beach has views of Mount Wellington, Lords Beach, Wrest Point Hotel Casino, the Tasman Bridge, and the City of Clarence on the eastern shore. Nutgrove Beach neighbours Long Beach and Red Chapel Beach, and is close to the Sandy Bay Sailing Club and Lower Sandy Bay shops. The beach is dog-friendly and has bathroom facilities.

== History ==
Nutgrove Beach has historically been a popular staple of local activity, used for horse races, regattas, sailing races and swimming.

Prior to the British colonisation of Tasmania, the land had been occupied for possibly as long as 35,000 years by the semi-nomadic Mouheneener people, a sub-group of the Nuennone, or "South-East tribe". The Mouheneener held a permanent settlement on neighbouring Long Beach called kreewer.

Originally Nutgrove Beach was a continuation of Long Beach. As a means in preventing further foreshore erosion, a basalt seawall was constructed in the 1970s, dividing the beach in two. The new beach was named Nutgrove Beach after nearby Nutgrove House, an 1880s homestead built by John T. Read, a farmer who owned the Kinvarra Estate in Plenty. Read named his house "Nutgrove" after a small grove of walnut trees growing on the land. There were many apple, pear and nut orchards in Lower Sandy Bay in the 19th century. Nutgrove House still stands today.

== Marine life ==
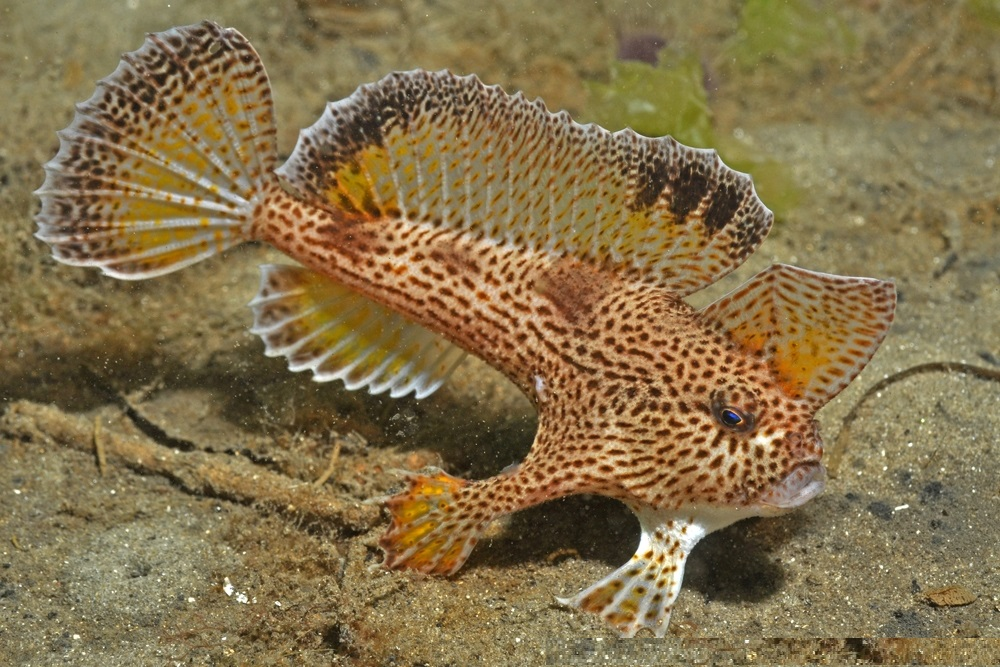
The critically endangered spotted handfish

Nutgrove Beach is home to many sea creatures, including the native smooth spotted shore crab (Paragrapsus laevis) and the critically endangered spotted handfish (Brachionichthys hirsutus). Though once a calving ground of the southern right whale (Eubalaena australis), it is now incredibly rare to sight a whale in the Derwent estuary. Whaling was banned in Australia in 1978, and ships are not to approach closer than 100 metres (330 ft) when encountering whales.

== Environment ==
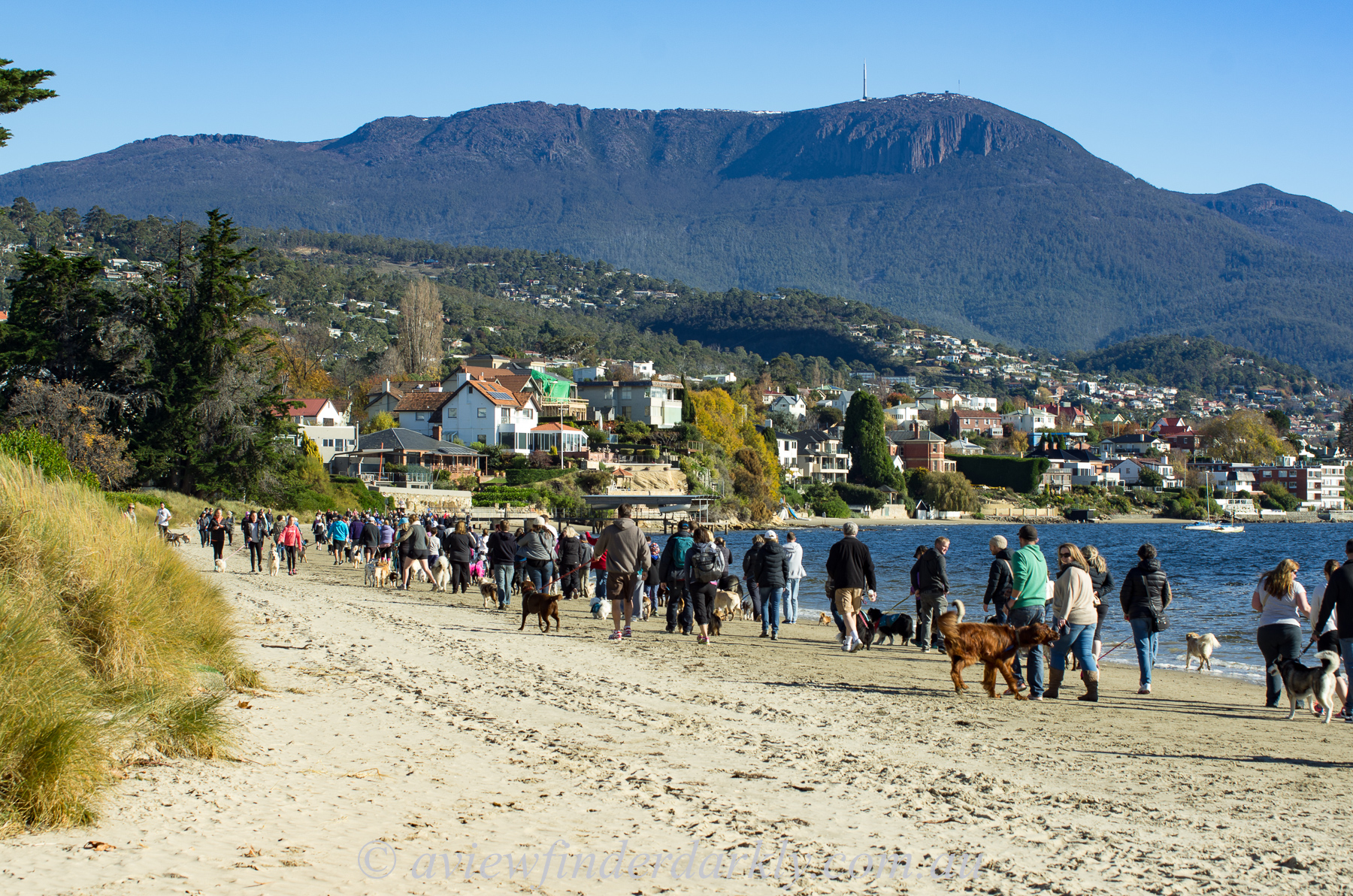
Walkers on the beach

In 2015, a survey report found that over 40 houses along Nutgrove beach are at risk from rising sea levels. In 2018, an annual report revealed that Blackmans Bay and Nutgrove Beach contained the worst water quality within the Derwent estuary.

== Access ==
Nutgrove Beach is a one-hour walk from the Hobart central business district, or a short Metro Tasmania bus ride along Sandy Bay Road.
