= Long Beach, Tasmania =

Suburban beach in Sandy Bay, Tasmania

Long Beach
- Beach
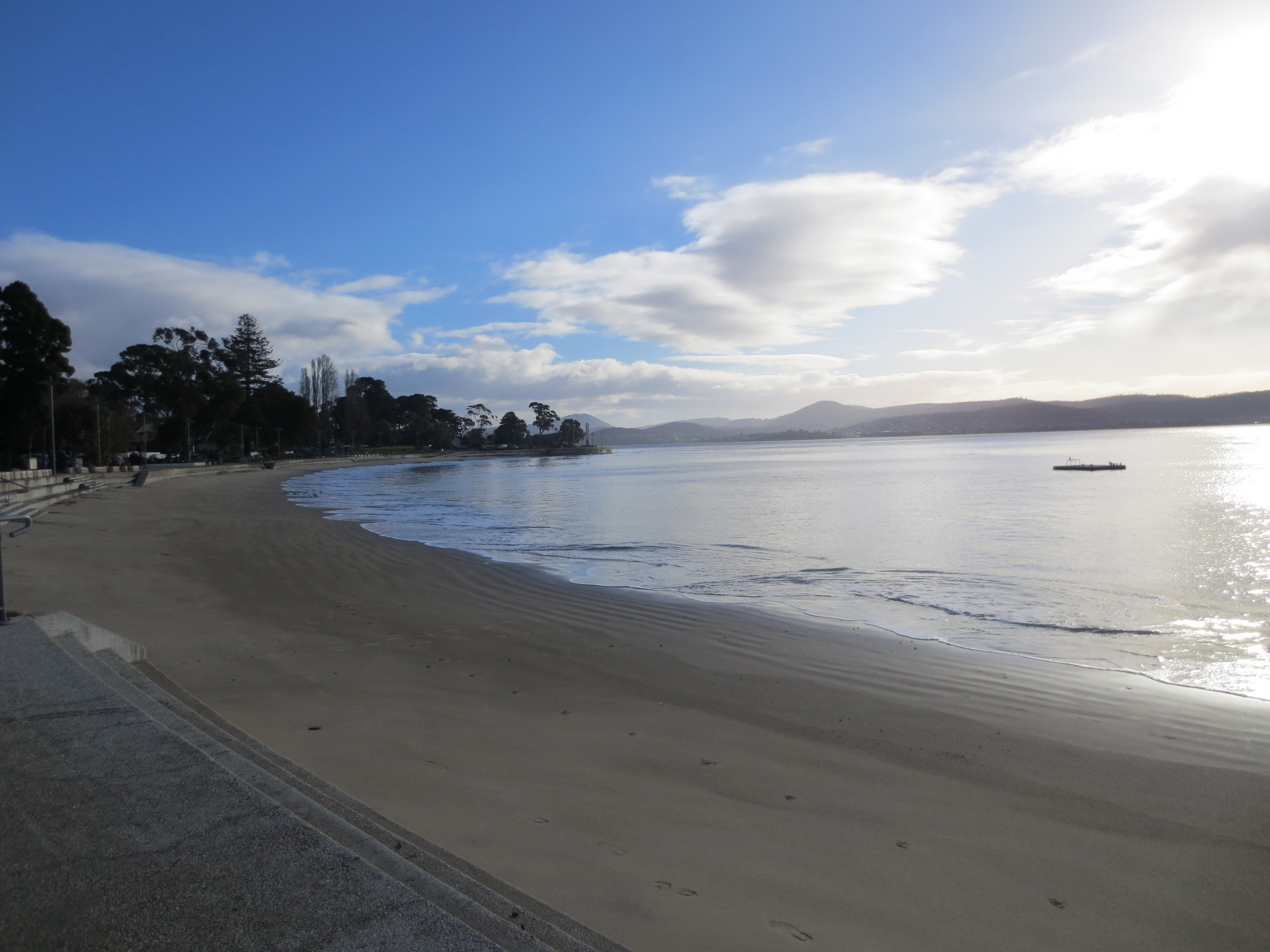
- Long Beach and the eastern shoreline in 2014.

- Location within Hobart
- Coordinates: 42°54′44.91″S 147°21′23.79″E
- Location: Sandy Bay, Hobart, Tasmania, Australia
- Water bodies: River Derwent

Dimensions
  - Length: 150 metres (490 ft)
- Patrolled by: Surf Life Saving Tasmania
- Hazard rating: 2/10 (Least hazardous)
- Access: Footpath, Beach Road, Sandy Bay Road

Long Beach is a popular beach destination along the River Derwent in Sandy Bay, Hobart, Tasmania. The east facing beach has views of the City of Clarence on the eastern shore and Blinking Billy Point. Long Beach neighbours Nutgrove Beach and is close to the Long Beach Reserve Playground, Sandy Bay Sailing Club, Sandy Bay Regatta Association, Hobart Pétanque Club and Lower Sandy Bay shops. Long Beach has a sea pontoon for swimmers and bathroom facilities.

== History ==
Long Beach has historically been a popular staple of local activity, used for horse races, regattas, sailing races and swimming. Prior to the British colonisation of Tasmania, the land had been occupied for possibly as long as 35,000 years by the semi-nomadic Mouheneener people, a sub-group of the Nuennone, or "South-East tribe". The Mouheneener held a permanent settlement at the beach called kreewer.

Volcanic stones dating back 26 million years are visible along on the banks of Long Beach and neighbouring Blinking Billy Point. The volcanic site was visited by Charles Darwin in 1836. In 1909, an expansion of the Esplanade running from Long Beach, Nutgrove Beach, Red Chapel Beach and Lords Beach was proposed.

Although trams had operated along Sandy Bay Road since 1893, a dedicated Long Beach terminus for the Hobart Municipal Tramway was opened in October 1913, with Sandy Bay Line trams terminating at the end of Beach Road. Trams arrived at Long Beach once an hour. The Sandy Bay Line was closed in 1952, and trams had ceased operations in Hobart entirely by 1960.

Originally a single continuous beach, a basalt seawall was built as a means to prevent coastal erosion in the 1970s, dividing Long Beach in half and creating Nutgrove Beach as it is known today. The first timber seawall was constructed on the foreshore of Long Beach in 1908.

Long Beach has hosted an evening Twilight Market twice monthly since 2018.

Since 2013, Long Beach has been the location of the Nude Solstice Swim as part of Dark Mofo celebrations. In 2022, the event attracted more than 2,000 participants.

Newly erected amenities at Long Beach won the Peter Willmott Award for Small Project Architecture considering its "delightful interpretation" of a public toilet block at the 2022 Tasmanian Architecture Awards. The facilities were also awarded the COLORBOND Award for Steel Architecture.

== Marine life ==
Long Beach is occasionally visited by Australian fur seals (Arctocephalus pusillus). Caused by microscopic plankton, a bioluminescence phenomenon intermittently occurs in the beach's waters in the evening.

== Environment ==
Since the 1950s, tide and swell-induced currents, coastal squeeze caused by the manmade seawall, harsh southerly winds and rain has resulted in the large scale erosion and retreat of Long Beach. In 1954, a large swell caused 55 metres (180 ft) of the concrete wall at Long Beach to break away from the promenade, causing £A1,000 damage. In 2015, a survey report found that over 40 houses in Lower Sandy Bay are at risk from rising sea levels.

== Gallery ==
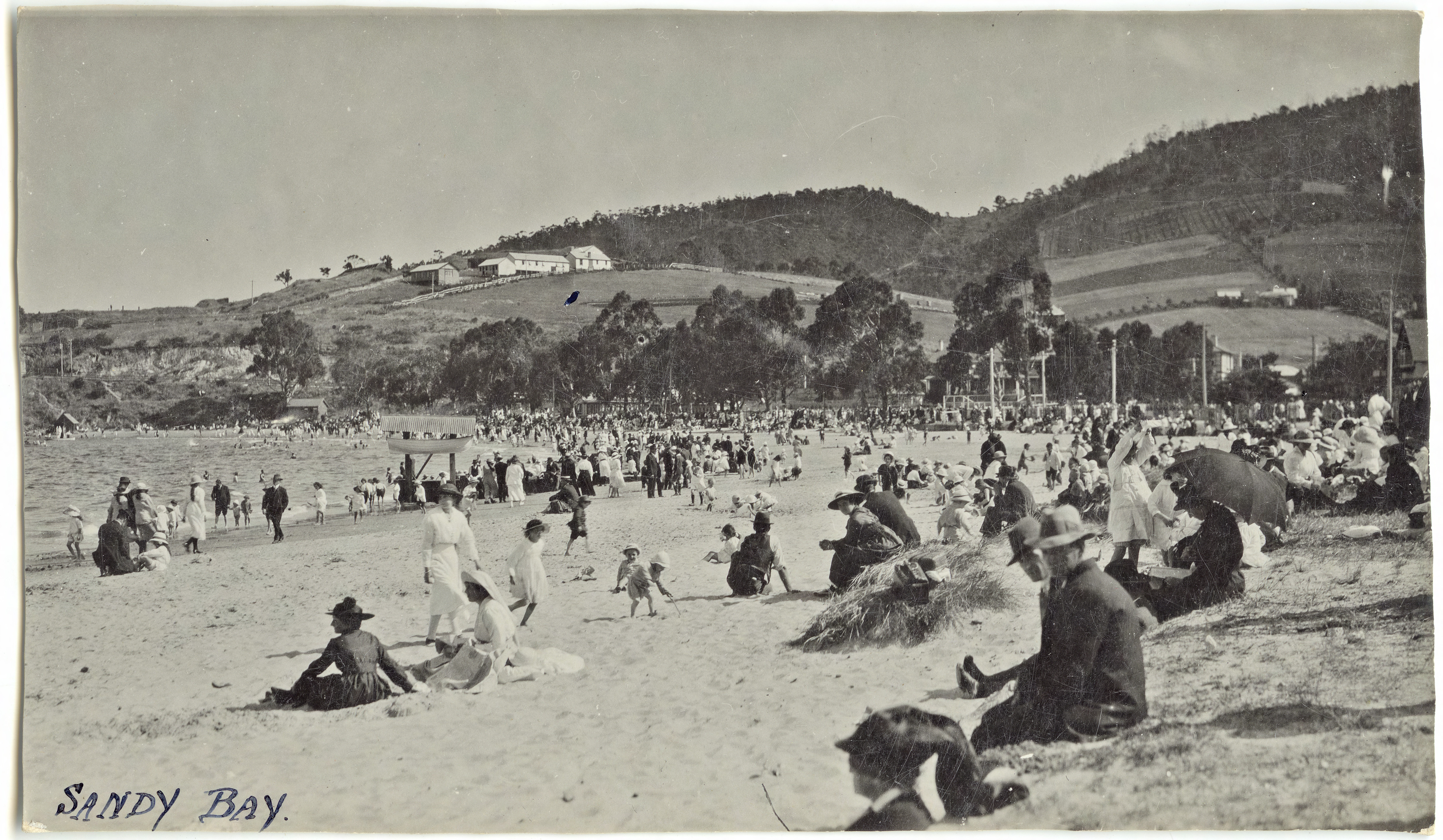
Sandy Bay Regatta at Long Beach circa 1920s

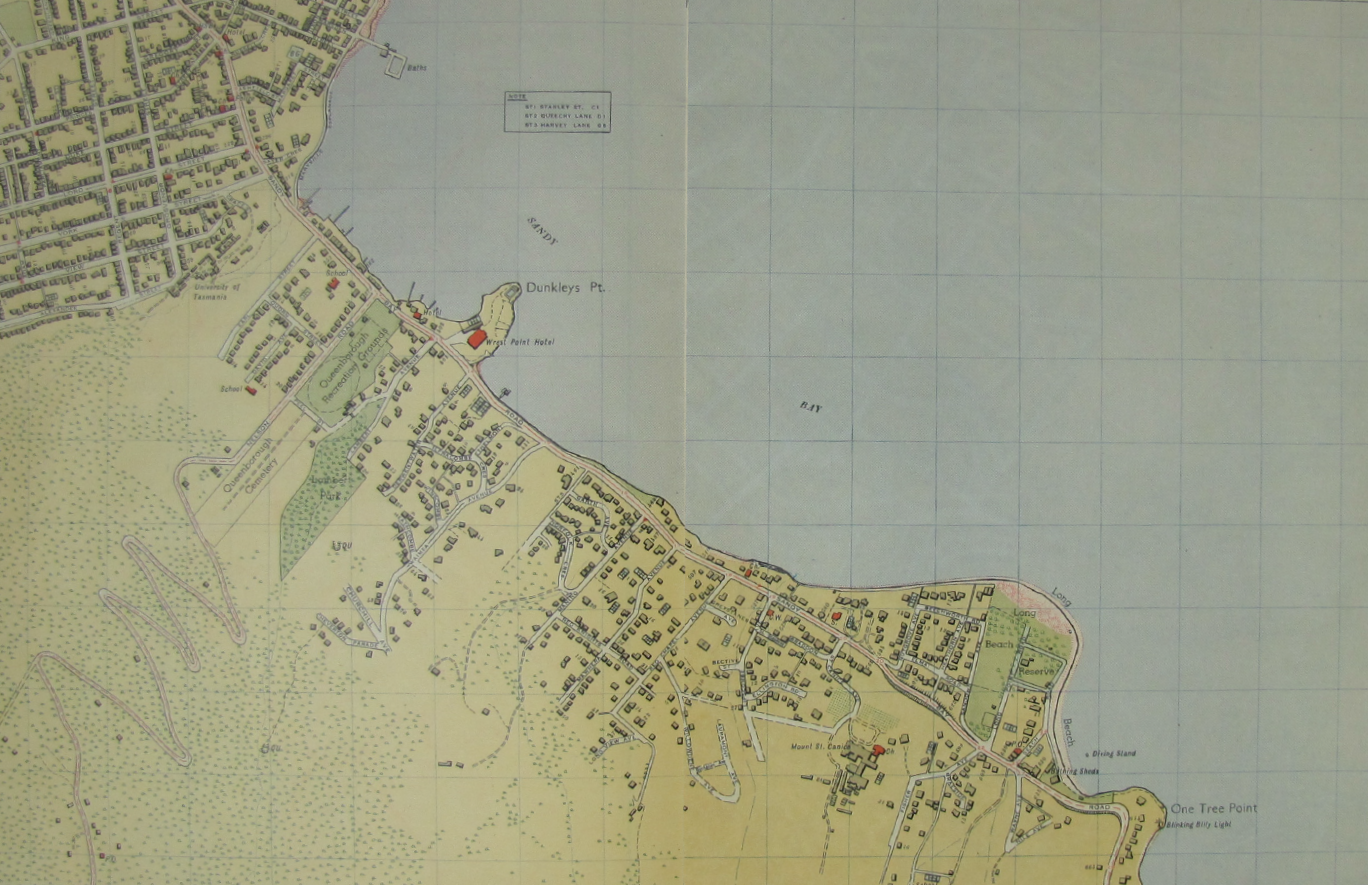
Map of Sandy Bay in 1954, depicting Long Beach and Nutgrove Beach as a single continuous beach

== Access ==
Long Beach is a one-hour walk from the Hobart City Centre, or a short metro bus ride along Sandy Bay Road. There is dedicated parking at the beach directly off Sandy Bay Road and Beach Road.
