= Cluny Dam =

Dam and hydroelectric power station in Tasmania, Australia

- Location of the dam in Tasmania
- Interactive map of Cluny Dam
- Country: Australia
- Location: Central Highlands Tasmania
- Coordinates: 42°30′24″S 146°40′55″E
- Purpose: Power
- Status: Operational
- Opening date: 1967
- Owner: Hydro Tasmania

Dam and spillways
- Type of dam: Gravity dam
- Impounds: River Derwent
- Height: 30 m (98 ft)
- Length: 204 m (669 ft)
- Dam volume: 28×10^{3} m^{3} (990×10^{3} cu ft)
- Spillways: 1
- Spillway type: Uncontrolled
- Spillway capacity: 4,248 m^{3}/s (150,000 cu ft/s)

Reservoir
- Creates: Cluny Lagoon
- Total capacity: 4,880 ML (3,960 acre⋅ft)
- Catchment area: 2,971 km^{2} (1,147 sq mi)
- Surface area: 8 ha (20 acres)
- Normal elevation: 98 m (322 ft) AHD

Cluny Power Station
- Coordinates: 42°30′00″S 146°40′48″E
- Operator: Hydro Tasmania
- Commission date: 1968
- Type: Conventional
- Hydraulic head: 15 m (49 ft)
- Turbines: 1 x 18.6 MW (24,900 hp) Boving Kaplan-type
- Installed capacity: 18.6 MW (24,900 hp)
- Capacity factor: 0.8
- Annual generation: 90 GWh (320 TJ)
- Website hydro.com.au

The Cluny Dam is a gravity dam across the Lower River Derwent, located in the Central Highlands region of Tasmania, Australia. Completed in 1967, the resultant reservoir, Cluny Lagoon, was established for the purpose of generating hydroelectricity by the Cluny Power Station, a conventional hydroelectric power station. The dam and power station are owned and operated by Hydro Tasmania.

== Dam overview ==
Built by the Hydro Electric Corporation (TAS) in 1967, the concrete dam wall is 30 metres (98 ft) high and 204 metres (669 ft) long. When full, the reservoir has capacity of 4,880 megalitres (3,960 acre⋅ft) and covers 80 hectares (200 acres), drawn from a catchment area of 2,971 square kilometres (1,147 sq mi). The uncontrolled spillway has a flow capacity of 4,248 cubic metres per second (150,000 cu ft/s). The reservoir receives water from the Repulse Dam.

== Hydroelectric power station ==
Part of the Derwent scheme that comprises eleven hydroelectric power stations, the Cluny Power Station is the tenth power station in the scheme. The power station is located aboveground below the Cluny Lagoon. The facilities at the Cluny Power Station are simple and include the dam, intake structure with intake gate designed to cut off full flow, a short penstock which is integral with the dam, power station building, generator equipment and associated facilities.

The power station was commissioned in 1967 by the Hydro Electric Corporation and has a single Boving Kaplan-type turbine with a generating capacity of 18.6 megawatts (24.9×10^{3} hp) of electricity. Within the station building, the turbine has a four-bladed runner and concrete spiral casing. Pre-stressed cables passing through the stay vanes anchor the spiral casing and form part of the station foundation. No inlet valve is installed in the station. The station output, estimated to be 90 gigawatt-hours (320 TJ) annually, is fed to TasNetworks' transmission grid via an 11 kV/220 kV Siemens generator transformer to the outdoor switchyard.

Water discharged from the Cluny Power Station flows into the River Derwent.

== See also ==
- List of power stations in Tasmania
- List of reservoirs and dams in Tasmania
