= Bronte Lagoon =

Lake in Tasmania, Australia

Coordinates: 42°11′38″S 146°29′10″E

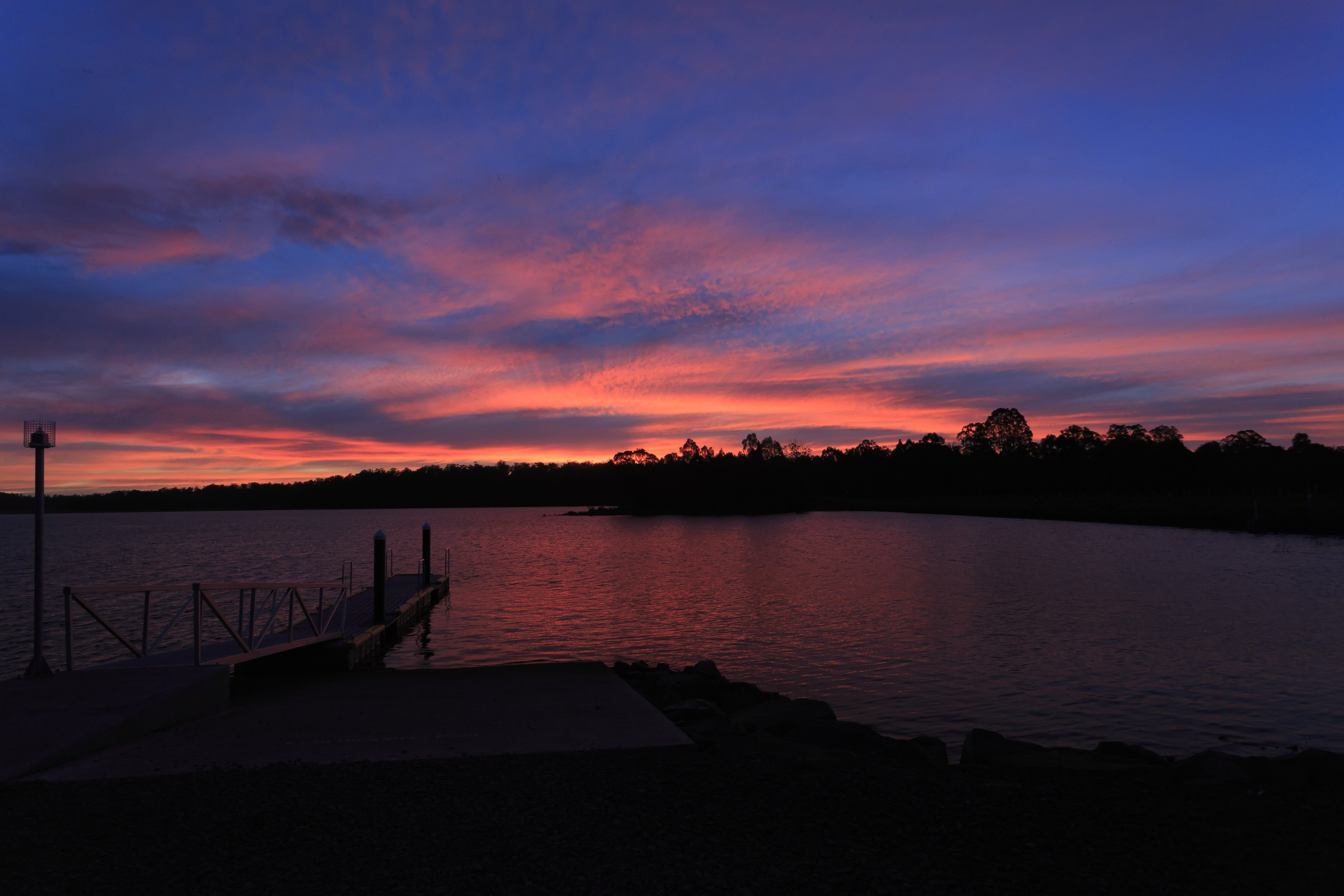
Lake Bronte Lagoon (Tasmania) at dawn

Bronte Lagoon is a lake that was created by Hydro Tasmania in the 1950s along with Bradys Lake, Lake Binney and Tungatinah Lagoon as water storages for the Tungatinah Power Station on the Nive River.

It is located in the Central Highlands of Tasmania south of Lyell Highway, connected to Brady's Lake by Woodwards Canal.

It is an area where holiday shacks have been made on crown land.

Bronte Park, the location north of this lake, on the other side of the Lyell Highway, was in the late 1940s and early 1950s a Hydro Tasmania construction village for the Nive Development (later known as the Tarraleah Power Development)
