= Dee, Tasmania =

Dee
- Town
- Coordinates: 42°14′43″S 146°33′54″E
- Country: Australia
- State: Tasmania
- Region: Central
- LGA: Central Highlands
- Location: 53 km (33 mi) NW of Hamilton

Government
  - State electorate: Lyons
  - Federal division: Lyons

Population
  - Total: 7 (2016 census)
- Postcode: 7140
Localities around Dee
| London Lakes | London Lakes | Waddamana |
| Tarraleah | Dee | Strickland, Victoria Valley |
| Ouse | Ouse | Strickland |

Dee is a rural locality in the local government area (LGA) of Central Highlands in the Central LGA region of Tasmania. The locality is about 53 kilometres (33 mi) north-west of the town of Hamilton. The 2016 census recorded a population of 7 for the state suburb of Dee.

== History ==
Dee was gazetted as a locality in 1973.

Dee was the site of a telegraph relay station on the only telegraph link to the west coast in earlier days.

== Geography ==
The Dee Lagoon is in the centre of the locality, contained by the Dee Dam. The Dee River flows into the lagoon from the north, and continues south from the dam.

== Road infrastructure ==
Route C173 (Victoria Valley Road) runs through from north-west to south-east.
