= Clark Dam =

Dam and power station in Tasmania, Australia

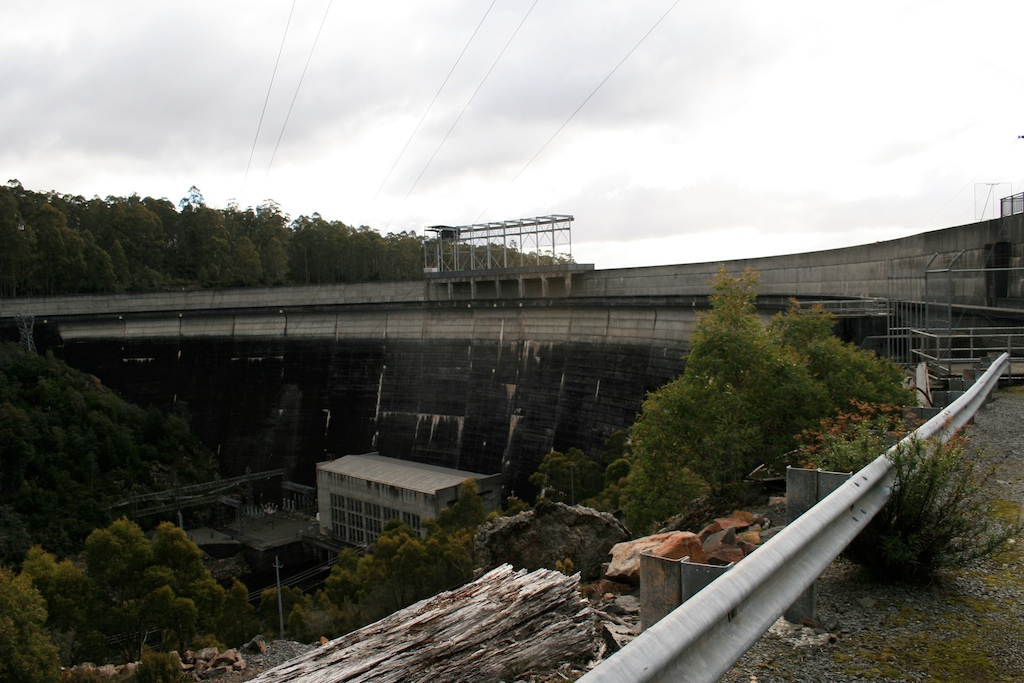
- The arched dam wall in 2008. The power stations are co-located at the base

- Location of the dam in Tasmania
- Interactive map of Clark Dam
- Country: Australia
- Location: Central Highlands, Tasmania
- Coordinates: 42°16′00″S 146°15′42″E
- Purpose: Power
- Status: Operational
- Opening date: 1949
- Owner: Hydro Tasmania

Dam and spillways
- Type of dam: Arch dam
- Impounds: Upper River Derwent
- Height: 67 m (220 ft)
- Length: 378 m (1,240 ft)
- Dam volume: 159×10^{3} m^{3} (5.6×10^{6} cu ft)
- Spillways: 1
- Spillway type: Controlled
- Spillway capacity: 687 m^{3}/s (24,300 cu ft/s)

Reservoir
- Creates: Lake King William
- Total capacity: 539,340 ML (437,250 acre⋅ft)
- Catchment area: 575 km^{2} (222 sq mi)
- Surface area: 4,167.9 ha (10,299 acres)
- Normal elevation: 683 m (2,241 ft) AHD

Butlers Gorge Power Station
- Coordinates: 42°15′36″S 146°15′36″E
- Operator: Hydro Tasmania
- Commission date: 1951
- Type: Conventional
- Hydraulic head: 49 m (161 ft)
- Turbines: 1 x 12.20 MW (16,360 hp); English Electric Francis-type
- Installed capacity: 12.2 MW (16,400 hp)
- Capacity factor: 0.8
- Annual generation: 684 GWh (2,460 TJ)
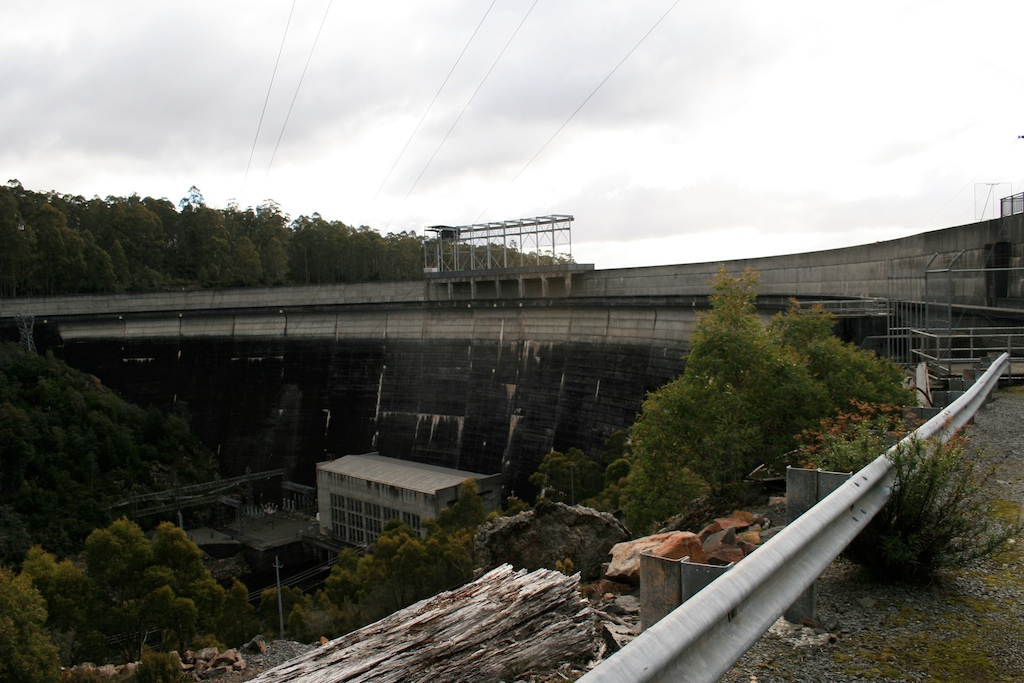

Nieterana Power Station
- Coordinates: 42°15′36″S 146°15′36″E
- Operator: Hydro Tasmania
- Commission date: 2004
- Type: Mini-hydro
- Hydraulic head: 30 m (98 ft)
- Turbines: 1 x 2.2 MW (3,000 hp) (Boving Fouress Bangalore Francis-type)
- Installed capacity: 2.2 MW (3,000 hp)
- Capacity factor: 0.9
- Website hydro.com.au

The Clark Dam is a concrete arch dam across the River Derwent, located near the settlement of Butlers Gorge, in the Central Highlands region of Tasmania, Australia. Completed in 1949, the resultant reservoir, Lake King William, was established for the purpose of generation of hydroelectricity via the adjacent Butlers Gorge Power Station, a conventional hydroelectric power station and by the co-located Nieterana Power Station, a mini-hydro power station.

The dam, its reservoir, and the two power stations are owned and operated by Hydro Tasmania.

== Dam and reservoir overview ==
The dam wall is 67 metres (220 ft) high and 378 metres (1,240 ft) long. When full, Lake King William has capacity of 539.34 gigalitres (437,250 acre⋅ft) and covers 4,145 hectares (10,240 acres), drawn from a catchment area of 575 square kilometres (222 sq mi). The controlled spillway has a flow capacity of 687 cubic metres per second (24,300 cu ft/s). In 1966, the dam wall was raised by 6 metres (20 ft) to its current height, via a prestressed cantilever concrete wall.

The Cradle Mountain-Lake St Clair National Park, a component of the UNESCO-listed Tasmanian Wilderness World Heritage Area, has its boundary to the north of the reservoir's shore.

== Hydroelectric power stations ==
=== Butlers Gorge Power Station ===
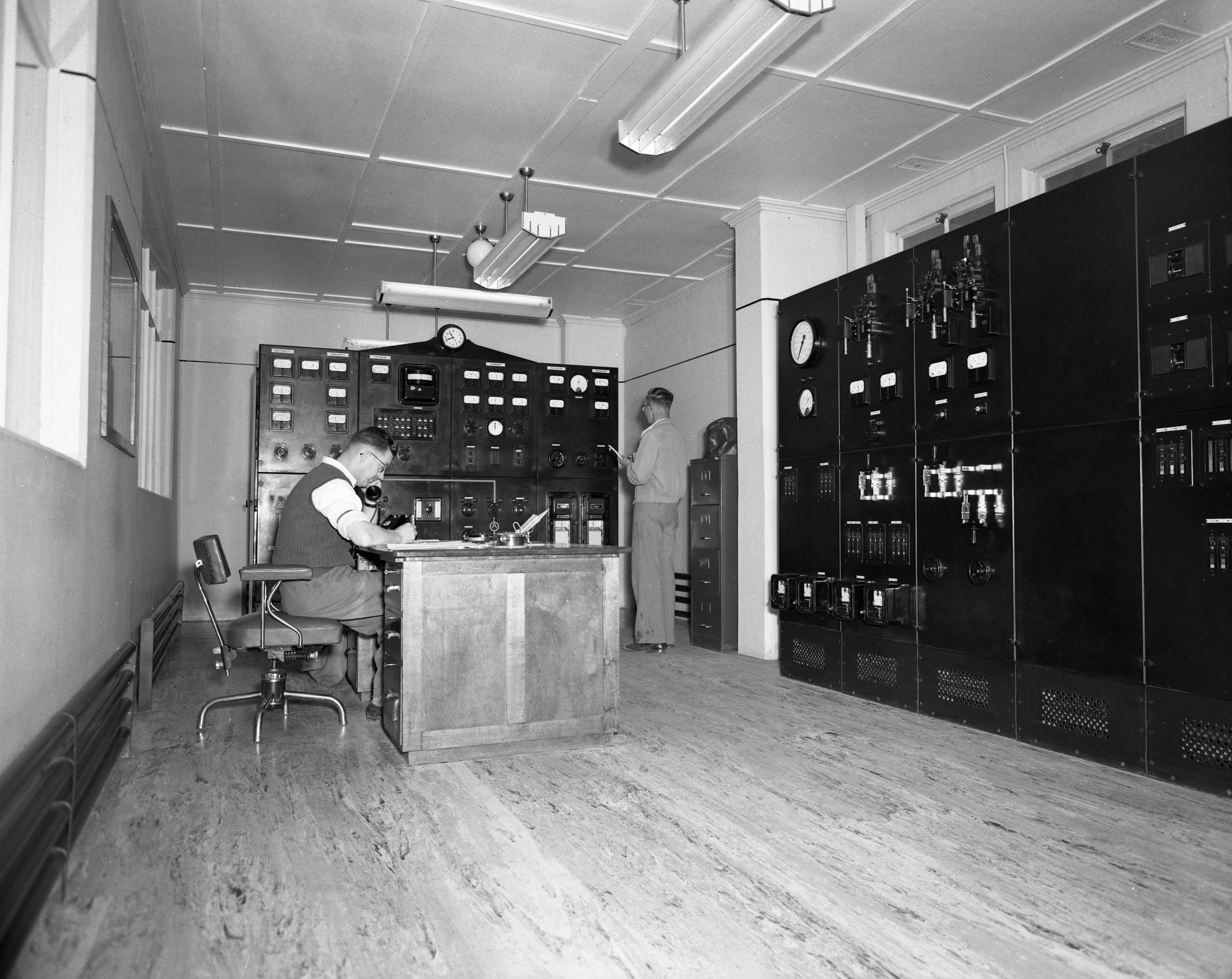
Control room, 1953

Part of the Derwent scheme that comprises eleven hydroelectric power stations, the Butlers Gorge Power Station is the first station in the scheme. The power station is located above ground at the foot of the dam wall. Water from the reservoir is fed to the power station, coupled to one of two discharge regulating valves to ensure water flow to Tarraleah Power Station located further downstream.

The power station was commissioned in 1951 by the Hydro Electric Corporation (TAS) and officially opened on 22 November 1952. The station has one English Electric Francis-type turbine, with a generating capacity of 12.2 megawatts (16,400 hp) of electricity. The station building houses a single alternator and the turbine has a fully embedded spiral casing with water flow controlled via a butterfly type valve. It also houses a 125-kVA diesel generator for alternate station services supply when needed. The station output, estimated to be 684 gigawatt-hours (2,460 TJ) annually, is fed to TasNetworks' transmission grid via an 11 kV/110 kV three-phase English Electric generator transformer to the outdoor switchyard.

=== Nieterana Power Station ===
The water discharged from the Butlers Gorge Power Station flows via three conduits to either the Nieterana mini-hydro, Tarraleah Power Station, or to Wally's Weir and back into the Derwent. The Nieterana Power Station takes advantage of the energy potential from water dissipating from the Butlers Gorge Power Station into Tarraleah No. 2 canal. The mini-hydro station can only be used when the Lake King William lake level is between 709.2 metres (2,327 ft) and 720.7 metres (2,365 ft).

The power station was commissioned in 2004 by Hydro Tasmania and the station has one horizontal Boving Fouress Bangalore Francis-type turbine, with a generating capacity of 2.2 megawatts (3,000 hp) of electricity. The station output is fed to TasNetworks' transmission grid via an existing 11 kV/110 kV three-phase English Electric generator transformer to the outdoor switchyard.

Nieterana is the aboriginal word for little brother.

== See also ==
- List of power stations in Tasmania
- List of reservoirs and dams in Tasmania
- List of lakes of Australia § Tasmania
