= Ticklebelly Tales =

History of the Hydro Electric Commission in Tasmania, Australia

- Author: Heather Felton
- Publisher: Hydro Tasmania
- Publication date: 2008
- ISBN: 9780646592596

Ticklebelly Tales (subtitled and other stories from the people of the Hydro) by Heather Felton, was a book published in 2008 about the people who had worked for the Hydro Electric Commission of Tasmania from 1910 to 2006.

== History ==
The comprehensive history included institutional details as well as personal anecdotes. A later edition was published in 2013.

Earlier histories of the HEC exist - Garvies' A Million Horses of 1962 and Roger Luptons' Lifeblood of 2000, however Fenton's style and the production of the Ticklebelly Tales volume includes details of over many interviews and extensive photographic material.

Oral history material held in the Tasmanian state archives that Felton was involved in collecting, include interviews with former Hydro engineers that are mentioned in the book, such as:

- Transcript 1 (no tape) - Bruce Cole, Dams design engineer HEC, Tasmania: Project Director- Anthony & King River Power Developments; Assistant Chief Civil Engineer, Design. Dam Expert -Australian Development Assistance Bureau; Dam Safety reviews. Liapootah drum gate, Catagunya prestressed Dam, Rileys Ck Dam, Repulse arch dam, Scotts Peak Dam troubles, Aid expert dispersive soil problems Thailand, rockfill dams, Dam Safety Committee, site revegetation, archaeology survey. Interviewer Heather Fenton
- Item Number: NS2247/1/24 Date: 21 Mar 2005

The book was reviewed in local newspapers, such as the New Norfolk-based Gazette, and promoted in the Launceston Examiner.
