= Catagunya Dam =

Dam and hydroelectric power station in Tasmania, Australia

- Location of the dam in Tasmania
- Country: Australia
- Location: Central Highlands Tasmania
- Coordinates: 42°26′24″S 146°35′24″E
- Purpose: Power
- Status: Operational
- Opening date: 1962
- Owner: Hydro Tasmania

Dam and spillways
- Type of dam: Gravity dam
- Impounds: River Derwent
- Height: 49 m (161 ft)
- Length: 282 m (925 ft)
- Dam volume: 92×10^{3} m^{3} (3.2×10^{6} cu ft)
- Spillways: 1
- Spillway type: Uncontrolled
- Spillway capacity: 3,594 m^{3}/s (126,900 cu ft/s)

Reservoir
- Creates: Lake Catagunya
- Total capacity: 25,640 ML (20,790 acre⋅ft)
- Catchment area: 2,713 km^{2} (1,047 sq mi)
- Surface area: 21.9 ha (54 acres)

Catagunya Power Station
- Coordinates: 42°27′00″S 146°35′24″E
- Operator: Hydro Tasmania
- Commission date: 1960
- Type: Run-of-the-river
- Hydraulic head: 44 m (144 ft)
- Turbines: 2 x 25 MW (34,000 hp) Boving Francis-type turbines
- Installed capacity: 48 MW (64,000 hp)
- Capacity factor: 0.8
- Annual generation: 237 GWh (850 TJ)
- Website hydro.com.au

The Catagunya Dam is a gravity dam across the Lower River Derwent, located in the Central Highlands region of Tasmania, Australia. Completed in 1962, the resultant reservoir, Lake Catagunya, was established for the purpose of generating hydroelectricity via the adjacent Catagunya Power Station, a run-of-the-river hydroelectric power station. Both the dam and the power station are owned and operated by Hydro Tasmania.

== Dam overview ==
Built by the Hydro Electric Corporation (TAS), the concrete dam wall is 49 metres (161 ft) high and 282 metres (925 ft) long. When full, Lake Catagunya has capacity of 25,640 megalitres (20,790 acre⋅ft) and covers 219 hectares (540 acres), drawn from a catchment area of 2,713 square kilometres (1,047 sq mi). The uncontrolled spillway has a flow capacity of 3,594 cubic metres per second (126,900 cu ft/s).

The dam received a Historic Engineering Marker from Engineers Australia as part of its Engineering Heritage Recognition Program.

== Hydroelectric power station ==
Part of the Derwent scheme that comprises eleven hydroelectric power stations, the Catagunya Power Station is the seventh power station in the scheme and the third power station in the lower run-of-river system. The power station is located above ground, below Lake Catagunya. Water from the Derwent from Wayatinah Power Station and spill from Wayatinah Dam flows into Lake Catagunya. Water in the lake is diverted by a flume at the dam to the radial gates. It then descends 49 metres (161 ft) through two steel penstocks to the power station.

The power station was commissioned in 1962 by the Hydro Electric Corporation and the station has two 25-megawatt (34×10^{3} hp) Boving Francis-type turbines, with a combined generating capacity of 48 megawatts (64,000 hp) of electricity. Within the station building, each turbine has a semi-embedded spiral casing, and water flow is controlled via twin radial gates installed at the entrance to each penstock and designed to cut off full flow. No inlet valves are installed in the station. The station output, estimated to be 237 gigawatt-hours (850 TJ) annually, is fed to TasNetworks' transmission grid via two 11 kV/220 kV ASEA generator transformers to the outdoor switchyard.

== See also ==
- List of power stations in Tasmania
- List of reservoirs and dams in Tasmania
- List of run-of-the-river hydroelectric power stations
