= River Derwent (Tasmania) =

River in south east Tasmania, Australia

Derwent
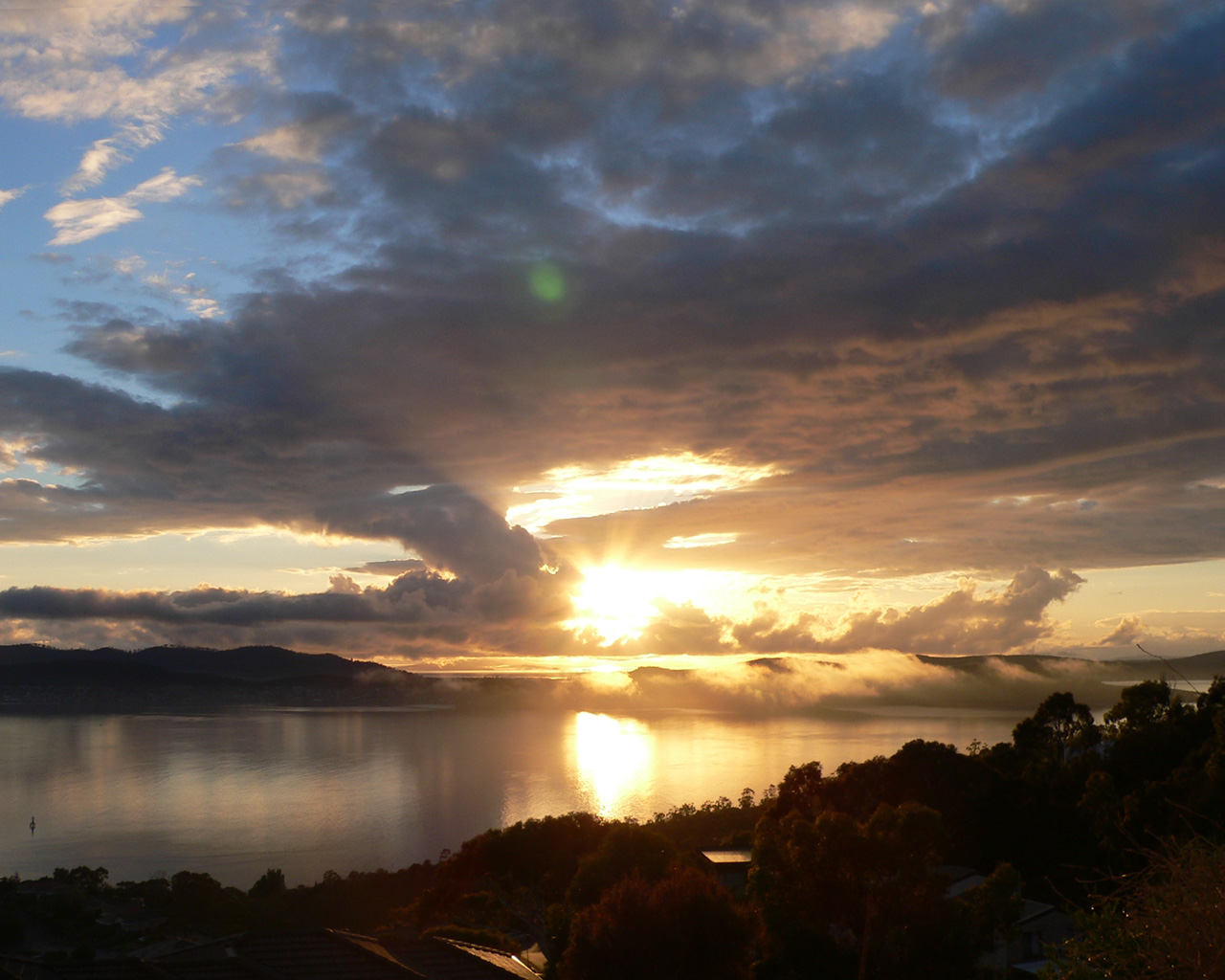
- Sunrise over the River Derwent

- Location of the river mouth in Tasmania
- Etymology: River Derwent, Cumbria
- Native name: timtumili minanya (Mouheneenner language)

Location
- Country: Australia
- State: Tasmania
- Cities: Derwent Bridge, New Norfolk, Hobart

Physical characteristics
- Source: Lake St Clair
  - location: Central Highlands
- Source confluence: Narcissus River; Cuvier River
  - location: Cradle Mountain-Lake St Clair National Park
  - coordinates: 42°7′12″S 146°12′37″E
  - elevation: 738 m (2,421 ft)
- Mouth: Storm Bay
  - location: Hobart
  - coordinates: 43°3′3″S 147°22′38″E
  - elevation: 0 m (0 ft)
- Length: 239 km (149 mi)
- Basin size: 9,832 km^{2} (3,796 sq mi)
- Discharge
  - location: Storm Bay
  - average: 90 m^{3}/s (3,200 cu ft/s)
  - minimum: 50 m^{3}/s (1,800 cu ft/s)
  - maximum: 140 m^{3}/s (4,900 cu ft/s)

Basin features
- Tributaries
  - left: Nive; Dee; Ouse; Clyde; Jordan
  - right: Repulse; Tyenna; Styx; Plenty; Lachlan
- Waterbodies: Saint Clair Lagoon; Lake St Clair
- Bridges: Derwent; Wayatinah; Lake Repulse Road; Upper Meadowbank; Bushy Park; Blair Street; Bridgewater; Bowen; Tasman
- Dams: Clark; Wayatinah; Catagunya; Repulse; Cluny; Meadowbank; King William

The River Derwent is a river in Tasmania, Australia, also known by the palawa kani name timtumili minanya. The river rises in the state's Central Highlands at Lake St Clair, and descends more than 700 metres (2,300 ft) over a distance of more than 200 kilometres (120 mi), flowing through Hobart, the state's capital city, before emptying into Storm Bay and flowing into the Tasman Sea. The banks of the Derwent were once covered by forests and occupied by Aboriginal Tasmanians. European settlers farmed the area, and during the 20th century many dams were built on its tributaries for the generation of hydro-electricity.

Agriculture, forestry, hydropower generation and fish hatcheries dominate catchment land use. The Derwent is also an important source of water for irrigation and water supply. Most of Hobart's water supply comes from the lower River Derwent. Nearly 40% of Tasmania's population lives around the estuary's margins and the Derwent is widely used for recreation, boating, recreational fishing, marine transportation and industry.

== Etymology ==
The upper part of the river was named after the River Derwent, Cumbria by British Commodore John Hayes who explored it in 1793. The name is Brythonic Celtic for "valley thick with oaks". Matthew Flinders placed the name "Derwent River" on all of the river. The name "River Derwent" was officially endorsed on 20 May 1959.

== History ==
The River Derwent valley was inhabited by the Muwinina people for at least 8,000 years before British settlement. Evidence of their occupation is found in many middens along the banks of the river. The first European to chart the river was Bruni d'Entrecasteaux, who named it the Rivière du Nord in 1793. Later that same year, John Hayes explored the river and named it after the River Derwent, which runs past his birthplace of Bridekirk, Cumberland.

When first explored by Europeans, the lower parts of the valley were clad in thick she-oak forests, remnants of which remain in various parts of the lower foreshore.

There was a thriving whaling industry until the 1840s when the industry rapidly declined due to over-exploitation.

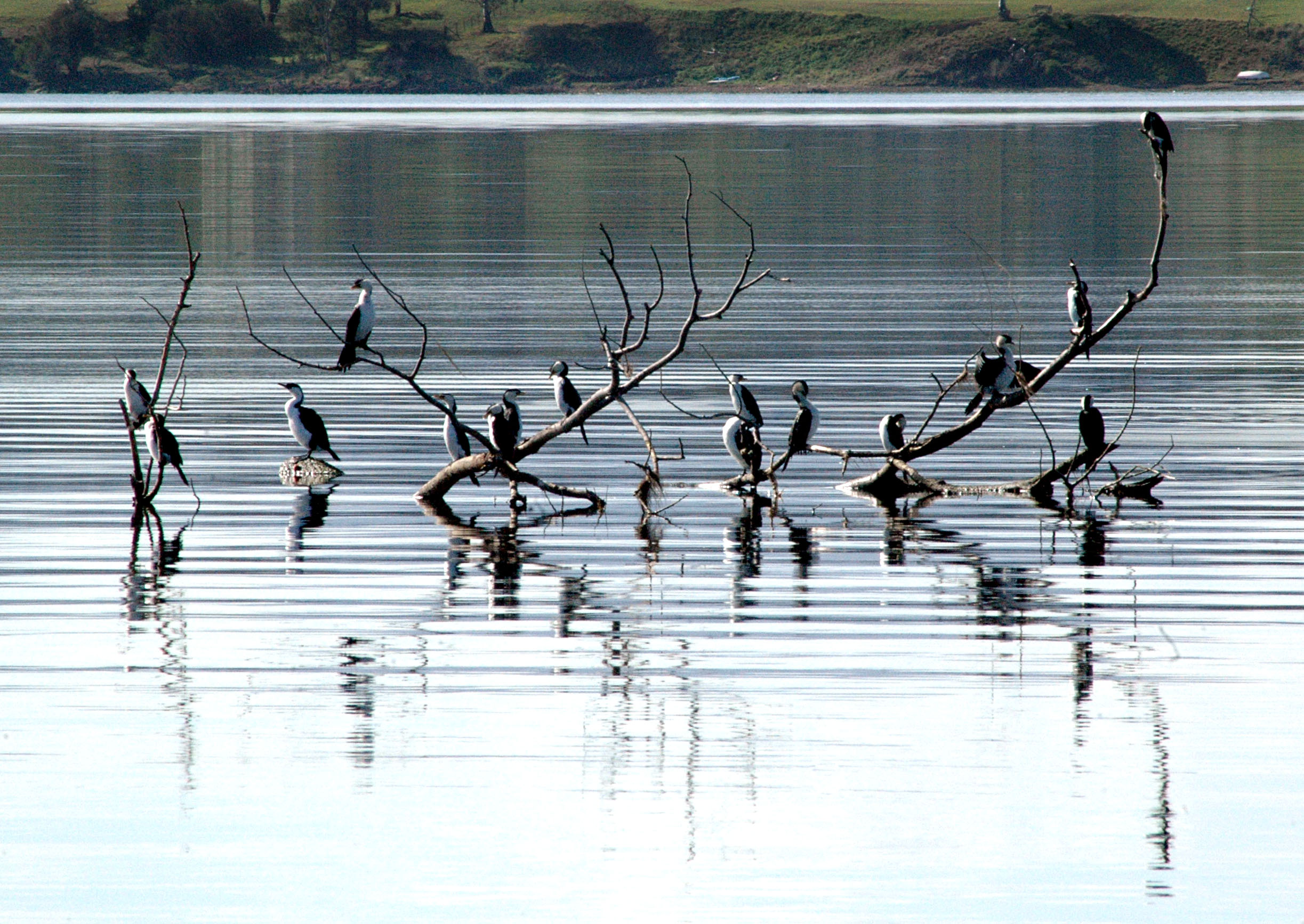
Little pied cormorants on the River Derwent

== Geography ==
Formed by the confluence of the Narcissus and Cuvier rivers within Lake St Clair, the Derwent flows generally southeast over a distance of 187 kilometres (116 mi) to New Norfolk and the estuary portion extends a further 52 kilometres (32 mi) out to the Tasman Sea. Flows average in range from 50 to 140 cubic metres per second (1,800 to 4,900 cu ft/s) and the mean annual flow is 90 cubic metres per second (3,200 cu ft/s).

The large estuary forms the Port of the City of Hobart – the deepest sheltered harbour in the Southern Hemisphere. Some past guests of the port include HMS Beagle in February 1836, carrying Charles Darwin; the USS Enterprise; USS John C. Stennis and USS Missouri. The largest vessel to ever travel the Derwent is the 113,000-tonne (111,000-long-ton), 61-metre (200 ft) high, ocean liner Diamond Princess, which made her first visit in January 2006.

At points in its lower reaches the river is nearly 3 kilometres (1.9 mi) wide, and as such is the widest river in Tasmania.

The Derwent estuary contains dozens of white sandy beaches, many of which are staples of local activity within Hobart suburbs and include Bellerive Beach, Blackmans Bay Beach, Howrah Beach, Nutgrove Beach, Lords Beach, Long Beach, Taroona Beach, Hinsby Beach, Kingston Beach and Windermere Beach.

=== Hydro schemes ===
Until the construction of several dams between 1934 and 1968, the river was prone to flooding. Now there are more than twenty dams and reservoirs used for the generation of hydroelectricity on the Derwent and its tributaries, including the Clyde, Dee, Jordan, Nive, Ouse, Plenty and Styx rivers. Seven lakes have been formed by damming the Derwent and the Nive rivers for hydroelectric purposes and include the Meadowbank, Cluny, Repulse, Catagunya, Wayatinah, Liapootah and King William lakes or lagoons.

=== River health ===
The Upper Derwent is affected by agricultural run-off, particularly from land clearing and forestry. The Lower Derwent suffers from high levels of toxic heavy metal contamination in sediments. The Tasmanian Government-backed Derwent Estuary Program has commented that the levels of mercury, lead, zinc and cadmium in the river exceed national guidelines. In 2015 the program recommended against consuming shellfish and cautioned against consuming fish in general. Nutrient levels in the Derwent between 2010 and 2015 increased in the upper estuary (between Bridgewater and New Norfolk) where there had been algal blooms.

==== Industrial pollution ====
A large proportion of toxic heavy metal contamination stems from legacy pollution caused by major industries that discharge into the river including the Risdon Zinc Works, a historic smelter establish at Lutana in 1916, and the Boyer Mill at Boyer which opened in 1941.

The Derwent adjoins or flows through the Pittwater–Orielton Lagoon, Interlaken Lakeside Reserve and Goulds Lagoon, all wetlands of significance protected under the Ramsar Convention.

== Flora and fauna ==
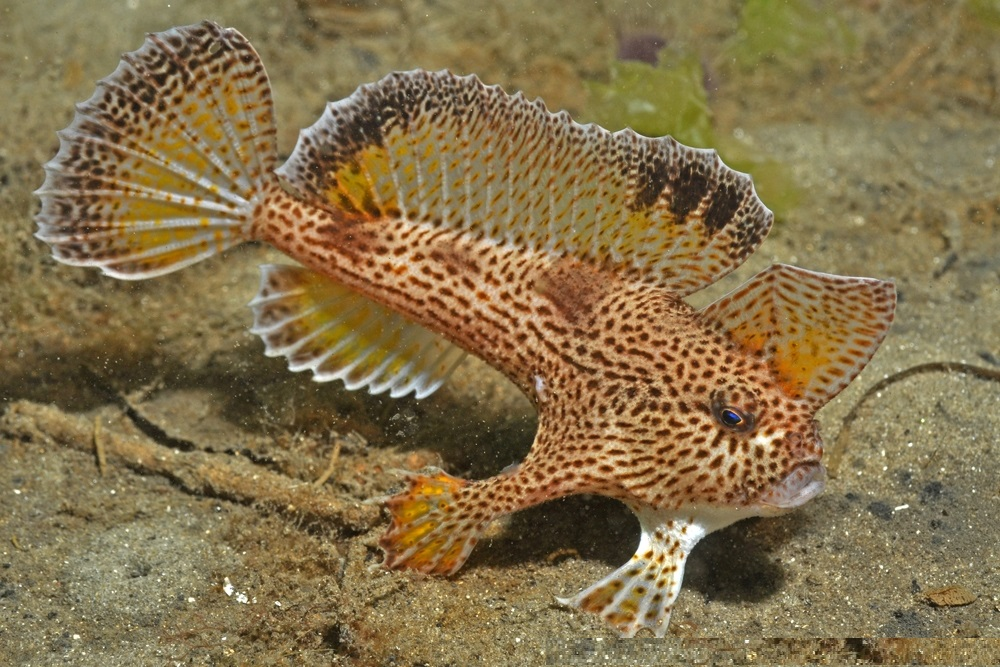
The critically endangered spotted handfish

In recent years, southern right whales finally started making appearance in the river during months in winter and spring when their migration takes place. Some females even started using calm waters of the river as a safe ground for giving birth to their calves and would stay over following weeks after disappearance of almost 200 years due to being wiped out by intense whaling activities. In the winter months of 2014, humpback whales and a minke whale (being the first confirmed record of this species in the river) have been recorded feeding in the River Derwent for the first time since the whaling days of the 1800s.

The rare spotted handfish (Brachionichthys hirsutus), whose only habitat is in the Derwent estuary and surrounds, was the first marine fish to be listed as critically endangered in the IUCN Red List, in 1996. The fish is threatened by the Northern Pacific seastar's invasion into southern Australian waters. The Northern Pacific seastar (Asterias amurensis), now firmly established in the Derwent, preys on not only the fish eggs, but also on the sea squirts (ascidians) that help to form the substrate that the fish spawn on.

== Bridges ==
Several bridges connect the western shore (the more heavily populated side of the river) to the eastern shore of Hobart – in the greater Hobart area, these include the five lane Tasman Bridge, near the CBD, just north of the port; the four lane Bowen Bridge; and the four lane Bridgewater Bridge. Until 1964 the Derwent was crossed by the unique Hobart Bridge, a floating concrete structure just upstream from where the Tasman Bridge now stands.

Travelling further north from the Bridgewater crossing, the next crossing point is the Blair Street Bridge at New Norfolk, slightly north of the point where the Derwent reverts from seawater to fresh water, Bushy Park, Upper Meadowbank Lake, Lake Repulse Road, Wayatinah, and the most northerly crossing is at Derwent Bridge, before the river reaches its source of Lake St Clair. At the Derwent Bridge crossing, the flow of the river is generally narrow enough to be stepped across.

== Cultural references ==
The river is the subject of the multimedia performance "Falling Mountain" (2005 Mountain Festival), a reference to the mountain in the Cradle Mountain-Lake St Clair National Park from which the river rises.

The Derwent is mentioned in the song, Mt Wellington Reverie by Australian band, Augie March. Hobart is located in the foothills of Mount Wellington.

== Panoramas ==
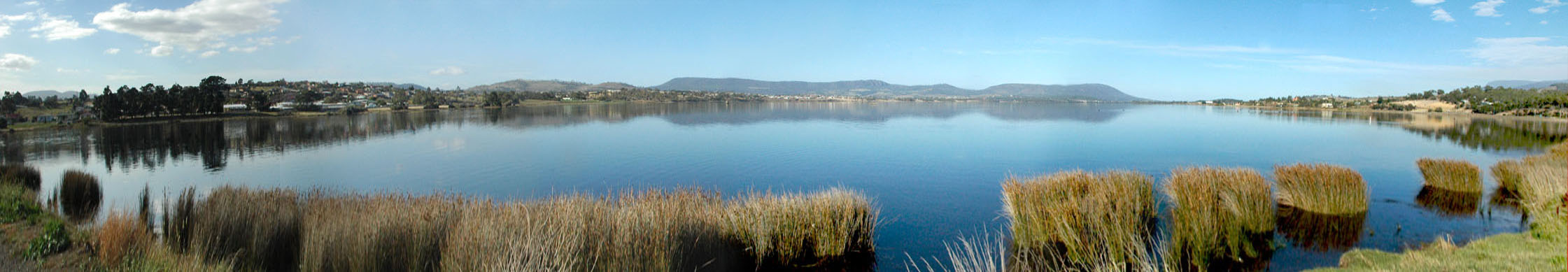
The River Derwent (facing south), at the Bridgewater causeway
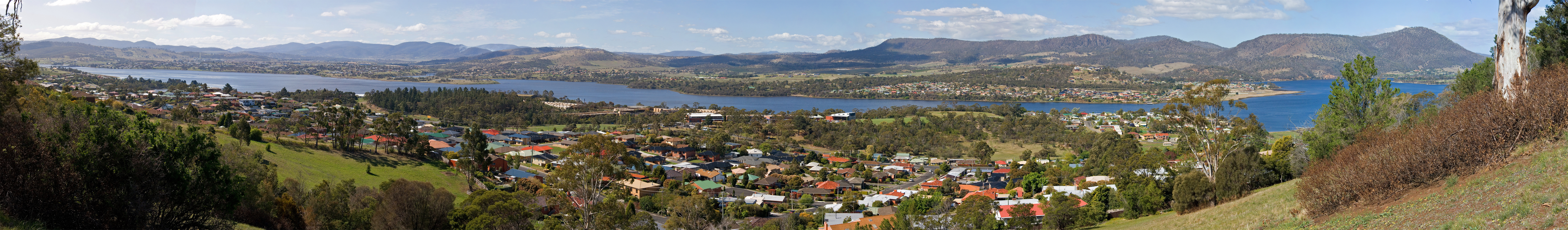
The River Derwent as seen from Poimenna Reserve, Austins Ferry

== See also ==
- Bridgewater Jerry
- Ferries in Hobart
- Hydro Tasmania
- List of rivers of Tasmania
- Whaling in Australia
- List of deepest natural harbours
