= Ooperipatellus mathinnae =

Scientific classification
- Kingdom: Animalia
- Phylum: Onychophora
- Family: Peripatopsidae
- Genus: Ooperipatellus
- Species: O. mathinnae

Binomial name
- Ooperipatellus mathinnae Lord & Giribet, 2026

Species of egg-laying Peripatopsid velvet worm

Ooperipatellus mathinnae is a species of velvet worm in the family Peripatopsidae. Like all velvet worms in the genus Ooperipatellus, this species is oviparous, and like most species in this genus, this velvet worm features 14 pairs of legs. This velvet worm is found in the state of Tasmania in Australia.

== Discovery ==
This species was first described in 2026 by Arianna Lord, Shahan Derkarabetian, Shoyo Sato, and Gonzalo Giribet, biologists at the Museum of Comparative Zoology at Harvard University. They based this description on eight specimens, including a male holotype, four male paratypes, and one female paratype. The authors collected all six type specimens on the island of Tasmania in 2023. The holotype, the female paratype, and one male paratype were found at an elevation of 318 meters at Mathinna Falls, near the town of Mathinna. All six type specimens are deposited in the Museum of Comparative Zoology.

== Phylogeny ==
A phylogenetic analysis of the genus Ooperipatellus based on molecular data places O. mathinnae in a clade with a sister group formed by three Tasmanian species in the same genus, O. cynocephalus, O. notus, and O. spenceri. Three other species of Ooperipatellus (O. cryptus and O. decoratus, both from Tasmania, and O. insignis, from the Australian mainland) form this clade's sister group on a separate branch of a phylogenetic tree of this genus. This evidence indicates that O. mathinnae is more closely related to O. cynocephalus, O. notus, and O. spenceri than to the other species of Ooperipatellus in this analysis.

== Description ==
The species O. mathinnae features 14 leg pairs in each sex, with the last leg pair somewhat reduced but not rotated. Preserved female specimens can reach 10 mm in length, and preserved male specimens can reach 9.5 mm in length. The dorsal surface of the body features about 10 to 12 plicae (transverse ridges) per segment, with areas of incomplete plicae. Each foot features three complete spinous pads, and most feet also feature a fragmented fourth pad proximal to the others. On the fourth and fifth leg pairs, a nephridial tubercle divides the third pad into two parts. The distal end of each foot features paired claws and three distal papillae, but basal papillae are absent. The male of this species features crural papillae on leg pairs 6 through 13. The male gonopore appears between the last leg pair and is cruciform. Females feature a large ovipositor pointed toward the rear, with a gonopore in the form of a longitudinal slit at the distal end. The anus is located at the terminal end of the body.

The dorsal surface is dark in most specimens, including the holotype, but is instead a lighter brown-orange with dark markings in one paratype. The dorsal surface of the dark specimens displays a distinctive pattern of primary papillae, featuring not only abundant orange papillae but also a few bright papillae that are often blue but can also be pale yellow. A pair of these bright papillae appear on the back of each segment, one papilla on each side. These bright papillae also appear above or slightly anterior to each leg, two papillae on each side, each papilla on a separate plica. A dark line runs down the middle of the back in both the orange specimen and the dark specimens. The spinous pads match the pigment on the dorsal surface. The male genital pad is orange or nearly white.

== Distribution ==
Type specimens were collected not only from the type locality (Mathinna Falls) but also from other sites in northeastern Tasmania. For example, one paratype was collected at an elevation of 462 meters at Weldborough Pass, near the town of Weldborough. Two more specimens were collected from localities further north: one at the Stony Head military training area and another on Flinders Island. Specimens collected from each of these northeastern sites were identified as O. mathinnae based on molecular data. Other velvet worms on the iNaturalist website, however, display the pattern of bright papillae considered diagnostic for this species, including velvet worms observed in Southwest National Park and in Mount Field National Park. These community sightings suggest a broader range for this species in Tasmania.

== Etymology ==
The species name not only alludes to the type locality (Mathinna Falls) but also honors Mathinna, an Aboriginal girl born around 1835 at the Wybalenna Aboriginal Establishment. The British colonial government built this internment facility on Flinders Island to hold Aboriginal people forced into exile from the island of Tasmania. The colonial government took Mathinna from her family on Flinders Island and sent her to live in Hobart with a British couple, Sir John Franklin and Lady Jane Franklin, who abandoned her four years later, leaving her in an orphan asylum.
