= Ooperipatellus cynocephalus =

Scientific classification
- Kingdom: Animalia
- Phylum: Onychophora
- Family: Peripatopsidae
- Genus: Ooperipatellus
- Species: O. cynocephalus

Binomial name
- Ooperipatellus cynocephalus Lord & Giribet, 2026

Species of egg-laying Peripatopsid velvet worm

Ooperipatellus cynocephalus is a species of velvet worm in the family Peripatopsidae. Like all velvet worms in the genus Ooperipatellus, this species is oviparous, and like most species in this genus, this velvet worm features 14 pairs of legs. This velvet worm is found on the island of Tasmania in Australia.

== Discovery ==
This species was first described in 2026 by Arianna Lord, Shahan Derkarabetian, Shoyo Sato, and Gonzalo Giribet, biologists at the Museum of Comparative Zoology at Harvard University, based on two female specimens collected at different sites in Tasmania in 2023. The authors found the holotype at an elevation of 264 meters in the Dial Range Reserve and the paratype at an elevation of 311 meters at Nelson Falls. Both type specimens are deposited in the Museum of Comparative Zoology.

== Distribution ==
Both specimens of this velvet worm were found in northwestern Tasmania. Authorities suspect that the range of this species is confined to this quadrant of the island. This range overlaps with the ranges of two other species in the same genus, O. cryptus and O. decoratus.

== Description ==
This species features 14 leg pairs, with the last leg pair well developed and used for walking. Preserved specimens can reach 14 mm in length and 3 mm in width. The dorsal surface of the body usually features 12 plicae (transverse ridges) per segment. Each foot features three complete spinous pads, and most feet also feature a fragmented fourth pad proximal to the others. On the fourth and fifth leg pairs, a nephridial tubercle divides the third pad into two parts. The distal end of each foot features paired claws and three distal papillae. Females feature a large ovipositor pointed toward the rear, with a gonopore in the form of a longitudinal slit at the distal end. The anus is located at the terminal end of the body.

The dorsal surface of this velvet worm displays patterns that vary among specimens. For example, the holotype is brown-orange with a dark longitudinal line on each side above the legs, but the paratype displays an orange pattern on a background that is nearly black. A distinct line runs down the middle of the back in each specimen. The ventral surface of each specimen is pale with a diffuse dark longitudinal line on each side interior to the legs. The spinous pads are dark, and the ovipositor is nearly white.

This species shares an extensive set of traits with two other species in the same genus, O. cryptus and O. decoratus, which are both found in the same quadrant of Tasmania as O. cynocephalus. For example, like all Ooperipatellus species, each of these three velvet worms features feet with three distal papillae and lays eggs using an ovipositor with a longitudinal slit as the gonopore. Furthermore, each of these three species features 14 leg pairs with the last pair fully developed.

The species O. cynocephalus can be distinguished from O. cryptus and O. decoratus, however, based on other features. For example, the dorsal surface is pale in O. cryptus but features dark pigment in O. cynocephalus. Similarly, this surface distinguishes O. decoratus from O. cynocephalus: A distinctive pattern formed by pairs of large primary papillae on each segment appears on the dorsal surface of O. decoratus, but these conspicuous papillae are absent in O. cynocephalus.

== Phylogeny ==
A phylogenetic analysis of the genus Ooperipatellus based on molecular data places O. cynocephalus in a clade with a sister group formed by two more Tasmanian species in the same genus, O. notus and O. spenceri. These three species form a sister group for a fourth Tasmanian species, O. mathinnae. This phylogenetic tree indicates that these four species are more closely related to one another than to the other species of Ooperipatellus in this analysis.

== Etymology ==
The velvet worm O. cynocephalus takes its species name from the extinct Tasmanian tiger, Thylacinus cynocephalus. The species name of O. cynocephalus refers to the pattern observed on the dorsal surface of the holotype specimen, which features black stripes on an orange background. This pattern is reminiscent of the stripes of the Asian tiger or the Tasmanian tiger.
