= Ooperipatellus spenceri =

Scientific classification
- Kingdom: Animalia
- Phylum: Onychophora
- Family: Peripatopsidae
- Genus: Ooperipatellus
- Species: O. spenceri

Binomial name
- Ooperipatellus spenceri (Cockerell, 1913)

Species of egg-laying Peripatopsid velvet worm

Ooperipatellus spenceri is a species of velvet worm in the family Peripatopsidae. Like all velvet worms in the genus Ooperipatellus, this species is oviparous, and like most species in this genus, this velvet worm features 14 pairs of legs. This velvet worm was the first species in this genus to be described from Tasmania in Australia.

== Discovery, taxonomy, and phylogeny ==
This velvet worm was first described briefly by the biologist W. Baldwin Spencer in a note written in 1894 but published in 1895. He based his description on fifteen specimens, which he found in 1893 under fallen logs in the rural locality of Dee in the Central Highlands area southeast of Lake St Clare in Tasmania. He assigned these specimens to the species Peripatus insignis, a similar velvet worm discovered earlier in the state of Victoria on the Australian mainland. Similarly, after proposing the genus Ooperipatus in 1900 to contain all oviparous velvet worms, the English zoologist Arthur Dendy assigned the Tasmanian specimens described by Spencer to Ooperipatus insignis.

In 1907, the French zoologist Eugène Louis Bouvier described this Tasmanian velvet worm in more detail as a species distinct from the mainland species but nevertheless applied the name Ooperipatus insignis to the Tasmanian species. In 1913, in a footnote in an article by the American zoologist Austin Hobart Clark, the American biologist Theodore D.A. Cockerell proposed the name Ooperipatus spenceri for this Tasmanian velvet worm as a distinct species. Nevertheless, in 1977, the German zoologist Martin Baehr deemed O. spenceri to be a junior synonym of O. insignis. Similarly, in 1985, the German zoologist Hilke Ruhberg proposed the genus Ooperipatellus to include a subset of the oviparous velvet worms, including O. insignis, but she also assigned the Tasmanian specimens described by Spencer and Bouvier to O. insignis.

Authorities now recognize O. spenceri and O. insignis as distinct species, noting the significant distance between the type localities of these two species and their separation by the Bass Strait. In 2026, the zoologists Arianna Lord, Shahan Derkarabetian, Shoyo Sato, and Gonzalo Giribet conducted a phylogenetic analysis of the genus Ooperipatellus based on molecular data, which placed O. spenceri and O. insignis on separate branches of a phylogenetic tree of the genus Ooperipatellus and confirmed their status as distinct species. This analysis places O. spenceri in a in a clade with another Tasmanian species in the same genus, O. notus, with these two closely related species forming a sister group for a third Tasmanian species, O. cynocephalus. These three species form a sister group for a fourth Tasmanian species, O. mathinnae, indicating that these four are more closely related to one another than to a separate clade containing not only two other Tasmanian species (O. cryptus and O. decoratus) but also the mainland species O. insignis. This 2026 analysis also indicated that another nominal species in the same genus, O. nickmayeri, is a junior synonym of O. spenceri. Other references, however, list O. nickmayeri as a valid species.

== Description ==
Adults in this species can range from 9 mm to 23 mm in length and from 1 mm to 4 mm in width, with the males generally smaller than the females. Including specimens previously assigned to O. nickmayeri, the species O. spenceri can also feature females exceeding 60 mm in length and males exceeding 30 mm in length. The jaw features two blades, an inner blade and an outer blade. The inner blade features one large tooth, four to seven smaller accessory teeth, and no diastema. The outer blade features only one large tooth with no accessory teeth. This velvet worm features 14 pairs of legs. The dorsal surface of the body features 12 complete plicae (transverse ridges) per segment. Each foot features three spinous pads and three distal papillae, but no basal papillae. The male of this species features crural papillae on leg pairs 6 through 13. The female features an ovipositor as large as the legs of the last leg pair.

This species varies widely in color, ranging from dark purplish black specimens with only faint traces of a pattern to others with more orange-red, a dark line down the middle, and marked patterns. The ventral surface of the body and the inner surfaces of the legs are pale, but the ventral surface can feature two broad dark longitudinal stripes in some specimens. The antennae are brownish but blue at the distal ends and can feature orange rings. The eyes are white or a pale blue.

This species shares an extensive set of traits with its closest relative, O. notus. For example, like all Ooperipatellus species, both O. spenceri and O. notus lay eggs and feature feet with three distal papillae, but no basal papillae. Furthermore, both species feature 14 leg pairs, males of each species feature crural papillae on leg pairs 6 through 13, and the antennal rings can feature orange in each species.

These two close relatives can be distinguished, however, based on other traits. For example, the lower flank displays a distinctive pattern of one or two blue primary papillae per plica forming a continuous band above the legs in O. notus but not in O. spenceri. Furthermore, both the dorsal and ventral surfaces of O. notus are dark, whereas the ventral surface of O. spenceri is pale.

== Distribution and habitat ==
The species O. spenceri is known only from Tasmania. This velvet worm has the broadest distribution of any Tasmanian species of Ooperipatellus, found in many localities in central and eastern Tasmania, from near Lake St Clair in the Central Highlands to the East Coast, a broad range that includes Mount Wellington, the Midlands, and the Tasman Peninsula. For example, specimens of O. spenceri held by the Museum of Comparative Zoology at Harvard University were found not only on Mount Wellington at elevations of 615 and 629 meters, but also along the Lyell Highway in the Central Highlands between Wayatinah and Tarraleah at an elevation of 595 meters, near Blessington at an elevation of 366 meters, and among leaf litter, woody debris, and rock piles in a mixed forest near Lake Leake at an elevation of 530 meters. This species can be found in rotten wood in humid Eucalyptus forests and temperate rainforests with Nothofagus.
