= Anthocephalum papefayei =

Scientific classification
- Kingdom: Animalia
- Phylum: Platyhelminthes
- Class: Cestoda
- Order: Rhinebothriidea
- Family: Rhinobothriidae
- Genus: Anthocephalum
- Species: A. papefayei

Binomial name
- Anthocephalum papefayei Ruhnke, Caira & Cox, 2015

Species of flatworm

Anthocephalum papefayei is a species of flatworms. It can be differentiated by its overall size, the number of proglottids and marginal loculi, the number and arrangement of its testes, the size of its apical sucker, the arrangement and distribution of vitelline follicles, and the "muscularity" of its genital pore.
