= Anthocephalum decrisantisorum =

Scientific classification
- Kingdom: Animalia
- Phylum: Platyhelminthes
- Class: Cestoda
- Order: Rhinebothriidea
- Family: Rhinobothriidae
- Genus: Anthocephalum
- Species: A. decrisantisorum

Binomial name
- Anthocephalum decrisantisorum Ruhnke, Caira & Cox, 2015

Species of flatworm

Anthocephalum decrisantisorum is a species of flatworms. It can be differentiated by its overall size, the number of proglottids and marginal loculi, the number and arrangement of its testes, the size of its apical sucker, the arrangement and distribution of vitelline follicles, and the "muscularity" of its genital pore.
