= Anthocephalum odonnellae =

Scientific classification
- Kingdom: Animalia
- Phylum: Platyhelminthes
- Class: Cestoda
- Order: Rhinebothriidea
- Family: Rhinobothriidae
- Genus: Anthocephalum
- Species: A. odonnellae

Binomial name
- Anthocephalum odonnellae Ruhnke, Caira & Cox, 2015

Species of flatworm

Anthocephalum odonnellae is a species of flatworm. It can be differentiated by its overall size, the number of proglottids and marginal loculi, the number and arrangement of its testes, the size of its apical sucker, the arrangement and distribution of vitelline follicles, and the "muscularity" of its genital pore.
