= Ooperipatellus parvus =

Scientific classification
- Kingdom: Animalia
- Phylum: Onychophora
- Family: Peripatopsidae
- Genus: Ooperipatellus
- Species: O. parvus

Binomial name
- Ooperipatellus parvus Reid, 1996

Species of egg-laying Peripatopsid velvet worm

Ooperipatellus parvus is a species of velvet worm in the family Peripatopsidae. Like all velvet worms in the genus Ooperipatellus, this species is oviparous, and like most species in this genus, this velvet worm features 14 pairs of legs. This velvet worm is found in Australia and is the only described species in this genus found in the state of South Australia.

== Discovery ==
This species was first described in 1996 by the Australian zoologist Amanda L. Reid. She based the original description of this species on a male holotype and ten paratypes (five females and five males). She and her colleague Anne Skates collected these specimens at three different sites in South Australia in 1994. They collected the holotype and five paratypes in Mylor by the Onkaparinga River at an elevation of 320 meters in the Mount Lofty Ranges, three more paratypes in Waterfall Gully in Cleland National Park at an elevation of 400 meters, and the other two paratypes in Carey Gully at an elevation of 480 meters in the Mount Lofty Ranges. The holotype and eight paratypes are deposited in the South Australian Museum in Adelaide, and the other two paratypes are deposited in the Australian Museum in Sydney.

== Description ==
The dorsal surface and antennae of this species are grayish blue, and the ventral pigment can be present, pale, or absent. Each antenna features 30 complete rings with alternating wider and narrower rings. The antennae can feature tan bands on alternate rings starting with the fifth ring from the base. The proximal rings expand on the ventral side to form sensory pads with two or three rows of bristles. The jaw features two blades, an inner blade with no diastema as well as an outer blade with no accessory teeth.

This species features 14 pairs of legs with the last pair fully developed. The dorsal surface features 13 complete plicae (transverse ridges) between adjacent leg pairs. Each foot features thee spinous pads and three distal papillae (one anterior, one median, and one posterior), but no basal papillae. Crural glands extend from the legs into the body cavity from leg pair 6 through leg pair 13 in the male of this species, but the legs show no trace of crural papillae. The male gonopore is cruciform, with all four arms of the cross equal in length. The female features an ovipositor between the last pair of legs with a longitudinal slit as the gonopore.

This species exhibits many of the traits that characterize the genus Ooperipatellus. For example, this species is oviparous, the ovipositor between the last pair of legs of the female features a longitudinal slit as the gonopore, and the male gonopore is cruciform. Furthermore, accessory teeth are absent from the outer jaw blade, and each foot features three distal papillae (one anterior, one median, and one posterior), but no basal papillae.

This species shares an especially extensive set of traits with another species in the same genus, O. duwilensis, which is found in the adjacent state of Victoria in Australia. For example, each of these species features an inner jaw blade with no diastema, 14 leg pairs with the last pair fully developed, three spinous pads on each foot, and a male gonopore shaped like a cross with four arms of equal length. Furthermore, each antenna in both species features 30 complete rings with alternating wider and narrower rings, and the sensory pads on these antennae feature two or three rows of bristles.

These two species can be distinguished, however, based on other traits. For example, crural glands extend into the body cavity only from leg pair 13 in O. duwilensis, whereas these glands extend into the body cavity from more leg pairs in O. parvus. Furthermore, crural papillae are visible on the ventral surface of the legs from leg pair 9 or 10 through leg pair 13 in O. duwilensis, but these papillae are not visible in O. parvus. Moreover, the dorsal surface between adjacent leg pairs features 13 complete plicae in O. parvus but only 12 complete plicae in O. duwilensis.

== Distribution and habitat ==
The species O. parvus is found in decaying logs. This velvet worm has a narrow range: This species is found only in South Australia, where this range extends from Waterfall Gully in Cleland National Park to Mylor in the Mount Lofty Ranges.
