= Anthocephalum =

Scientific classification
- Kingdom: Animalia
- Phylum: Platyhelminthes
- Class: Cestoda
- Order: Rhinebothriidea
- Family: Rhinobothriidae
- Genus: Anthocephalum; Linton, 1890

Genus of flatworms

Anthocephalum is a genus of flatworms belonging to the family Rhinobothriidae.

The genus has almost cosmopolitan distribution.

Species:

- Anthocephalum alicae Ruhnke, 1994
- Anthocephalum blairi Herzog & Jensen, 2018
- Anthocephalum cairae Ruhnke, 1994
- Anthocephalum centrurum (Southwell, 1925) Ruhnke, 1994
- Anthocephalum currani Ruhnke & Seaman, 2009
- Anthocephalum decrisantisorum Ruhkne, Caira & Cox, 2015
- Anthocephalum decristanisorum Ruhnke, Caira & Cox, 2015
- Anthocephalum duszynskii Ruhnke, 1994
- Anthocephalum gracile (Wedl, 1855) Ruhnke, 1994
- Anthocephalum gravisi Herzog & Jensen, 2018
- Anthocephalum haroldsoni Herzog & Jensen, 2018
- Anthocephalum healyae Ruhnke, Caira & Cox, 2015
- Anthocephalum hobergi (Zamparo, Brooks & Barriga, 1999) Marques & Caira, 2016
- Anthocephalum jeancadenati Boudaya, Neifar & Euzet, 2018
- Anthocephalum jensenae Ruhnke, Caira & Cox, 2015
- Anthocephalum kingae (Schmidt, 1978) Ruhnke & Seaman, 2009
- Anthocephalum lukei Ruhnke & Seaman, 2009
- Anthocephalum mattisi Ruhnke, Caira & Cox, 2015
- Anthocephalum meadowsi Ruhnke, Caira & Cox, 2015
- Anthocephalum michaeli Ruhnke & Seaman, 2009
- Anthocephalum mounseyi Herzog & Jensen, 2018
- Anthocephalum odonnellae Ruhnke, Caira & Cox, 2015
- Anthocephalum papefayei Ruhnke, Caira & Cox, 2015
- Anthocephalum philruschi Ruhnke, Caira & Cox, 2015
- Anthocephalum ruhnkei Herzog & Jensen, 2018
- Anthocephalum wedli Ruhnke, 2011
