= Ooperipatellus nickmayeri =

Scientific classification
- Kingdom: Animalia
- Phylum: Onychophora
- Family: Peripatopsidae
- Genus: Ooperipatellus
- Species: O. nickmayeri

Binomial name
- Ooperipatellus nickmayeri Oliveira & Mayer, 2017

Species of egg-laying Peripatopsid velvet worm

Ooperipatellus nickmayeri is a species of oviparous velvet worm in the family Peripatopsidae. This species is larger than any other in the genus Ooperipatellus. With a body size exceeding 60 mm in females and 30 mm in males, these velvet worms can be more than twice as long as other species of this genus.

== Discovery ==
This species was first described by the biologists Ivo de Sena Oliveira and Georg Mayer in 2017 based on ten specimens, including a male holotype, three female paratypes, and six other specimens (five females and one male). These specimens were collected from rotting logs and leaf litter in a small fragment of forest at an elevation of 545 meters near the Lyell Highway between Tarraleah and Wayatinah in the Central Highlands region of Tasmania. The authors of the original description named this species for the six-year old son (Nick Mayer) of one of the authors, who suggested a stop along the road during which the authors discovered this species in 2013. The holotype is deposited in the Queen Victoria Museum and Art Gallery in Launceston, Tasmania.

== Taxonomy ==
In 2026, the zoologists Arianna Lord, Shahan Derkarabetian, Shoyo Sato, and Gonzalo Giribet conducted a phylogenetic analysis of the Tasmanian species of Ooperipatellus based on molecular data. This analysis indicates that O. nickmayeri is a junior synonym of another species in the same genus, O. spenceri. Other references, however, list O. nickmayeri as a valid species.

== Description ==
These velvet worms have 14 pairs of legs in both sexes, with the last pair reduced in size but used for walking. Each foot features three complete spinous pads, with the first and third pads smaller than the second. Most legs also feature a fourth fragmented pad. The nephridial tubercle on the fourth and fifth leg pairs is located in the third pad, dividing the pad into two unequal parts. Each foot features paired claws and three distal foot papillae (one anterior, one medial, and one posterior). The males of this species feature crural tubercles on leg pairs 6 through 13. These tubercles are smooth at the base, with no scales, but feature cone-shaped tips with tiny scales.

These velvet worms vary in color from blue to predominantly orange-brown, with a light blue ventral surface. Each antenna features 30 to 32 rings, with tan or orange bands on every fourth ring starting with the 15th most distal ring and ending with ring 27 or 31. The slime papillae are also tan or orange. A furrow runs down the middle of the back. The dorsal integument features dermal papillae arranged into 12 complete plicae (transverse ridges) per segment. The gonopore in the male is cruciform, with the transverse slit longer than the longitudinal slit. The ovipositor in the females is large and conspicuous, with a genital opening in the form of a longitudinal slit at the distal end. The anus is located at the terminal end of the body in both sexes. The males of this species feature a pair of anal gland openings in front of the anus. The spinous pads, the crural tubercles and the genital pad in males, and the ovipositor in females are all whitish or light orange.

Notwithstanding the large body size, which distinguishes this species from others in the same genus, this species exhibits many of the traits that characterize this genus. These features include oviparous reproduction, 14 leg pairs in each sex, females with a well-developed ovipositor, males with a cruciform gonopore, and the absence of any modified head papillae or head organ. Phylogenetic analysis based on molecular data confirms the placement of this species in the genus Ooperipatellus.

This species also exhibits a set of features aside from its large size that distinguish these velvet worms from other species in this genus. These features include a distinctive color pattern, including the sequence of bands on the antennae, the number of plicae per segment, and the form and number of the crural tubercles in males. Furthermore, karyological analysis reveals a distinct karyotype for this species, with a heteromorphic pair of sex chromosomes (XY) and the greatest number of chromosomes (2n = 50 XY) reported to date for a species in the family Peripatopsidae.
