= Ooperipatellus notus =

Scientific classification
- Kingdom: Animalia
- Phylum: Onychophora
- Family: Peripatopsidae
- Genus: Ooperipatellus
- Species: O. notus

Binomial name
- Ooperipatellus notus Lord & Giribet, 2026

Species of egg-laying Peripatopsid velvet worm

Ooperipatellus notus is a species of velvet worm in the family Peripatopsidae. Like all velvet worms in the genus Ooperipatellus, this species is oviparous, and like most species in this genus, this velvet worm features 14 pairs of legs. This velvet worm is found on the island of Tasmania in Australia.

== Discovery ==
This species was first described in 2026 by Arianna Lord, Shahan Derkarabetian, Shoyo Sato, and Gonzalo Giribet, biologists at the Museum of Comparative Zoology at Harvard University. They based their description on six specimens, including three males and two females. The authors collected the holotype and a paratype, both males, at an elevation of 442 meters near the town of Orford in southern Tasmania in 2023. Both type specimens are deposited in the Museum of Comparative Zoology.

== Phylogeny ==
A phylogenetic analysis of the genus Ooperipatellus based on molecular data places O. notus in a clade with another Tasmanian species in the same genus, O. spenceri. Each of these species emerges as the other's closest relative in this analysis. These two species form a sister group for a third Tasmanian species, O. cynocephalus, which emerges as the next closest relative. These three species form a sister group for a fourth Tasmanian species, O. mathinnae, indicating that these four are more closely related to one another than to the other species of Ooperipatellus in this analysis.

== Distribution and etymology ==
The species O. notus is found only in southern Tasmania. The species name refers to Notus, the Greek god of the south wind, alluding to the distribution of this velvet worm in southern Tasmania, which is subject to winds from the Southern Ocean. Specimens of O. notus have been collected not only from the type locality near Orford but also at four other sites to the west and further south. For example, the third male specimen was found at Cox Bight, and a female specimen was found at a site northeast of the Tahune Forest Reserve. The ranges of O. notus and its close relative O. spenceri overlap in southeast Tasmania.

== Description ==
This species features 14 leg pairs in each sex, and preserved specimens can reach 12 mm in length. The last leg pair is well developed and used for walking. The dorsal surface of the body features about 10 to 12 plicae (transverse ridges) per segment, with areas of incomplete plicae. Each foot features three complete spinous pads, and most feet also feature a fragmented fourth pad proximal to the others. On the fourth and fifth leg pairs, a nephridial tubercle splits the third pad into two parts. The distal end of each foot features paired claws and three distal papillae, but basal papillae are absent. The male of this species features crural papillae on leg pairs 6 through 13. The male gonopore appears between the last leg pair and is cruciform, with the transverse slit longer than the longitudinal slit. The anus is located at the terminal end of the body.

This velvet worm is not only dark on the dorsal surface but also equally dark on the ventral surface. The lower flank of live specimens displays a distinctive pattern of one or two blue primary papillae per plica forming a continuous band above the legs. The spinous pads are white, but darker toward the distal end, and the male genital pad ranges from orange to light yellow. Some large rings on the antennae feature orange.

This species shares an extensive set of traits with its closest relative, O. spenceri. For example, like all Ooperipatellus species, both O. notus and O. spenceri lay eggs and feature feet with three distal papillae, but no basal papillae. Furthermore, both species feature 14 leg pairs, males of each species feature crural papillae on leg pairs 6 through 13, and the antennal rings can feature orange in each species.

These two close relatives can be distinguished, however, based on other traits. For example, the lower flank displays a distinctive pattern of one or two blue primary papillae per plica forming a continuous band above the legs in O. notus but not in O. spenceri. Furthermore, both the dorsal and ventral surfaces of O. notus are dark, whereas the ventral surface of O. spenceri is pale.
