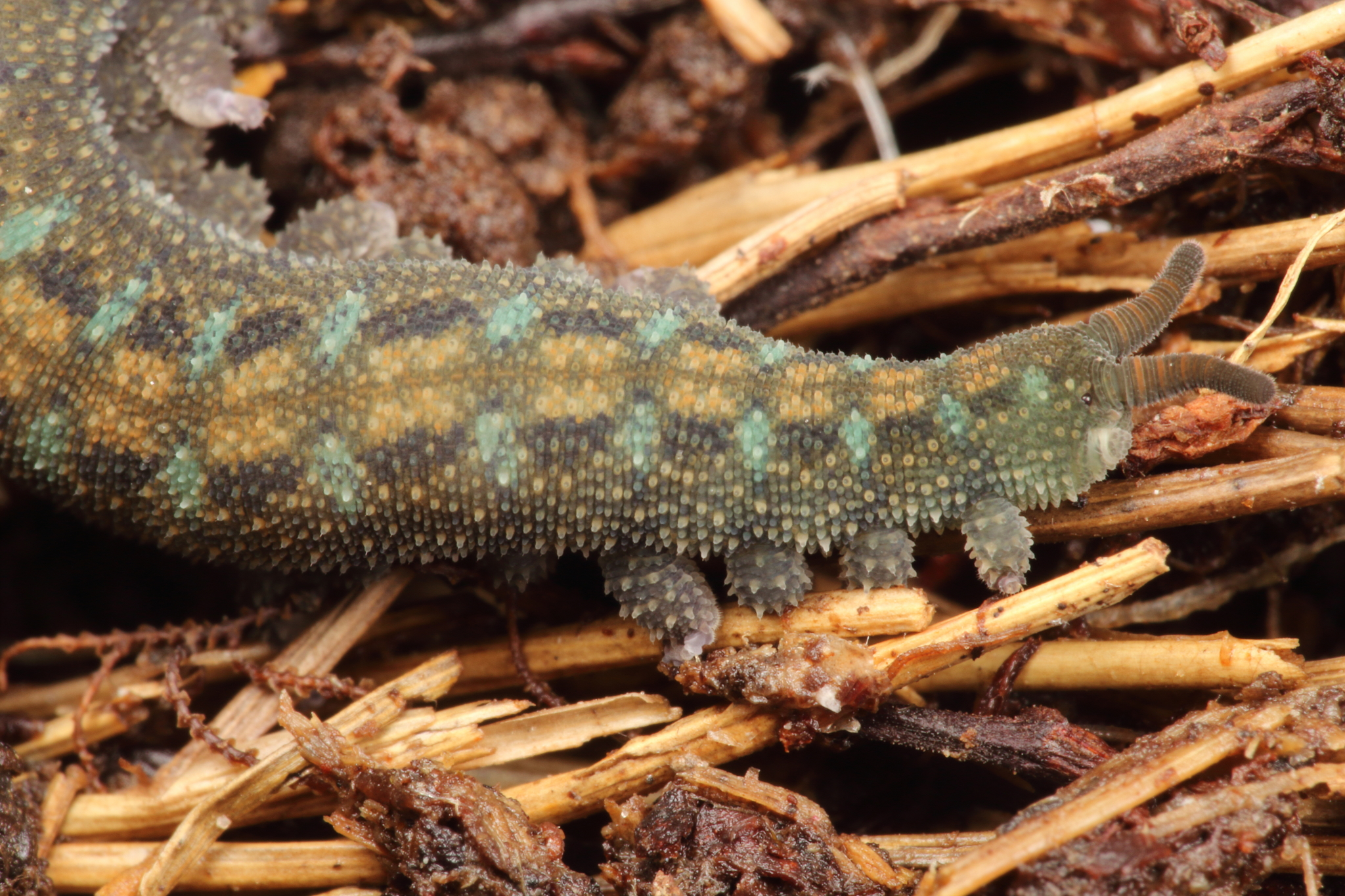

Conservation status
- Not Threatened (NZ TCS)

Scientific classification
- Kingdom: Animalia
- Phylum: Onychophora
- Family: Peripatopsidae
- Genus: Ooperipatellus
- Species: O. viridimaculatus

Binomial name
- Ooperipatellus viridimaculatus (Dendy, 1900)

= Ooperipatellus viridimaculatus =

Species of egg-laying Peripatopsid velvet worm

Ooperipatellus viridimaculatus is a species of velvet worm in the family Peripatopsidae. This velvet worm is found in New Zealand. Like all velvet worms in the genus Ooperipatellus, this species is oviparous, and like most species in this genus, this velvet worm features 14 pairs of legs. The species name refers to the viridian color of the spots that form a distinctive pattern on the back of this velvet worm.

== Discovery ==
This species was first described in 1900 by the English zoologist Arthur Dendy. He described this species after collecting twenty to thirty specimens, but he did not designate a holotype. He discovered this velvet worm in decaying tree trunks in a dense beech forest at the head of Lake Te Anau on the South Island of New Zealand.

== Taxonomy and phylogeny ==
Dendy originally described this species under the name Peripatus viridimaculatus. Later in 1900, he proposed the genus Ooperipatus to contain this species along with all other oviparous velvet worms. In 1985, the German zoologist Hilke Ruhberg proposed the genus Ooperipatellus to include a subset of the oviparous velvet worms, including the velvet worm described by Dendy, but she deemed Ooperipatus viridimaculatus to be a junior synonym of O. insignis, a similar velvet worm in the same genus found in Australia.

Since 1995, studies based on molecular data have found the Ooperipatellus species found on New Zealand to be genetically distinct from the Ooperipatellus species found in Australia. The molecular evidence indicates that O. viridimaculatus is more closely related to O. nanus, the only other described species of Ooperipatellus in New Zealand, than to O. insignis. Authorities now consider O. viridimaculatus and O. insignis to be two distinct species, citing not only the molecular evidence but also the distance between the type localities of these two species (2,113 km), which are separated by the Tasman Sea. The molecular evidence suggests that the New Zealand lineage of Ooperipatellus diverged from the Australian lineage of Ooperipatellus about 75 million years ago, during the Late Cretaceous epoch.

== Description ==
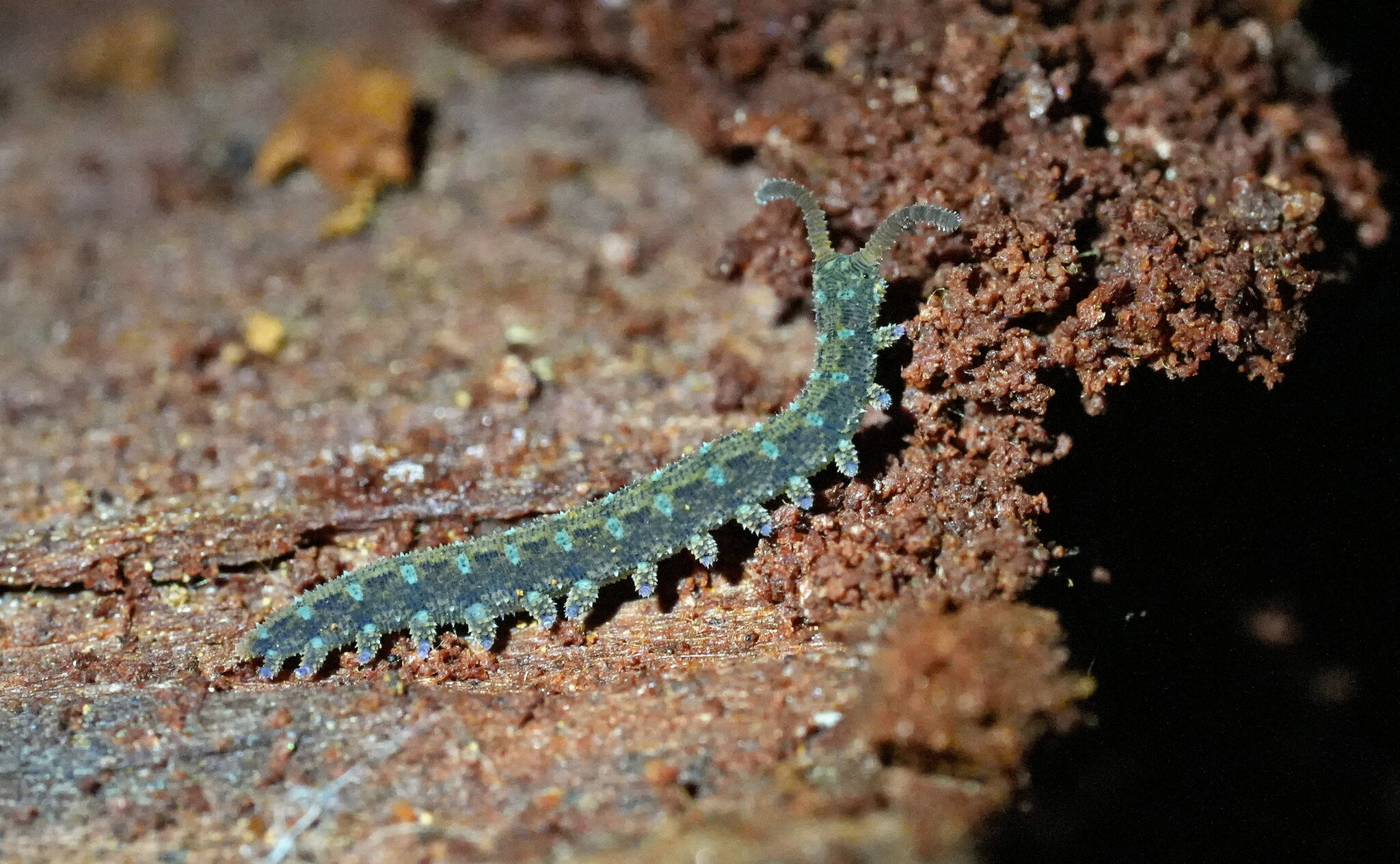
O. viridimaculatus, with 14 pairs of legs behind the oral papillae

The species O. viridimaculatus ranges from 30 mm to 50 mm in length, with the males somewhat smaller than the females. This species is large compared to most species of Ooperipatellus, which usually range between 10 mm and 20 mm in length. The species O. viridimaculatus features 14 pairs of legs, like most species of Ooperipatellus, but unlike O. nanus, which features only 13 leg pairs. The species O. viridimaculatus can be distinguished from its close relative O. nanus based on not only leg number but also size: The species O. nanus is markedly smaller, ranging from 5 mm to about 10 mm in length.

In the species O. viridimaculatus, each foot features three spinous pads, with a narrow proximal pad and a large median pad. The proximal pad may break up transversely and be difficult to discern on the last leg pair. On the fourth and fifth leg pairs, the proximal pad divides transversely into three parts, with a small middle part bearing the nephridial tubercle. Each foot also features three distal papillae (one anterior, one dorsal above the claws, and one posterior). The jaw features two blades, an inner blade with one large tooth and about seven accessory teeth as well as an outer blade without accessory teeth. The female of this species features a long ovipositor between the last pair of legs with a longitudinal slit as the gonopore at the tip.

This species exhibits many of the traits that characterize the genus Ooperipatellus. For example, this species is oviparous, and a prominent ovipositor between the last pair of legs of the female features a longitudinal slit as the gonopore. Furthermore, the inner jaw blade features several accessory teeth, but accessory teeth are absent from the outer jaw blade, and the feet each feature three distal papillae (one anterior, one median, and one posterior).

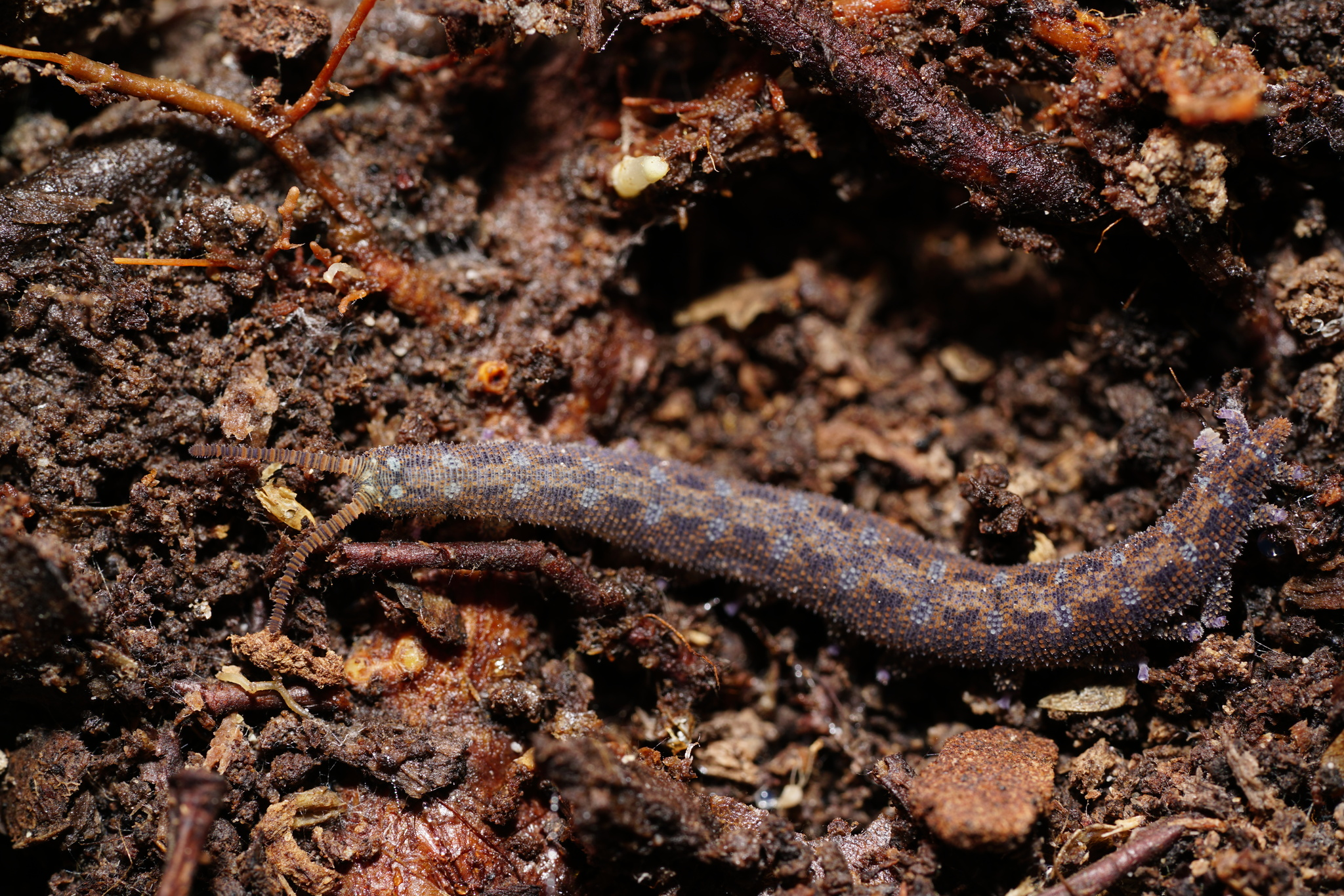
O. viridimaculatus, with two rows of 15 spots alternating with dark triangles down its back

The species O. viridimaculatus can be distinguished from other species in this genus, however, based on the pattern of colors on its body. The most distinctive features of this species are two rows of spots down its back. These spots are arranged in fifteen pairs, one pair above each leg pair and one pair above the oral papillae. These spots range from green to blue. In between adjacent spots on each side is a darker triangle, ranging from black to dark brown, with the apex of each triangle pointing out to the side between the adjacent legs. The background color of the back can be brown or dark gray speckled with orange. The ventral surface is lighter gray or violet with pale areas between the legs, the antennae are typically gray or dark indigo blue with orange rings, and the ovipositor is a light yellow or dull orange. The proximal pad on each foot is orange, whereas the more distal pads and the distal papillae are indigo blue.

Other species of Ooperipatellus display different color patterns and lack the distinctive rows of spots found on O. viridimaculatus. For example, the close relative O. nanus is tan or brown with dark brown bands along each side of its back. The species O. insignis closely resembles O. viridimaculatus but also displays different color patterns. The species O. insignis can range from brownish to a dark indigo blue and displays a striking checkerboard pattern on its back.

== Distribution ==
The species O. viridimaculatus is widely distributed on the western side of the South Island of New Zealand. This velvet worm has been recorded in Buller Gorge, on Mount Misery, and in Victoria Forest Park, for example, as well as at many other localities in the West Coast, Canterbury, and Otago regions of New Zealand. Specimens of this velvet worm have been collected from sites as far as 420 km away from the type locality (Lake Te Anau in the Southland region of New Zealand). Such a broad geographic distribution suggests the possibility of a species complex, which may militate in favor of applying the name O. viridimaculatus only to specimens collected near Lake Te Anau. Molecular evidence suggests that specimens currently assigned to this species probably represent several cryptic species.

== Habitats ==
This species has been recorded at elevations from 300 to 1,650 meters above sea level. This species is found in subalpine beech forests as well as under rocks in the alpine zone. This velvet worm can be found in alpine habitats across most of the alpine zone on the South Island of New Zealand.

== Conservation ==
In 2018, the New Zealand Department of Conservation published a report listing this species as "Not Threatened" under the New Zealand Threat Classification System. This status indicates that this velvet worm has a large and stable population. In 2005, however, a Conservation Resources Report prepared by the Department of Conservation identified trade by international collectors as a threat to this species.
