= Ooperipatellus duwilensis =

Scientific classification
- Kingdom: Animalia
- Phylum: Onychophora
- Family: Peripatopsidae
- Genus: Ooperipatellus
- Species: O. duwilensis

Binomial name
- Ooperipatellus duwilensis Reid, 1996

Species of egg-laying Peripatopsid velvet worm

Ooperipatellus duwilensis is a species of velvet worm in the family Peripatopsidae. This velvet worm is found in the state of Victoria in Australia. Like all velvet worms in the genus Ooperipatellus, this species is oviparous, and like most species in this genus, this velvet worm features 14 pairs of legs.

== Discovery ==
This species was first described in 1996 by the Australian zoologist Amanda L. Reid. She based the original description of this species on a male holotype and eleven paratypes (six females and five males). She and her colleague Anne Skates collected these specimens in 1994 on Mount William in Grampians National Park in Victoria, Australia, at an elevation of 1,256 meters. The species name derives from the aboriginal name (Duwil) for this type locality. The type specimens are deposited in the Melbourne Museum.

== Phylogeny ==
A 1996 study based on morphology places this species in a clade with the only other described species in the same genus found in Victoria, Australia, O. insignis. In this phylogenetic analysis, the species O. insignis emerges as the closest relative of O. duwilensis in a phylogenetic tree. These two species are so similar that specimens of O. duwilensis have been misidentified and assigned to O. insignis.

== Description ==
The dorsal surface of this species can be grayish blue or tan, and the ventral pigment can be present, pale, or absent. The antennae usually have the same color as the dorsal surface and feature no bands. Each antenna in this species features 30 complete rings, with alternating wider and narrower rings. The proximal rings expand on the ventral side to form sensory pads with two or three rows of bristles. The jaw features two blades, an inner blade with no diastema as well as an outer blade with no accessory teeth.

This species features 14 pairs of legs with the last pair fully developed. The dorsal surface features 12 complete plicae (transverse ridges) between adjacent leg pairs. Each foot features thee spinous pads and three distal papillae (one anterior, one median, and one posterior), but no basal papillae. The male of this species features crural papillae on the ventral surface of the legs from leg pair 9 or 10 through leg pair 13. The crural glands of leg pair 13 are long and extend into the body cavity, but the crural glands anterior to leg pair 13 do not extend into the body cavity. The male gonopore is cruciform, with all four arms of the cross equal in length. The female features an ovipositor between the last pair of legs with a longitudinal slit as the gonopore.

This species exhibits many of the traits that characterize the genus Ooperipatellus. For example, this species is oviparous, the ovipositor between the last pair of legs of the female features a longitudinal slit as the gonopore, and the male gonopore is cruciform. Furthermore, accessory teeth are absent from the outer jaw blade, and each foot features three distal papillae (one anterior, one median, and one posterior), but no basal papillae.

This species shares an especially extensive set of traits with its close relative O. insignis. For example, each of these species features 30 complete rings on each antenna, an inner jaw blade with no diastema, 14 leg pairs with the last pair fully developed, 12 complete plicae on the dorsal surface between adjacent leg pairs, three spinous pads on each foot, and a male gonopore shaped like a cross with four arms of equal length. Furthermore, the male of each species features long crural glands extending from leg pair 13 into the body cavity and anterior crural glands that do not extend into the body cavity.

These close relatives can be distinguished, however, based on other traits. For example, the antennae in O. insignis feature tan bands that are absent in O. duwilensis. Furthermore, the male of the species O. insignis features crural papillae on leg pairs 6 through 13, a more extensive set of legs with crural papillae than observed in the species O. duwilensis.

== Distribution and habitat ==
The species O. duwilensis is found in rotten logs. This velvet worm has a narrow distribution: This species is known only from its type locality, Mount William in Grampians National Park in Victoria, Australia.
