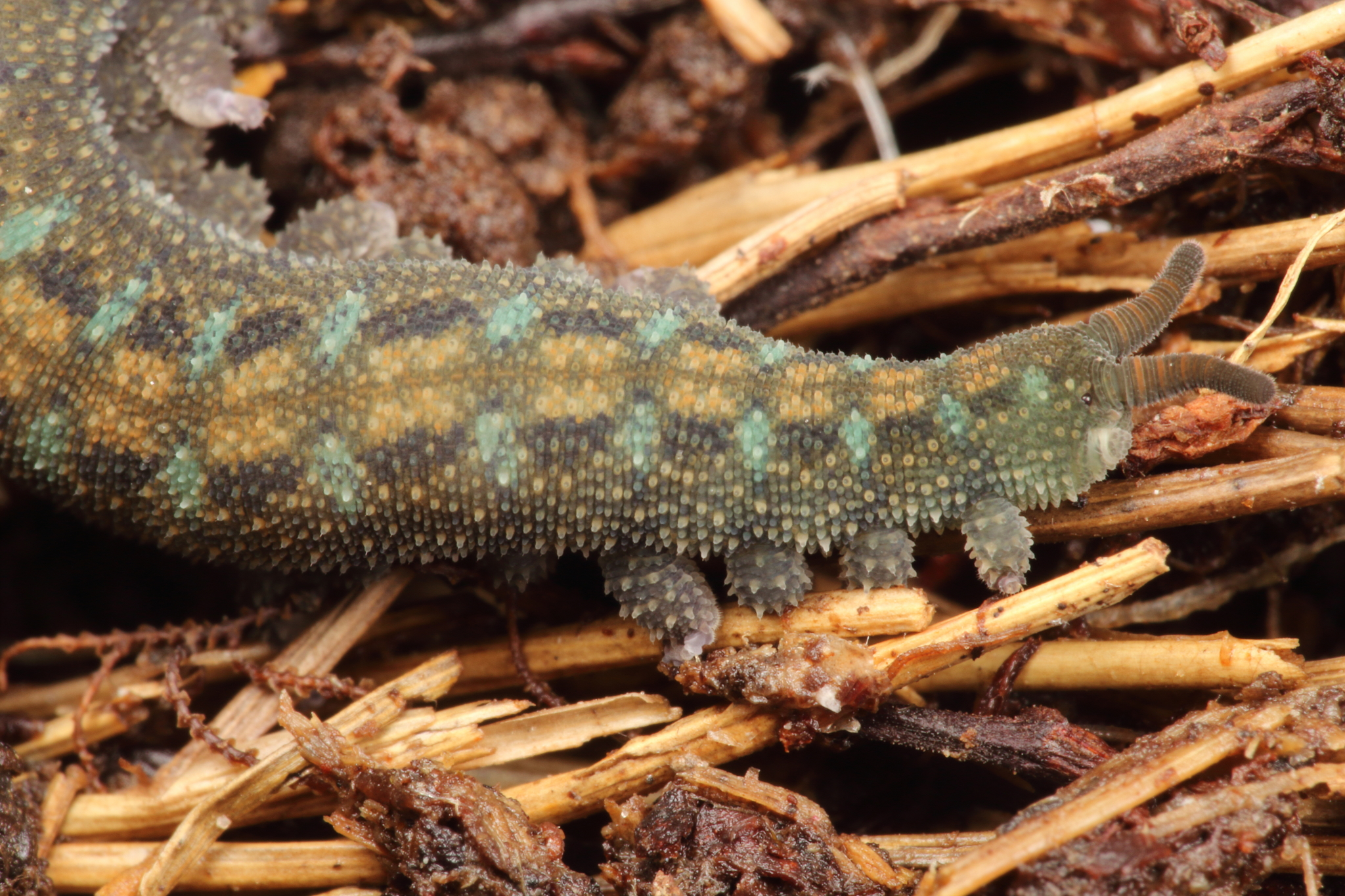
- Ooperipatellus viridimaculatus

Scientific classification
- Kingdom: Animalia
- Phylum: Onychophora
- Family: Peripatopsidae
- Genus: Ooperipatellus; Ruhberg, 1985

Species
- See text

= Ooperipatellus =

Genus of egg-laying Peripatopsid velvet worms

Ooperipatellus is a genus of velvet worms in the Peripatopsidae family. These velvet worms are found in Australia and New Zealand. Species in this genus are oviparous. This genus was proposed by the German zoologist Hilke Ruhberg in 1985, with Ooperipatellus insignis designated as the type species. This genus is notable as the only one in which velvet worms have no more than 14 pairs of legs.

== Description ==
Most species in this genus have 14 leg pairs, but O. nanus has only 13 pairs, the minimum number found in the phylum Onychophora. Velvet worms in this genus are also among the smallest known, with adults often only 10 to 20 mm long. Species in this genus range in size from O. nanus, which can be only 5 mm long, to O. nickmayeri, which can reach 60 mm in length.

Velvet worms in this genus have no modified head papillae, the males feature a cruciform genital opening (gonopore), and the females feature an ovipositor. This genus contains all oviparous velvet worm species with 13 or 14 leg pairs and no modified head structures (e.g., sclerotized head organs). Species in this genus also feature feet with three distal papillae (one anterior, one median, and one posterior), but no basal papillae.

== Phylogeny and biogeography ==
In spite of a disjoint geographic distribution across New Zealand, Tasmania, and Southern Australia, morphological and molecular data indicate that this genus is a monophyletic group. Molecular studies indicate that this clade includes two subclades, one containing species in New Zealand and the other containing species in both Tasmania and mainland Australia. The molecular evidence suggests that the New Zealand lineage of Ooperipatellus diverged from Australian lineage of Ooperipatellus about 75 million years ago, during the Late Cretaceous epoch. Paleogeographic evidence indicates that glacial events severed the land connection between Tasmania and mainland Australia more recently than rifting broke the land connection between Australia and New Zealand, which would be consistent with the phylogenetic tree that emerges from molecular studies of this genus.

== Species ==
The genus contains the following species:

- Ooperipatellus cryptus Jackson & Taylor, 1995
- Ooperipatellus cynocephalus Lord & Giribet, 2026
- Ooperipatellus decoratus (Baehr, 1977)
- Ooperipatellus duwilensis Reid, 1996
- Ooperipatellus insignis (Dendy, 1890)
- Ooperipatellus mathinnae Lord & Giribet, 2026
- Ooperipatellus nanus Ruhberg, 1985
- Ooperipatellus notus Lord & Giribet, 2026
- Ooperipatellus nickmayeri Oliveira & Mayer, 2017
- Ooperipatellus parvus Reid, 1996
- Ooperipatellus spenceri (Cockerell, 1913)
- Ooperipatellus viridimaculatus (Dendy, 1900)

In 2026, a phylogenetic analysis based on molecular data indicated that O. nickmayeri is a junior synonym of another species in the same genus, O. spenceri. Other references, however, list O. nickmayeri as a valid species. Authorities once considered O. cryptus a nomen dubium. This designation, however, has since been revoked.
