= Ooperipatellus decoratus =

Scientific classification
- Kingdom: Animalia
- Phylum: Onychophora
- Family: Peripatopsidae
- Genus: Ooperipatellus
- Species: O. decoratus

Binomial name
- Ooperipatellus decoratus (Baehr, 1977)

Species of egg-laying Peripatopsid velvet worm

Ooperipatellus decoratus is a species of velvet worm in the family Peripatopsidae. Like all velvet worms in the genus Ooperipatellus, this species is oviparous, and like most species in this genus, this velvet worm features 14 pairs of legs. This species is found in Tasmania, Australia.

== Discovery ==
This species was first described in 1977 by the German zoologist Martin Baehr. He based the original description of this species based on a male holotype and a female paratype collected from Dip River Falls, 8 km south of Mawbanna in northwest Tasmania, at an elevation about 250 meters above sea level. The holotype is deposited in the Australian National Insect Collection in Canberra, Australia. Since the original description of this species, many more specimens have been collected and studied, including 27 females and 23 males collected in 1993 and 1994 along the Murchison Highway about 8 km east of Waratah in northwest Tasmania.

== Description ==
The male of the species O. decoratus can range from 9 mm to 16 mm in length, whereas the female can range from 13 mm to 25 mm in length. Each antenna in adults features 51 rings, but the antennae in juveniles can have as few as 29 rings. The jaw features two blades, an inner blade and an outer blade. The inner blade of the jaw features one large tooth, five to seven (usually six) accessory teeth, and no diastema. The outer blade of the jaw feature one large tooth and no accessory teeth.

This species features 14 pairs of legs, with the last pair fully developed and bearing claws. The dorsal surface of the body features 12 complete plicae (transverse ridges) per segment. Each foot features three spinous pads and three distal papillae (one anterior, one median, and one posterior), but no basal papillae. On the fourth and fifth leg pairs, a nephridial tubercle divides the third spinous pad in the middle. In the male, the crural glands open on crural papillae on the ventral surface of the legs on leg pairs 6 through 13. The crural glands of leg pair 13 are long and extend into the body cavity, but these glands are short and usually confined to the legs on leg pairs 6 through 12. The gonopore in the male is cruciform, with the cross dividing the genital pad completely along both the transverse and longitudinal axes. A prominent ovipositor between the last pair of legs of the female features a longitudinal slit as the gonopore at the distal end.

The dorsal surface of this species ranges from light bluish, yellow, or orange to brown or black. The dorsal surface of this velvet worm features six distinct longitudinal rows of conspicuouly large papillae, arranged as three parallel rows on each side: a dorsal row, a lateral row, and a dorsolateral row in between the other two. The dorsolateral row of papillae on each side includes 15 large blue, yellow, or white papillae alternating with 15 large black papillae, with a smaller papilla in between each pair of these alternating larger papillae.

This species includes two distinct variations, each with a different pattern on the dorsal surface. In one pattern, a series of 15 lighter spots, each shaped like the letter V pointing toward the posterior, runs down the middle of the back with dark spaces in between the lighter spots, which are each interrupted in the middle by a narrow dark band. In the other pattern, a distinct black line runs down the middle with an adjacent bright orange longitudinal stripe on each side.

The ventral surface of this velvet worm is usually dark gray or black with many white papillae. The oral papillae are white, and in the female, the ovipositor is yellow. The antennae are black, dark blue, or blue-grey, but usually six rings (every eighth) on each antenna is orange, brown, or yellowish. The dorsal surface of the legs range from light brown to black. All three distal papillae and the ventral surfaces of all three spinous pads on each foot are blue.

== Taxonomy ==
Baehr originally described this species under the name Ooperipatus decoratus. In 1985, the German zoologist Hilke Ruhberg proposed the genus Ooperipatellus to include a subset of the oviparous velvet worms, including the velvet worm described by Baehr, but she deemed Ooperipatus decoratus to be a junior synonym of O. insignis, a similar velvet worm in the same genus found in the state of Victoria in mainland Australia. Authorities now recognize O. decoratus and O. insignis as distinct species, however, noting the significant distance (411 km) between the type localities of these two species and their separation by the Bass Strait.

=== Phylogeny ===
Multiple phylogenetic studies based on molecular data place the species O. decoratus in a clade with the Tasmanian species O. cryptus and the mainland species O. insignis. For example, studies published in 2017 and in 2026 place O. decoratus in a clade with O. insignis, with these two species forming a sister group for O. cryptus. ThIs molecular evidence suggests that O. insignis and O. cryptus are among the closest relatives of O. decoratus in a phylogenetic tree of the genus Ooperipatellus.

These three species share many traits that characterize the genus Ooperipatellus. For example, each of these species is oviparous, the female of each features an ovipositor with a longitudinal slit as the gonopore, and the male gonopore in each is cruciform. Furthermore, in each of these species, accessory teeth are absent from the outer jaw blade, and each foot features three distal papillae (one anterior, one median, and one posterior), but no basal papillae.

The species O. decoratus shares a more distinctive set of traits with the closely related species O. cryptus and O. insignis. For example, each of these three species usually features 12 complete plicae per segment on the dorsal surface. Furthermore, each species features 14 leg pairs with the last pair fully developed. Moreover, the male of each species features crural papillae on leg pairs 6 through 13.

The species O. decoratus can be distinguished from these other two species, however, based on other traits. For example, the dorsal surface of O. decoratus features a distinctive pattern of six longitudinal rows of large papillae, a pattern that is absent in the other species. Furthermore, each antenna features 51 rings in adults of the species O. decoratus but only 30 rings in the other two species.

== Reproduction ==
The female of the species O. decoratus lays eggs, which are produced in a single unpaired ovary. The eggs pass from the ovary through a pair of oviducts to the paired uteri. The uteri in adult females hold a varying number of eggs (from one to 20). The eggs are shaped like ovals measuring 2 mm in length and 1.4 mm in width. Most eggs in the uteri contain yolk, but some eggs hold pale embryos in varying stages of development. Immature eggs with yolk and those with embryos are not arranged in order, instead alternating irregularly in the uteri. The eggs when laid are the same size and shape as they are in the uteri. Juveniles can hatch about six or seven months after the eggs are laid, but those laid with embryos take less time to develop, and those laid with yolk take more time.

== Distribution and habitat ==
This species is found in western Tasmania. This velvet worm has been recorded as far north as Christmas Hills and as far east as the Central Plateau. This species has been collected as far south as Port Davey Track in Southwest National Park.

O. decoratus prefers to live in and under decaying and rotten logs and bark. This velvet worm can also be found under moss and on trees, under the bark and near the ground. Many specimens have been collected from moist woodland featuring mature Eucalyptus delegatensis trees, a shrub layer of Coprosma nitida, Pultenaea juniperina, Tasmannia lanceolata, and Asteraceae (such as Helichrysum and Olearia), and a ground layer of Diplarrena moraea. This species is also found in temperate rainforests with Atherosperma moschatum, Leptospermum lanigerum, and Dicksonia antarctica.
