= Yogetor spiralis =

Scientific classification
- Kingdom: Animalia
- Phylum: Arthropoda
- Subphylum: Chelicerata
- Class: Arachnida
- Order: Araneae
- Infraorder: Araneomorphae
- Family: Salticidae
- Genus: Yogetor
- Species: Y. spiralis

Binomial name
- Yogetor spiralis Wesołowska & Tomasiewicz, 2008

Species of spider

Yogetor spiralis is a species of jumping spider in the genus Yogetor that is endemic to Ethiopia. It was first described in 2008 by Wanda Wesołowska and Beata Tomasiewicz. The spider is medium-sized, with a brown cephalothorax between 1.6 and 2.1 mm (0.063 and 0.083 in) in length and abdomen between 1.8 and 2.6 mm (0.071 and 0.102 in) in length. The species has three distinctive yellow stripes on the thorax and colourless hairs on its black eye field. However, the most distinguishing feature is the design of the copulatory organs. The male has a short thin embolus on a rounded palpal bulb. The female has an epigyne that is large, lightly sclerotized, and shaped like a heart. It has two pockets, two rounded depressions divided by a ridge and very long spiralling seminal ducts ending in small spherical receptacles. The species is named tor the shape of the seminal ducts.

== Taxonomy ==
Yogetor spiralis is a species of jumping spider that was first described by Wanda Wesołowska and Beata Tomasiewicz in 2008. It is one of over 500 species identified by the Polish arachnologist Wesołowska. It was the second species in the genus Yogetor, which had been first raised by and Anthony Russell-Smith in 2000. The genus, named with a random set of letters, was designated for a genus distinguished by their copulatory organs. The male had a thin, very long embolus encircling the palpal bulb. The female had an epigyne with a pocket near the epigastric furrow, very wide fissured gonopores and spermathecae that are two spherical chambers. In Wayne Maddison's 2015 study of spider phylogenetic classification, the genus was declared a incertae sedis in the clade Salticinae. Maddison considered that it may be a member of the subtribe Plexippina in the tribe Plexippini. Two years later, in 2017, the genus was grouped with nine other genera of jumping spiders under the name Hyllines, which was named after the type genus Hyllus. Once again, it was the shape of the embolus that was critical in defining how the genus would be allocated. The species name relates to the design of the seminal ducts.

== Description ==
The spider is medium sized. The male has a cephalothorax that is between 1.6 and 1.9 mm (0.063 and 0.075 in) in length and between 1.1 and 1.3 mm (0.043 and 0.051 in) in width. It has a brown pear-shaped carapace that has a thin black line along the edges and more dark lines that radiate from the fovea. Three distinctive yellow stripes can be seen on the thorax. The abdomen is brown, with occasional long dark hairs, and between 1.8 and 2.2 mm (0.071 and 0.087 in) long and 1.1 and 1.3 mm (0.043 and 0.051 in) wide. It has a light jagged line on its exterior. The eye field is black and is covered with colourless hairs. The clypeus is brown, as are the chelicerae. In contrast, the legs and spinnerets are yellow, although there are large dark rings at the end of the legs. The copulatory organs are distinctive. The pedipalp is light brown, while the palpal bulb is more rounded and has a shorter embolus, though still thin, than other members of the genus.

The female is very similar, but is larger. The cephalothorax measures between 1.9 and 2.1 mm (0.075 and 0.083 in) from front to back and between 1.3 and 1.5 mm (0.051 and 0.059 in) from side to side. The abdomen is similarly slightly larger, measuring between 2.5 and 2.6 mm (0.098 and 0.102 in) in length and between 1.6 and 1.9 mm (0.063 and 0.075 in) in width. The colours and patterns are generally similar. However, the there is a more evident pattern of dark marks on the lower portion of the body. The epigyne is large, lightly sclerotized, and shaped like a heart. It has two pockets at the end, with a narrow ridge dividing two rounded depressions. The seminal ducts are very long and spiralled, ending in small spherical receptacles. This distinctive shape is recalled in the name of the species. Overall, the unusual shape of the epigyne distinguishes the species from related spiders.

== Distribution and habitat ==
The species is endemic to Ethiopia. The holotype for the species was found near Ambo in 1988. It has also been found in other rural areas of the country. It has generally been found in vegetation, including amongst grasses and plantations of Eucalyptus.
