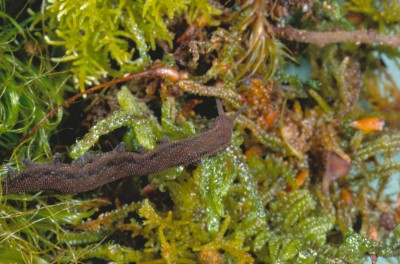

Conservation status
- Naturally Uncommon (NZ TCS)

Scientific classification
- Kingdom: Animalia
- Phylum: Onychophora
- Family: Peripatopsidae
- Genus: Ooperipatellus
- Species: O. nanus

Binomial name
- Ooperipatellus nanus Ruhberg, 1985

= Ooperipatellus nanus =

Species of egg-laying Peripatopsid velvet worm

Ooperipatellus nanus is a species of velvet worm in the family Peripatopsidae. This velvet worm is endemic to New Zealand and is found on the South Island. Like all velvet worms in the genus Ooperipatellus, this species is oviparous, but unlike other species in this genus, which have 14 pairs of legs, this species features only 13 leg pairs, the minimum number recorded in the phylum Onychophora.

== Discovery ==
This species was first described by the German zoologist Hilke Ruhberg in 1985. She based the original description of this species on four specimens including both sexes. These specimens were found at an altitude of 1,160 meters above sea level in the Takitimu Mountains on the South Island of New Zealand. Ruhberg did not designate a holotype because all four type specimens were juveniles. She deposited these syntypes with the Department of Scientific and Industrial Research in Auckland, New Zealand. Since the original description of this species, adult specimens have been collected and placed in the New Zealand Arthropod Collection.

== Phylogeny ==
Phylogenetic analysis using molecular data consistently places O. nanus in a clade with other species of Ooperipatellus found in New Zealand. Multiple studies also find that these species together form a sister group for a clade containing the species of Ooperipatellus found in Australia. For example, a study published in 2010 places O. nanus in a clade with O. viridimaculatus, the only other species of Ooperipatellus described from New Zealand. This study also find that these two species form a sister group for an undescribed species of Ooperipatellus found in New Zealand and that these three New Zealand species together form a sister group for O. insignis, the only Australian representative of Ooperipatellus included in this analysis.

== Description ==
Ooperipatellus nanus is a small velvet worm, ranging from 5 mm to about 10 mm in length. This species is smaller than most species of Ooperipatellus, which usually range between 10 mm and 20 mm in length. This velvet worm features only 13 pairs of legs, which become smaller in the posterior third of the body. The last pair, however, are well developed and feature claws. Each foot has three spinous pads, with the second pad 2.5 to 3 times as wide as the third. The ovipositor between the last leg pair in the female of this species is prominent and nearly as long as the last legs. The jaw features two blades, an inner blade with five accessory teeth and an outer blade without accessory teeth.

This species is tan or brown, which turns to pale yellow or light ochre when preserved in ethanol. A line down the middle of the back is clearly defined in this background color. A dark brown band is visible on each side between this line and the top of the legs. The ventral surface is yellow. The antennae are gray-blue and dark brown but blue-gray at the distal ends.

This species shares many traits with its close relative O. viridimaculatus that are characteristic of the genus Ooperipatellus. For example, the female in both of these species features a well developed ovipositor between the last pair of legs. Furthermore, the jaw in each species features two blades, an inner blade with several accessory teeth and an outer blade without accessory teeth.

These two species can be distinguished, however, based on other traits. For example, the species O. nanus features only 13 leg pairs, whereas the species O. viridimaculatus features the 14 leg pairs usually found in the genus Ooperipatellus. Furthermore, the species O. viridimaculatus features two rows of distinctive spots running down its back, whereas these spots are absent in the species O. nanus. Moreover, the species O. viridimaculatus ranges from 30 mm to 50 mm in length, notably larger than the species O. nanus.

== Distribution and habitat ==
The species O. nanus has a narrow range on the South Island of New Zealand: This velvet worm is found only in the Takitimu Mountains in the Southland region. This species is found mainly in rotting beech logs.

== Conservation status ==
In 2018, the New Zealand Department of Conservation published a report listing this species as "At Risk, Naturally Uncommon" with the qualifier of "One Location" under the New Zealand Threat Classification System. This conservation status indicates that this species is confined to a specific geographic area. This species had previously been placed in the equivalent "Range Restricted" category.
