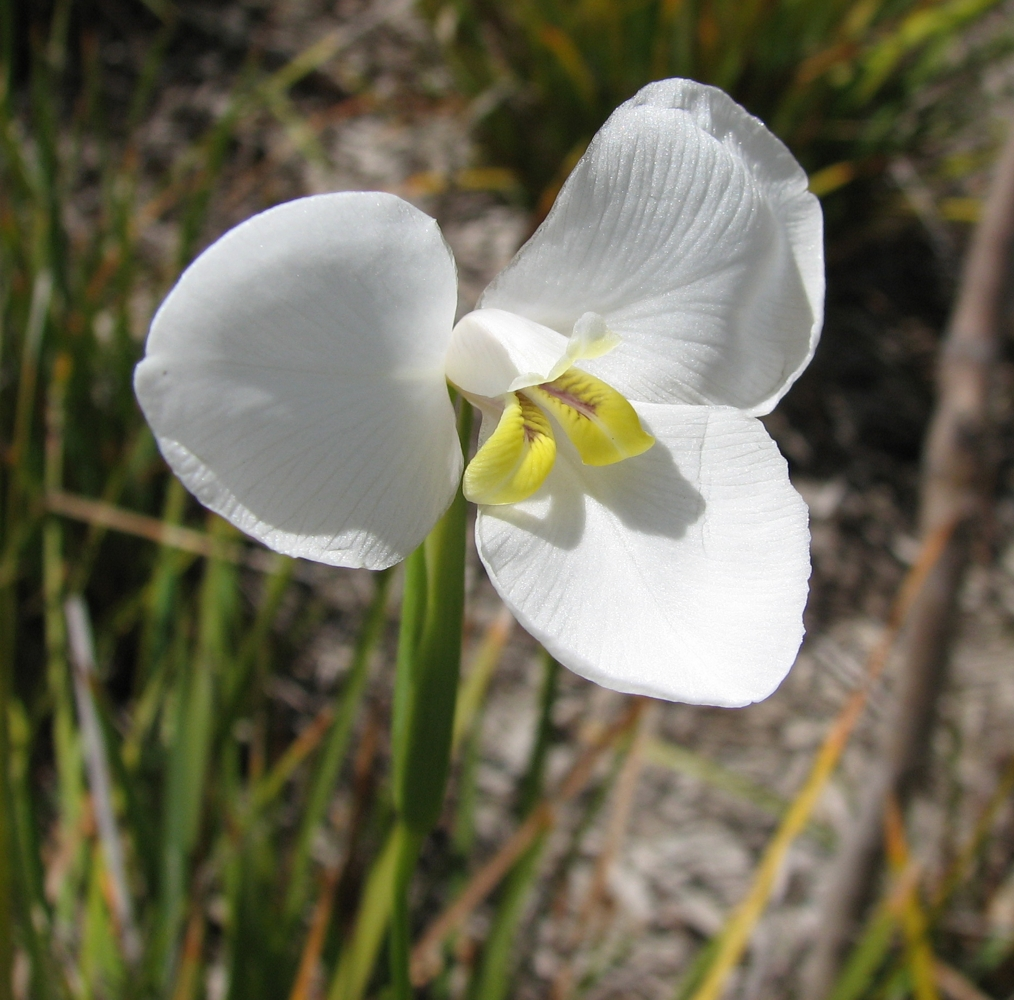
- Diplarrena moraea

Scientific classification
- Kingdom: Plantae
- Clade: Tracheophytes
- Clade: Angiosperms
- Clade: Monocots
- Order: Asparagales
- Family: Iridaceae
- Subfamily: Iridoideae
- Tribe: Diplarreneae; Goldblatt
- Genus: Diplarrena; Labill.

Type species
- Diplarrena moraea Labillardière

Species
- Diplarrena moraea Diplarrena latifolia

= Diplarrena =

Genus of flowering plants

Diplarrena is a genus of flowering plants in the family Iridaceae. The two species are endemic to Australia. The name is from Greek diploos ("double") and arren ("male"); plants in the genus have only two functional stamens, while all other Iridaceae have three. The name is often misspelled Diplarrhena, an error that began with George Bentham's Flora Australiensis in 1873.

These plants are tufted perennial herbs with short rhizomes. The leaves are basal, linear, flat, and present all year. The stem is erect, with a few reduced leaves. Flowers appear one at a time from a green terminal spathe. They are iris-like but distinctly zygomorphic. There are six white tepals and a style with two thread-like branches.

There are two species:

| Image | Scientific name | Description | Distribution |
|---|---|---|---|
| | Diplarrena moraea Labill. 1800 | It has leaves up to a centimeter wide. The flowers are 5 to 6 centimeters wide, with blunt-tipped outer tepals 1.5 to 2.5 centimeters wide. The inner tepals are often tinged or veined with purple, and are yellowish at the tips. | Tasmania, Victoria and New South Wales. |
| | Diplarrena latifolia Benth. 1873 | Larger plant with leaves 1 to 2.2 centimeters wide. The flowers are 6 to 8 centimeters wide with strongly purple-veined, yellow-tipped inner tepals. The species may be a regional variant of D. moraea. | Tasmania |

The cultivar 'Amethyst Fairy' is a large-flowered selection with darker markings on the inner tepals.
