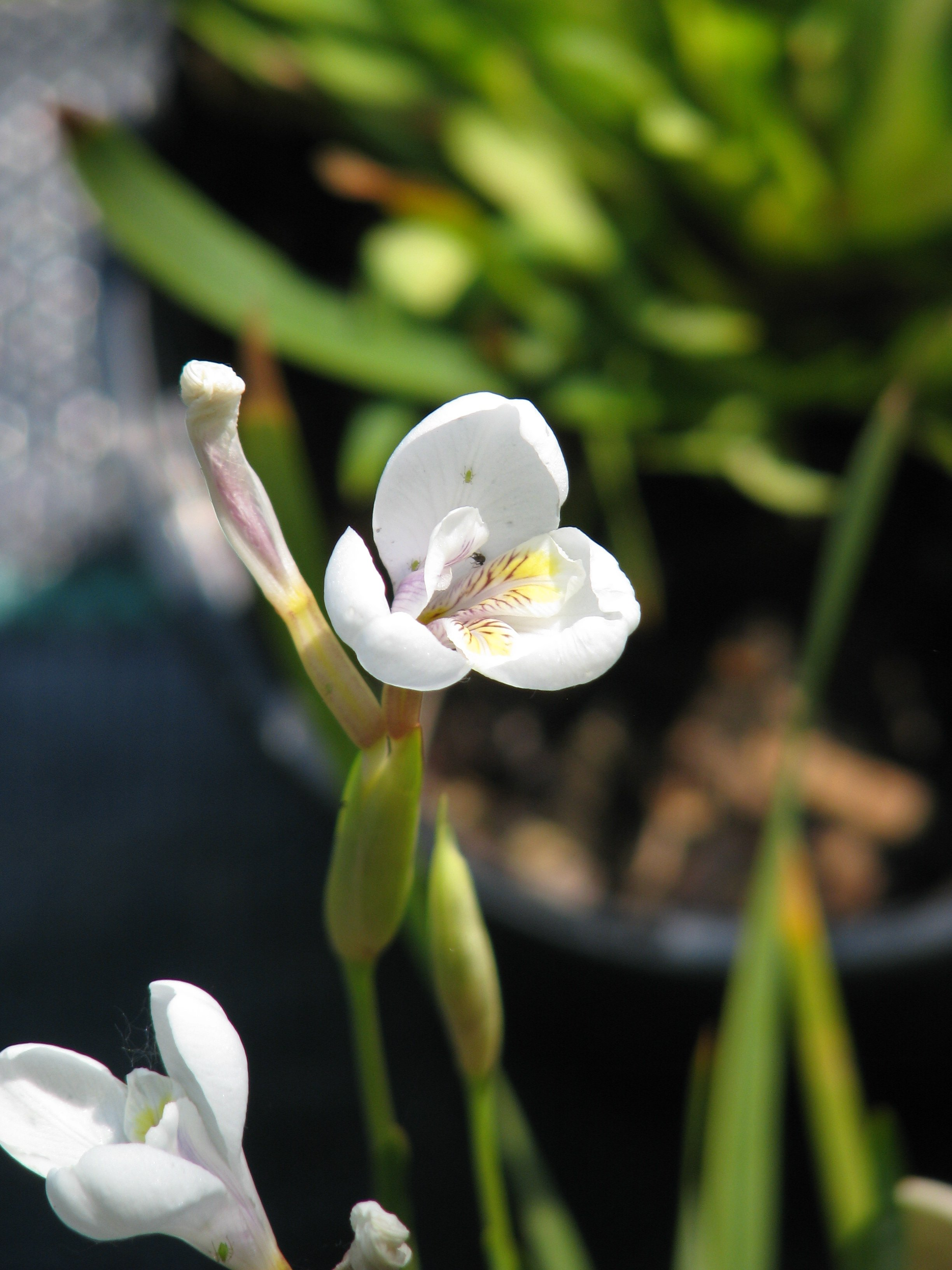

Scientific classification
- Kingdom: Plantae
- Clade: Tracheophytes
- Clade: Angiosperms
- Clade: Monocots
- Order: Asparagales
- Family: Iridaceae
- Genus: Diplarrena
- Species: D. latifolia

Binomial name
- Diplarrena latifolia Benth.

Synonyms
- Diplarrena moraea latifolia (Benth.) Baker

= Diplarrena latifolia =

Species of flowering plant

Diplarrena latifolia, the western flag iris, is a member of the iris family, Iridaceae. It occurs in Tasmania. It was first described by George Bentham in 1873.
