= Yogetor =

Scientific classification
- Kingdom: Animalia
- Phylum: Arthropoda
- Subphylum: Chelicerata
- Class: Arachnida
- Order: Araneae
- Infraorder: Araneomorphae
- Family: Salticidae
- Subfamily: Salticinae
- Genus: Yogetor; Wesolowska & Russell-Smith, 2000

Type species
- Y. bellus Wesolowska & Russell-Smith, 2000

Species
- Y. bellus Wesolowska & Russell-Smith, 2000 – Tanzania; Y. spiralis Wesolowska & Tomasiewicz, 2008 – Ethiopia

Genus of spiders

Yogetor is a genus of East African jumping spiders that was first described by Wanda Wesołowska & A. Russell-Smith in 2000. As of September 2019, it contains two species, found in Ethiopia and Tanzania: Y. bellus and Y. spiralis.
