= Yogetor bellus =

Scientific classification
- Kingdom: Animalia
- Phylum: Arthropoda
- Subphylum: Chelicerata
- Class: Arachnida
- Order: Araneae
- Infraorder: Araneomorphae
- Family: Salticidae
- Genus: Yogetor
- Species: Y. bellus

Binomial name
- Yogetor bellus Wesołowska & Russell-Smith, 2000

Species of spider

Yogetor bellus is a species of spider in the family Salticidae found in Tanzania. It was first described in 2000.
