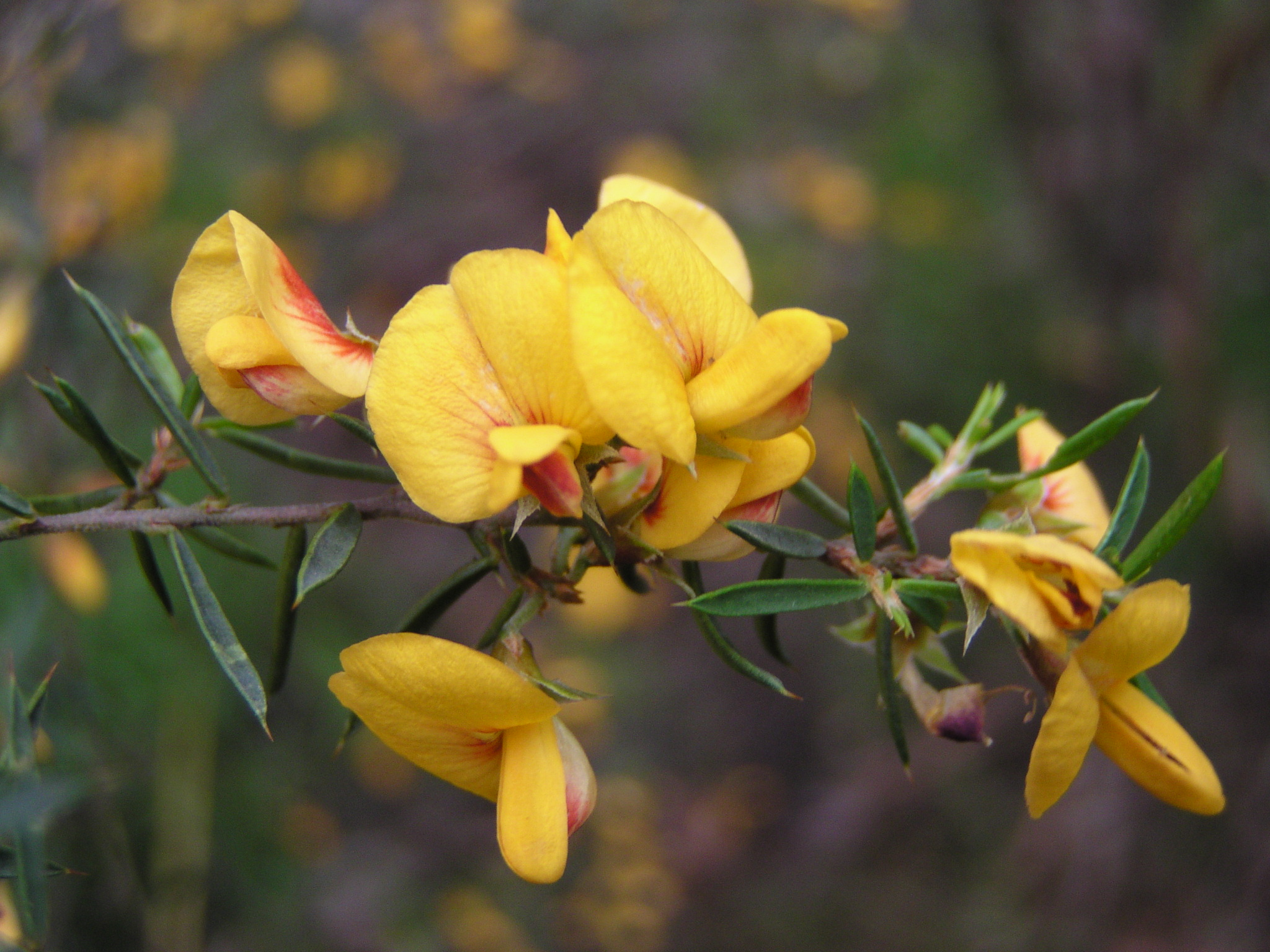
- In the Big River State Forest, Victoria

Scientific classification
- Kingdom: Plantae
- Clade: Tracheophytes
- Clade: Angiosperms
- Clade: Eudicots
- Clade: Rosids
- Order: Fabales
- Family: Fabaceae
- Subfamily: Faboideae
- Genus: Pultenaea
- Species: P. juniperina

Binomial name
- Pultenaea juniperina Labill.

Synonyms
- List: Pultenaea cordata Hook.; Pultenaea cordata Graham nom. illeg., nom. superfl.; Pultenaea cordifolia Benth. orth. var.; Pultenaea forsythiana Blakely; Pultenaea forsythiana Blakely var. forsythiana; Pultenaea forsythiana var. uniflora Blakely; Pultenaea juniperina Labill. var. juniperina; Pultenaea juniperina var. latifolia Benth.; Pultenaea juniperina var. leiocalyx Blakely; Pultenaea juniperina var. macrophylla Wawra

= Pultenaea juniperina =

Prickly bush-pea

Species of legume

Pultenaea juniperina, commonly known as prickly bush-pea or prickly beauty is a species of flowering plant in the family Fabaceae and is endemic to south-eastern Australia. It is an erect, spiky shrub with hairy stems, linear to narrow elliptic leaves with stipules at the base, and yellow-orange and red flowers.

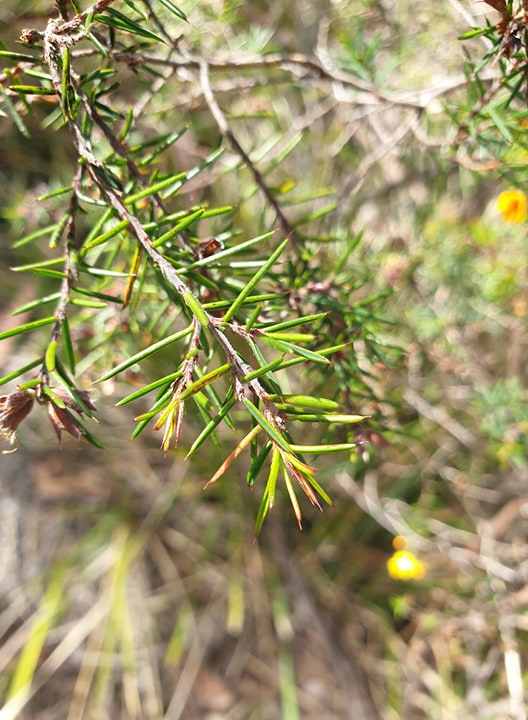
Leaf morphology

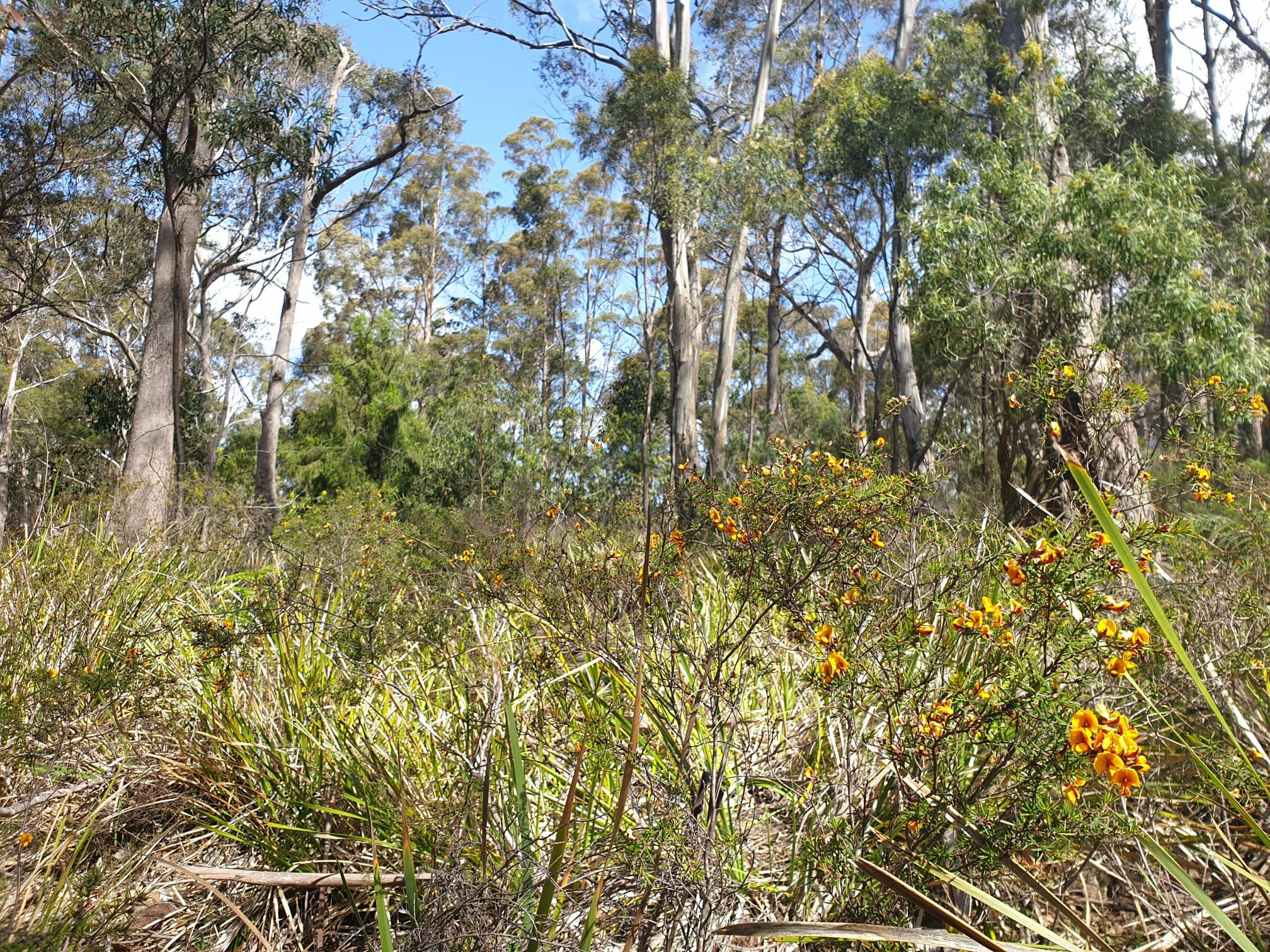
Habitat

== Description ==
Pultenaea juniperina is an erect shrub that typically grows to a height of 1.2–3 m (3 ft 11 in – 9 ft 10 in) and has its young stems covered with curled hairs. The leaves are arranged alternately, varying in shape from linear to narrow elliptic, narrow egg-shaped with the narrower end towards the base, or lance shaped, often concave, often heart-shaped at the base and taper to a sharp point on the tip. They are mostly 5–30 mm (0.20–1.18 in) long and 1.5–2.5 mm (0.059–0.098 in) wide with a lance-shaped stipule 2–3 mm (0.079–0.118 in) long at the base. The lower surface of the leaves is darker than the upper surface and the edges are sometimes curved downwards.

The flowers are 7–13 mm (0.28–0.51 in) long, arranged singly or in clusters, in leaf axils near the ends of short side-shoots with egg-shaped, tapering bracts 2 mm (0.079 in) long, each flower on a pedicel 2–3 mm (0.079–0.118 in) long. The sepals are 4–7 mm (0.16–0.28 in) long with lance-shaped bracteoles 1.5–3 mm (0.059–0.118 in) long at the base. The standard petal is yellow to orange with red striations, the wings yellow to orange and the keel yellow with a red tip or all red. Flowering occurs from October to November and the fruit is a hairy pod, the lower half enclosed with the remains of the sepals.

== Taxonomy and naming ==
Pultenaea juniperina was first formally described in 1805 by Jacques Labillardière in his book Novae Hollandiae Plantarum Specimen. The specific epithet (juniperina) means "juniper-like".

The common name "prickly bush-pea" is used on the mainland for this species and for the rare Pultenaea aristata. "Prickly beauty" is given as the common name in Tasmania,

Varieties of P. juniperina have been described, but the names are not accepted by the Australian Plant Census:

- Pultenaea juniperina var. latifolia Labill., and implicitly the autonym P. juniperina Labill. var. juniperina, were described by George Bentham in Flora Australiensis and are regarded as synonyms of P. juniperina;
- Pultenaea juniperina var. leiocalyx Blakely described in Contributions from the New South Wales National Herbarium in 1941, is regarded as a synonym of P. juniperina;
- Pultenaea juniperina var. macrophylla Wawra published in Itinera principum S. Coburgi is also regarded as a synonym of P. juniperina;
- Pultenaea juniperina var. mucronata (Benth.) Corrick published in the journal Muelleria is regarded as a synonym of the previously published P. juniperina var. planifolia;
- Pultenaea juniperina var. planifolia H.B.Will. published in the Proceedings of the Royal Society of Victoria is regarded as a synonym of P. blakelyi Joy Thomps.

Pultenaea forsythiana Blakely is also regarded as a synonym of P. juniperina, but is an accepted species in Victoria.

== Distribution and habitat ==
Prickly bush-pea is endemic to south-eastern Australia where it grows in forest, woodland and heath. In New South Wales it occurs in the Armidale area and on the coast and tablelands south from the Brindabella Range, including in the Australian Capital Territory and Kosciuszko National Park. In Victoria it is treated as distinct from Pultenaea forsythiana. If records of that species are included, P. juniperina is widespread in the southern half of Victoria. The species is widespread in Tasmania.
