= Keith 'Shebada' Ramsay =

Jamaican actor

Keith "Shebada" Ramsay is a Jamaican actor and comedian, best known for his appearances in 'roots' plays.

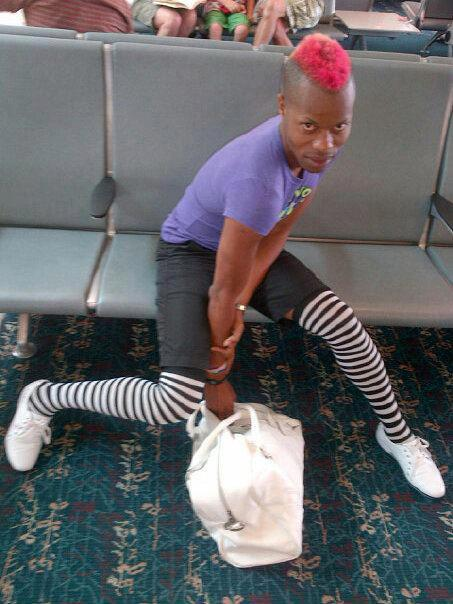
Keith 'Shebada' Ramsay in 2012

== Early life ==
Keith Ramsay was born in Kingston, Jamaica, where he attended the Franklyn Town New Testament Church of God and Clan Carthy High School. He was given the nickname 'Shebada' by his father.

== Career ==
In 2006, he entered the first season of the CVM TV comedian elimination show, Comedy Buss, where he placed third. From there, he was recruited by Stages Productions to appear in the roots play Bashment Granny. The Jamaica Gleaner reviewed the play by saying: "Multi-talented Keith Ramsay is the pulsing heart of the show. He is the ever present next door neighbour who appears male yet seems to personify the stereotype that is ghetto female. The question of his sexuality is perhaps answered best by 'Shebada' himself, when he says 'mi deh pon di border line.'"

The play was a smash hit which played until June, 2007 at the Ward Theatre, Kingston. His following play, Shebada Comes to Town, debuted in July 2007. The play was based on the journey of Shebada, a country boy, to the big city, where he finds a room in a tenement yard occupied by a seedy and diverse group of characters. The Gleaner stated: "Judging by the reviews and pop culture references to his on stage character, Ramsey is a budding star with his delightful sense of comedic timing and delivery, razor sharp wit and gift of physical comedy." A two-month run was followed by a tour of the Jamaican and West Indian diaspora in the United States, Canada, and England. The play was succeeded by another roots play, Like Father, Like Son, and 2008 saw the debut of Di Driva, by Paul O'Beale, at the Green Gables Theatre, Cargill Avenue, St. Andrew. The play tells the story of a politician and his wife, a former beauty queen, and their unsuccessful attempts to produce offspring.

Bashment Granny 2 opened just before Christmas 2008, and was a sequel to the 2007 play with a script by Garfield Reid. The play looks at the influence of money as a class divider and a tool of corrupt practices.

In 2009, work began on a film version of Bashment Granny, with Paul O'Beale as director and producer. The filming was done on location in Jamaica and in England. The movie was scheduled to open in June 2010, but was postponed. Meanwhile, a new play, Serious Business, which deals with a corrupt revivalist preacher, played to sell-out Jamaican and West Indian audiences both at home and abroad.

== GhettOut ==
A new comedy, GhettOut, by Michael Denton, directed by B. L. Allen, premiered on Friday, 30 July 2010, at the Green Gables Theatre, St. Andrew. GhettOut tells the story of Barbara, who inherits $2 million following the mysterious death of her husband in the United States. In a near-rave review of the play, the Gleaner said: "one of the hardest skills for an actor to master is the spontaneous reaction; Ramsay does it effortlessly, creating on-the-fly responses to heckling patrons while keeping one ear in the scene. Though young, his experience as a comedian shows in his intuitive knowledge of what the audience sees." The review adds: "If most of the (Stages) company's success can be attributed to business acumen, the remainder must go to the talent of their stars, especially one Keith Ramsay. Pop sociologist Malcolm Gladwell says the difference between mediocrity and genius in any field is 10,000 hours of practice. As 'Shebada', Ramsay is racking up the hours, and all that practice has made him very funny."

A situation comedy, "The Jamaicans," featuring Keith Ramsay, and others, aired on CVM-TV, 15 November 2010.

In a cultural review of 2010, "And it's a Wrap," the Jamaica Observer's columnist wrote: "Locally, Shebada's culture reign continues unabated. He needs his own Twitter following. I finally saw GhettOut way late in the run. Loved it! The show continues to pack the house and deliver the raucous roar of the audience. Jamaica is one of the most complicated places in the world because who would predict that the leading theatrical export (bigger than Oliver Yu Large, Miss Lou, etc combined) would be the gay-baiting caricature from a place proclaimed to be one of the most homophobic on Earth. Explain that!" The Observer went on to pronounce GhettOut as 2010's "Theatre Production of the Year."

== Television ==
A new situation comedy, Shebada in Charge, debuted on 17 October 2013 on CVM-TV, Jamaica.

== Personal life ==
In May 2007, the Jamaica Star newspaper reported that, one week after Ramsay announced he was getting married, the woman identified as his fiancée, Keisha Shaw, claimed that he was using her name to dispel rumours that he was gay. He, however, maintained that they shared a relationship and were in love. Ramsay refuses either to confirm or deny ongoing speculation about his sexual orientation. "How is it going to help you if I say yes or no? Is it going to give you a job?" he said in an interview with The Star.

== Plays featuring Keith Ramsay ==
- Bashment Granny (2006)
- Shebada Come To Town (2007)
- Like Father, Like Son (2008)
- Di Driva (2008)
- Bashment Granny 2 (2009)
- Serious Business (2010)
- Ghettout (2010)
- Double Dose (2011)
- The Politicians (2012)
- De Weddin Scamma (2012)
- Krosses (2013)
- Clash (2013)
- The Prophet (2014)
- Bashment Granny 3 (2015)
- Bangarang (2016)
- Chixta (2017)
- Set Up (2018)
- Man Problem (2023)
