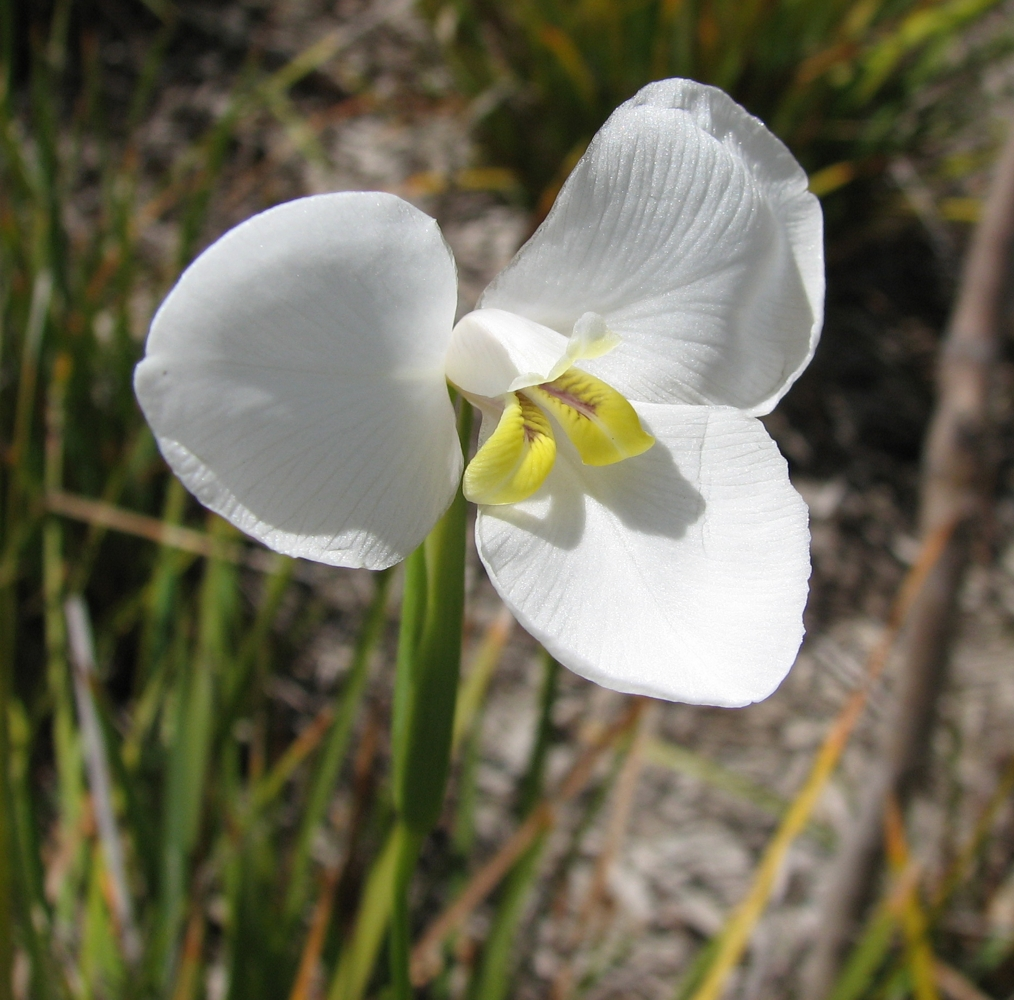

Scientific classification
- Kingdom: Plantae
- Clade: Tracheophytes
- Clade: Angiosperms
- Clade: Monocots
- Order: Asparagales
- Family: Iridaceae
- Genus: Diplarrena
- Species: D. moraea

Binomial name
- Diplarrena moraea Labill.

Synonyms
- Moraea diandra Vahl nom. illeg.

= Diplarrena moraea =

Species of flowering plant

Diplarrena moraea, commonly known as white iris (or butterfly flag in the UK), is a member of the iris family, Iridaceae. It occurs in Australian heathland and forest in New South Wales, Victoria and Tasmania.

The species was formally described in 1800 by French naturalist Jacques Labillardière in Relation du Voyage à la Recherche de la Pérouse.

Diplarrena moraea is included in the Tasmanian Fire Service's list of low flammability plants, indicating that it is suitable for growing within a building protection zone.
