= Ooperipatellus insignis =

Scientific classification
- Kingdom: Animalia
- Phylum: Onychophora
- Family: Peripatopsidae
- Genus: Ooperipatellus
- Species: O. insignis

Binomial name
- Ooperipatellus insignis (Dendy, 1890)

Species of egg-laying Peripatopsid velvet worm

Ooperipatellus insignis is a species of velvet worm in the family Peripatopsidae. This velvet worm is found in Australia. Like all velvet worms in the genus Ooperipatellus, this species is oviparous, and like most species in this genus, this velvet worm features 14 pairs of legs. This velvet worm was the first species in this genus to be described and has been designated as the type species for this genus.

== Discovery ==
This species was first described in 1890 by the English zoologist Arthur Dendy. He based the original description of this species on five specimens, but he did not designate a holotype. These specimens were collected by the British naturalist Henry R. Hogg, who found them in and on decaying wood on Mount Macedon in the state of Victoria in Australia at an elevation of 1,001 meters above sea level. Two syntypes are deposited in the Museum National d’Histoire Naturelle in Paris, France.

== Taxonomy ==
Dendy originally described this species under the name Peripatus insignis. Later in 1900, he proposed the genus Ooperipatus to contain this species along with all other oviparous velvet worms. In 1985, the German zoologist Hilke Ruhberg proposed the genus Ooperipatellus to include a subset of the oviparous velvet worms, including O. insignis, which she designated as the type species.

Authorities have sometimes deemed other species of Ooperipatellus to be junior synonyms of O. insignis, including O. viridimaculatus, which is found in New Zealand, and O. decoratus and O. spenceri, which are both found in Tasmania. Studies based on molecular data, however, indicate that O. insignis is a distinct species separate from the Ooperipatellus species found in New Zealand and Tasmania. Authorities now regard these velvet worms as separate species, citing not only the molecular evidence but also the bodies of water and significant distances between the type locality of O. insignis and the type localities of the other species (411 km for O. decoratus, 652 km for O. spenceri, and 2,113 km for O. viridimaculatus).

== Phylogeny ==
A 1996 study based on morphology places the species O. insignis in a clade with the only other described species in the same genus found in Victoria, Australia, O. duwilensis. In this phylogenetic analysis, the species O. duwilensis emerges as the closest relative of O. insignis in a phylogenetic tree. These two species are so similar that specimens of O. duwilensis have been misidentified and assigned to O. insignis.

== Description ==
Females of this species range from 5 mm to 39 mm in length and from 1 mm to 5 mm in width, whereas males range from 4 mm to 30 mm in length and from 0.7 mm to 3.5 mm in width. The head features eyes and 30 complete rings on each of the antennae. The jaw features two blades, an inner blade and an outer blade. The inner blade features one large tooth, about five smaller accessory teeth, and no diastema. Accessory teeth are absent on the outer blade.

This species has 14 pairs of legs in each sex, with claws on each leg including the last pair, which are well developed and barely reduced in size. The dorsal surface of the body features 12 complete plicae (transverse ridges) between adjacent leg pairs. The feet each feature thee spinous pads on the ventral surface. The proximal pad is narrow, and on the fourth and fifth leg pairs, a nephridial tubercle interrupts the proximal pad. On some legs, especially the last pair, the proximal pad breaks up transversely. Each foot also features three distal papillae (one anterior, one median over the claws, and one posterior), but no basal papillae. The male of this species features crural papillae on the ventral surface of the legs from leg pairs 6 through 13. The crural glands of leg pair 13 are long and extend into the body cavity, but the crural glands anterior to leg pair 13 do not extend into the body cavity. The male gonopore is cruciform, with all four arms of the cross equal in length. The female of this species features an obvious ovipositor between the last leg pair with a longitudinal slit as the gonopore at the tip.

This species can range from brownish to a dark indigo blue, which becomes gray-green when the velvet worm is preserved in ethanol. A narrow dark stripe runs down the middle of the back. The dorsal surface features a checkerboard pattern formed by lighter patches of tan, dull orange, or yellow alternating with darker diamonds in the background color. This pattern may be obscure, however, especially in darker specimens. The ventral surface lacks pigment and is pale and yellowish, the ovipositor is pale yellow, and the oral papillae are white. The spinous pads on the feet are pale yellow but shade darker, with the distal pad the darkest, and the distal papillae are dark. The antennae feature a tan band on every fourth ring starting with the fifth ring from the base.

This species exhibits many of the traits that characterize the genus Ooperipatellus. For example, this species is oviparous, the ovipositor between the last pair of legs of the female features a longitudinal slit as the gonopore at the distal end, and the male gonopore is cruciform. Furthermore, accessory teeth are absent from the outer jaw blade, and each foot features three distal papillae (one anterior, one median, and one posterior), but no basal papillae.

This species shares an especially extensive set of traits with its close relative O. duwilensis. For example, each of these species features 30 complete rings on each antenna, an inner jaw blade with no diastema, 14 leg pairs with the last pair fully developed, 12 complete plicae on the dorsal surface between adjacent leg pairs, three spinous pads on each foot, and a male gonopore shaped like a cross with four arms of equal length. Furthermore, the male in each species features long crural glands extending from leg pair 13 into the body cavity and anterior crural glands that do not extend into the body cavity.

These closely related species can be distinguished based on other traits. For example, the antennae in O. insignis feature tan bands that are absent in O. duwilensis. Furthermore, the male of the species O. duwilensis features crural papillae on the legs from leg pair 9 or 10 through 13, a less extensive set of legs with crural papillae than observed in the species O. insignis.

== Distribution and habitat ==
This species is found in and under rotten logs. This velvet worm can be found all over Mount Macedon in the state of Victoria in Australia, unlike the sympatric species Ooperipatus oviparus, which is limited to lower elevations on this mountain. Specimens assigned to this species have been collected elsewhere, not only in New Zealand and Tasmania, where such specimens are now assigned to other species, but also in other localities in Victoria. For example, this velvet worm has been recorded in Kinglake National Park, Emerald, Elmhurst, Ferntree Gully, and Gembrook, as well as on Mount Donna Buang. A redescription of this species published by the Australian zoologist Amanda L. Reid in 1996, however, includes only specimens from the type locality (Mount Macedon) and regards other specimens with caution.
