= Ooperipatellus cryptus =

Scientific classification
- Kingdom: Animalia
- Phylum: Onychophora
- Family: Peripatopsidae
- Genus: Ooperipatellus
- Species: O. cryptus

Binomial name
- Ooperipatellus cryptus Jackson & Taylor, 1995

Species of egg-laying Peripatopsid velvet worm

Ooperipatellus cryptus is a species of velvet worm in the family Peripatopsidae. This species is found in Tasmania, Australia. Like all velvet worms in the genus Ooperipatellus, this species is oviparous, and like all Tasmanian species in this genus, this velvet worm features 14 pairs of legs.

== Discovery ==
This species was first described briefly in 1995 by Jean Jackson and Robert Taylor, who did not explicitly designate type specimens or a type locality. They report finding the main population of this species near Christmas Hills, Arthur River, and the Rapid River, however, and authorities regard this area in Tasmania, Australia, as the type locality for this species. In 2007, the German biologist Claudia Brockmann described this species in more detail based on both museum specimens and newly discovered specimens.

== Description ==
The species O. cryptus is small, ranging from 9 mm to 18 mm in length. Each antenna features 30 rings. The jaw features two blades, an inner blade with five to seven accessory teeth, and an outer blade with no accessory teeth. This velvet worm features 14 pairs of legs, with the last pair fully developed and bearing claws. The dorsal surface of the body usually features 12 complete plicae (transverse ridges) per segment. Each foot features three distal papillae (one anterior, one median, and one posterior), but no basal papillae. On the fourth and fifth leg pairs, a nephridial tubercle divides the third spinous pad on each foot in the middle. In the male, crural papillae are present on leg pairs 6 through 13. The crural glands of leg pair 13 extend into the body cavity, but these glands are usually short and confined to the legs on leg pairs 6 through 11. The gonopore in the male is cruciform, with the cross dividing the genital pad completely only along the transverse axis. The gonopore in the female is a longitudinal slit on the ovipositor.

The dorsal surface of this species is pale, ranging from beige to yellowish, with a blue or mauve stripe running down the middle of the back and blue or mauve papillae arranged in transverse rows. The legs are usually solid blue but can (rarely) feature orange spots. The antennae are solid blue, mostly dark blue, but the distal rings are light blue. The ventral surface is white or light yellow with light gray or light bluish papillae arranged in transverse rows.

== Phylogeny ==
Multiple phylogenetic studies based on molecular data place the species O. cryptus in a clade with the Tasmanian species O. decoratus and the Australian mainland species O. insignis. For example, studies published in 2017 and in 2026 place O. decoratus in a clade with O. insignis, with these two species forming a sister group for O. cryptus. This molecular evidence suggests that O. insignis and O. decoratus are among the closest relatives of O. cryptus in a phylogenetic tree of the genus Ooperipatellus.

These three species share many traits that characterize the genus Ooperipatellus. For example, each of these species is oviparous, the female of each features an ovipositor with a longitudinal slit as the gonopore, and the male gonopore in each is cruciform. Furthermore, in each of these species, accessory teeth are absent from the outer jaw blade, and each foot features three distal papillae (one anterior, one median, and one posterior), but no basal papillae.

The species O. cryptus shares a more distinctive set of traits with the closely related species O. decoratus and O. insignis. For example, each of these three species usually features 12 complete plicae per segment on the dorsal surface. Furthermore, each species features 14 leg pairs with the last pair fully developed. Moreover, the male of each species features crural papillae on leg pairs 6 through 13.

The species O. cryptus can be distinguished from the species O. decoratus, however, based on other traits. For example, the dorsal surface of O. decoratus features a distinctive pattern of six longitudinal rows of large papillae, a pattern that is absent in O. cryptus. Furthermore, each antenna features 51 rings in adults of the species O. decoratus but only 30 rings in O. cryptus.

Although each antenna in both O. cryptus and O. insignis features 30 rings, these two species can be distinguished based on other traits. For example, the antennae feature tan bands in O. insignis but are solid blue in O. cryptus. Furthermore, the male gonopore is shaped like a cross with transverse and longitudinal slits of equal length in O. insignis, but in O. cryptus, the transverse slit is longer than the longitudinal slit.

== Habitat and behavior ==
The species O. cryptus is found in or under rotting tree trunks. These velvet worms are usually hidden deep (8 cm to 20 cm) in heavily rotted logs rather than near the surface. This species is found in dense sclerophyll forests of Eucalyptus trees and in rainforests.

When disturbed, this velvet worm quickly curls up into a tight coil as a defensive behavior. When coiled, the velvet worm rolls into crevices in the litter or soil. Given this behavior, this velvet worm is difficult to collect in the field.

== Distribution ==
This species is found in northwestern Tasmania. This velvet worm has been recorded as far west as the town of Arthur River on the west coast of Tasmania. This species has also been collected as far east as the Gawler River.
