= Diastema =

Gap between two teeth

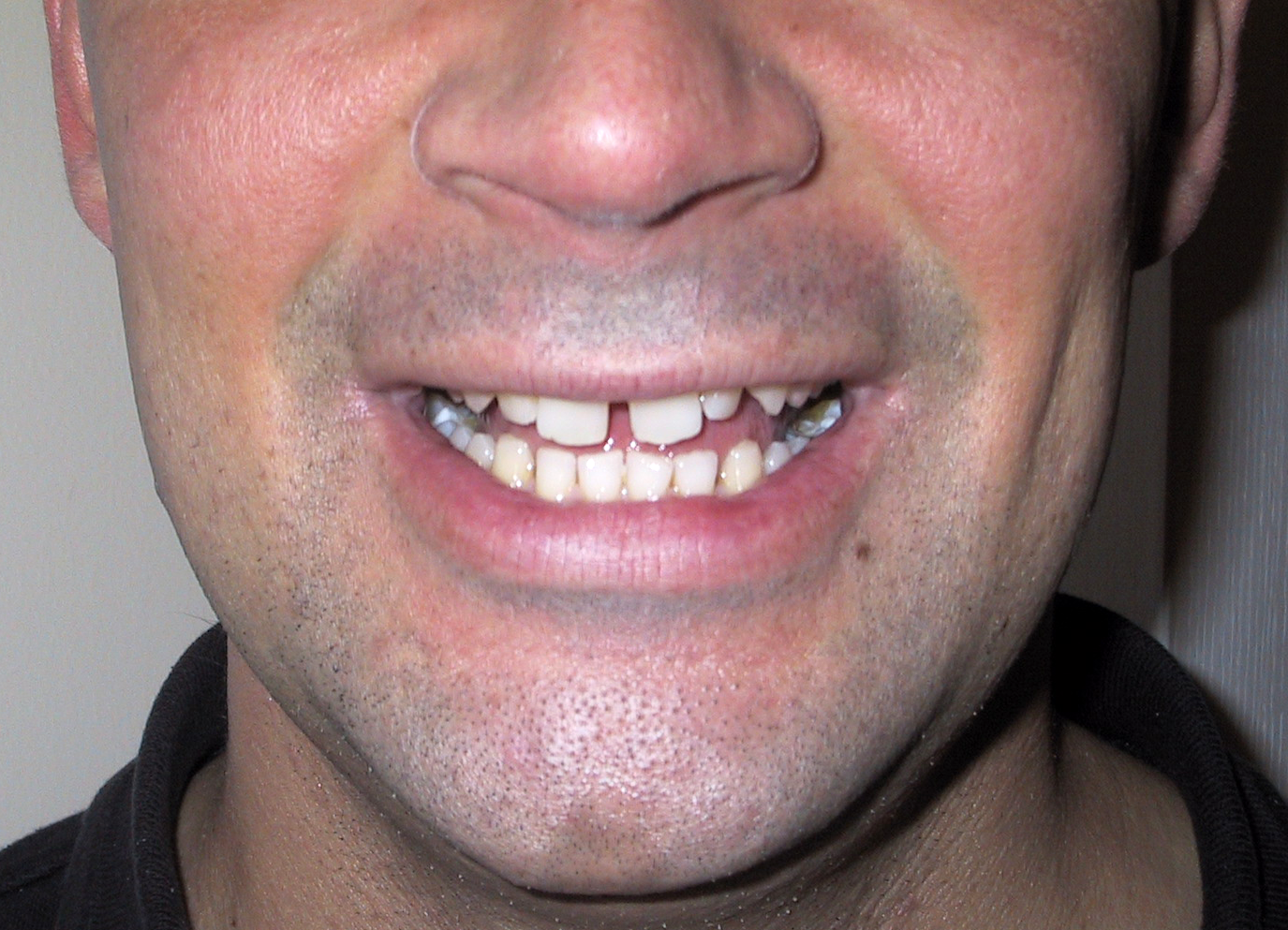
- Space between the two front teeth

Details

Identifiers
- Latin: diastema
- MeSH: D003970
- TA98: A05.1.03.078
- TA2: 904
- FMA: 77271

A diastema (pl.: diastemata, from Greek διάστημα, 'space') is a space or gap between two teeth. Many species of mammals have diastemata as a normal feature, most commonly between the incisors and molars. More colloquially, the condition may be referred to as gap teeth or tooth gap.

In humans, the term is most commonly applied to an open space between the upper incisors (front teeth). It happens when there is an unequal relationship between the size of the teeth and the jaw. Diastemata are common for children and can exist in adult teeth as well.

== In humans ==
=== Causes ===
1. Oversized Labial Frenulum: Diastema is sometimes caused or exacerbated by the action of a labial frenulum (the tissue connecting the lip to the gum), causing high mucosal attachment and less attached keratinized tissue. This is more prone to recession or by tongue thrusting, which can push the teeth apart.

2. Periodontal Disease: Periodontal disease, also known as gum disease, can result in bone loss that supports the teeth. If a person loses enough bone, the teeth can become loose and cause gaps to form.

3. Mesiodens: Mesiodens is an extra tooth that grows behind the front teeth. A mesiodens may push the front teeth apart to make room for itself thus creating a gap between the front teeth.

4. Skeletal discrepancy: Dental skeletal discrepancy can be a cause behind gap teeth. If the upper jaw grows more than the lower jaw, teeth on the upper jaw will have more space to cover thus leaving gaps between them.

5. Proclination: If the front teeth are angled forward, a small gap between them may appear large. This is called proclination; it may be a result of aggressive tongue thrusting.

=== Treatment ===
A diastema is not a pathology and doesn't require treatment. Any interventions to modify a diastema are purely cosmetic. Diastema is treated by determining and treating the cause. Treatment options can differ from one patient to another, but generally it is treated by orthodontics, composite fillings or a combination of veneers and crowns.

== Historical and popular culture references ==
In The Canterbury Tales, Geoffrey Chaucer wrote of the "gap-toothed wife of Bath". As early as this time period, the gap between the front teeth, especially in women, was associated with lustful characteristics. Thus, the implication in describing "the gap-toothed wife of Bath" is that she is a middle-aged woman with insatiable lust.

In Ghana, Namibia and Nigeria, as well as throughout many communities in Kenya, diastemata are regarded as being attractive and a sign of fertility, and some people have even had them created through cosmetic dentistry.

In France, they are called dents du bonheur (lucky/happiness teeth). This expression originated in Napoleon's time: when the Napoleonic army recruited, it was imperative that soldiers had incisors in perfect condition because they had to open the paper cartridges (containing gunpowder) with their teeth when loading their muskets. All those who had teeth apart were then classified as unfit to fight. Some men broke their own teeth to avoid going to war.

Les Blank's Gap-Toothed Women (1987) is a 30-minute documentary film about diastematic women.

=== Famous people ===
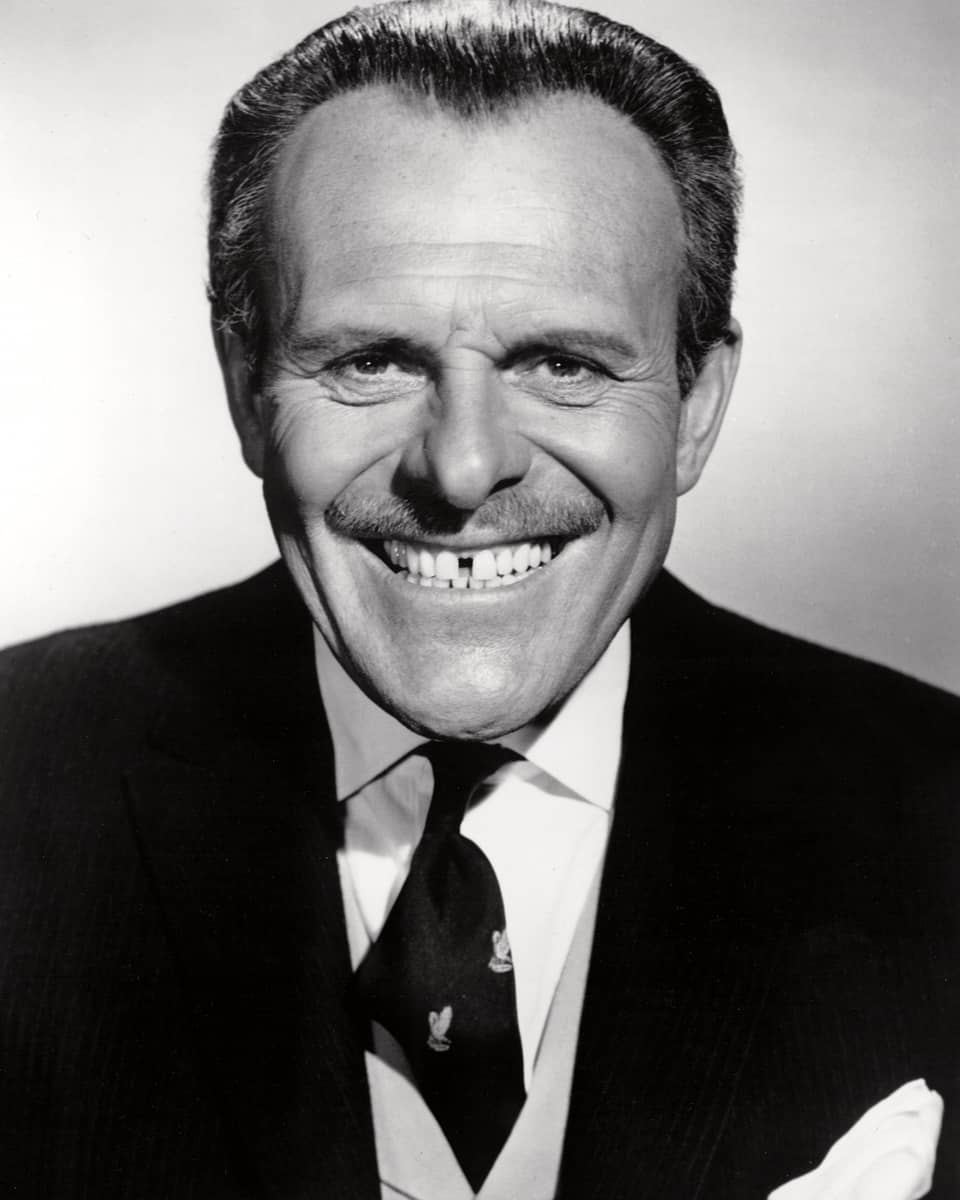
Actor Terry-Thomas was known for his 1/3-inch (8.5 mm) diastema.

Some well-known people noted for having diastema include:

- Musicians: Madonna, Elton John, Seal, Amy Winehouse, Mac DeMarco, 50 Cent, Flea, Elvis Costello, Charley Pride, Rex Orange County, Ray Davies of The Kinks, Billy Preston, Benjamin Zephaniah, Ray Dorset of Mungo Jerry, Dave Brockie a.k.a. Oderus Urungus and guitarist Corey Smoot a.k.a. Flattus Maximus, both of Gwar, Melanie Martinez, Becky G, Laura Pausini, Edmund Sylvers, Hayley Williams, Pharoahe Monch, guitarist Steve Howe, singer Bobby Brown and his late daughter Bobbi Kristina Brown, singer Tems, and Gracie Abrams.
- Models: Georgia May Jagger, Lauren Hutton, Lara Stone, Lily Aldridge, Slick Woods, Jessica Hart, and Lindsey Wixson.
- Actresses: Margaret Qualley, Uzo Aduba, Anna Paquin, Vanessa Paradis, Brigitte Bardot, Jorja Fox, Eve Myles, Léa Seydoux, Amira Casar, Cécile de France, Béatrice Dalle, Anna Popplewell, Octavia Spencer, Aubrey Plaza, Shannen Doherty and Aimee Lou Wood.
- Actors: Omar Sharif, Baz Ashmawy, Elijah Wood, Robert Morse, Eddie Murphy, Samuel L. Jackson, Woody Harrelson, Willem Dafoe, Zac Efron (before veneers) Laurence Fishburne, Denis Leary, Arnold Schwarzenegger, former late night TV show host David Letterman, Ernest Borgnine, Terry-Thomas, Clint Howard, Jemaine Clement, Keith 'Shebada' Ramsay, YouTuber Ross Scott, Vakhtang Kikabidze and antiques expert and TV personality Tim Wonnacott.
- Comedians: David Letterman, Jimmy Tarbuck, Paul F. Tompkins, Alan Carr, Alex Horne and Paul Scheer.
- News anchors: American television news reporter and anchor Michelle Charlesworth and New Zealand television news anchor and actress Angela D'Audney. Political news podcaster and former White House staffer Jon Favreau.
- Athletes: American football players Michael Strahan and Patrick Mahomes; American football coach Vince Lombardi; association football player Ronaldo; NBA Player Jeremy Sochan; boxer Mike Tyson; professional wrestler and former TNA World Heavyweight Champion Bobby Roode; Major League Baseball players Joe DiMaggio (closed) and Jimmy Rollins; French tennis player Yannick Noah; British Formula 1 World Champion Lewis Hamilton; Ukrainian boxer Oleksandr Usyk.
- Politicians and leaders: French president Emmanuel Macron, Haitian Revolutionary Toussaint Louverture, former U.S. Secretary of State Condoleezza Rice, former Supreme Court Justice Sandra Day O'Connor, American politicians Stacey Abrams and Chesa Boudin, British politicians Kemi Badenoch and Zack Polanski, and according to released photos, several of the children of Nicholas II of Russia.
- YouTubers: Thai-British anime reviewer Gigguk.

== Other sources ==
- Bell, Madison Smartt (2008) [2007]. Toussaint L'Ouverture: A Biography. New York: Vintage Books. ISBN 978-1400079353.
