= Gonzalo Giribet =

American invertebrate zoologist

- Born: September 2, 1970 (age 56); Burgos, Spain
- Education: University of Barcelona
- Awards: Guggenheim Fellow (2016)
- Scientific career
- Fields: Invertebrate zoology
- Workplaces: Harvard University

Gonzalo Giribet is a Spanish-American invertebrate zoologist and Alexander Agassiz Professor of zoology working on systematics and biogeography at the Museum of Comparative Zoology in Harvard University. He is a past president of the International Society for Invertebrate Morphology, of the Willi Hennig Society, and vice-president of the Sociedad Española de Malacología (Spanish Malacological Society).

== Early life ==
Giribet was born in Burgos and grew up in Vilanova i la Geltrú, Catalonia to a legal administrator and an engineer who worked in nuclear power plants. As a boy, he enjoyed windsurfing, beachcombing, and collecting sea shells. He attended, and then graduated from, the University of Barcelona in 1993, with bachelor's degrees in zoology and fundamental biology. He completed his doctorate in animal biology in 1997. He then moved to the American Museum of Natural History for postdoctoral research with Ward Wheeler, and from there moved to Harvard University in 2000, where he went through the ranks until becoming full professor in 2007, Alexander Agassiz Professor of Zoology in 2013, and Harvard College Professor in 2017.

== Career ==
Giribet is a Fellow of the Linnean Society of London; a Fellow of the California Academy of Sciences, San Francisco; a research associate at the American Museum of Natural History, New York; a research associate at the Field Museum of Natural History, Chicago; and an honorary research fellow at The Natural History Museum, London. Since 2014 he is Foreign Member of the biology section of the Institut d'Estudis Catalans, Barcelona. In 2017 Giribet received an honorary doctorate (Doctor honoris causa) from the University of Copenhagen.

=== Early career ===
In 1996, he and his Spanish colleagues discovered that arthropods are monophyletic and that tardigrades are their sister group. In the same year, he, with the same group of authors, suggested that metazoan species are polymorphistic after he studied flatworm groups such as Dugesia, Seriata, Tricladida and Turbellaria. In 1999, he proposed to include Cycliophora as a sister group of Syndermata.

=== Later career ===
In 2001, with his colleagues from Australian Museum studied the systematics of some Arthropoda species.

In 2002, he and Ward Wheeler suggested that the molluscan bivalve group Anomalodesmata should be classless, and that the orders Myoida and Veneroida are not monophyletic.

The same year, he, Gregory Edgecombe, and their colleagues studied the phylogenetics of harvestmen, Opiliones, using data from 18s and 28s rRNA genes and morphology. Based on these analyses, they proposed that Dyspnoi and Laniatores formed the clade Dyspnolaniatores, which should be used as new classification for Opiliones. His later studies corroborated instead the traditional clade Palpatores, formed by Eupnoi and Dyspnoi.

In 2006, he, along with Jon Mallatt, provided evidence that Branchiopoda not Malacostraca is the sister group of Hexapoda after studying ribosomal RNA in various phyla including Kinorhyncha and Ecdysozoa. The same year, he also participated at Harvard Museum of Natural History exhibit where he, Naomi Pierce, Brian D. Farrell, and E. O. Wilson showed species of whip scorpions and Sonoran Desert millipedes.

In 2007, he traveled to New Zealand for intensive sampling of daddy longlegs and other invertebrates. In August 2007, he traveled to Florida, where he demonstrated that mite harvestmen found there are relatives of West African species, because when the supercontinent Pangea broke up the North American part took some of those species with it.

In 2009, he discovered the origin and evolution of animal organ systems by studying such bilaterian groups as Acoela and Nemertodermatida, which also showed that Acoelomorpha is not a sister group to them. During the same study he also suggested that the genus Xenoturbella is not a part of Deuterostoma super phylum, and that the genus Symbion and the Deuterostomia actually belong to the Bryzoa and Entoprocta subphyla.

In 2009, he and his students traveled to West Africa particularly to Cameroon and Gabon, where they collected velvet worms to compare them to the species found in Central, South America, and the Caribbean.

In 2022, a research group led by him and Prashant P. Sharma, his former Ph.D. student, showed that Arachnida is not monophyletic, using a dataset of over 500 genome libraries and morphology. In that study, horseshoe crabs were placed inside the arachnids, which suggests a complex history of terrestrialization in Chelicerata and challenges the century-old dogma of a single colonization of land in arachnids.

In 2023, his laboratory produced the first complete genome sequence of Onychophora, commonly known as the velvet worms.

== Personal life ==
Giribet participates in various Windsurfing championships, including the Spanish National Championship, the European Championship, and the World Championship.

== Works ==
- Ricardo Pinto-da-Rocha; Glauco Machado; Gonzalo Giribet (2007). Harvestmen: The Biology of Opiliones. Harvard University Press. ISBN 978-0-674-02343-7.
- Rob DeSalle; Gonzalo Giribet (2002). Techniques in Molecular Systematics and Evolution (1st ed.). Birkhäuser. ISBN 978-3-7643-6257-7.
- Rob DeSalle; Gonzalo Giribet (2002). Ward Wheeler (ed.). Molecular Systematics and Evolution: Theory and Practice (1st ed.). Birkhäuser. ISBN 978-3-0348-9442-5.
