= Rhinobothriidae =

Scientific classification
- Kingdom: Animalia
- Phylum: Platyhelminthes
- Class: Cestoda
- Order: Rhinebothriidea
- Family: Rhinobothriidae

Family of flatworms

Rhinobothriidae is a family of flatworms belonging to the order Rhinebothriidea.

Genera:

- Rhinebothrium
- Rhinebothroides
- Rhodobothrium
- Scalithrium
