= Rhinebothriidea =

Scientific classification
- Kingdom: Animalia
- Phylum: Platyhelminthes
- Class: Cestoda
- Order: Rhinebothriidea

Families
- Anindobothriidae; Anthocephaliidae; Echeneibothriidae; Escherbothriidae; Rhinobothriidae

Order of flatworms

Rhinebothriidea is an order of Cestoda (tapeworms). Members of this order are gut parasites of stingrays.

== Named Species of Rhinebothrium ==
Out of the nine species of potamotrygonids, only five Rhinebothrium have been named;

1. R. copi-anullum from Paratrygon aiereba in Peru
2. R. paranaense from Potamotrygon falkneri in Paraguay
3. R. mistyae from P. motoro in Argentina
4. R. corbatai from P. motoro in Argentina
5. R. paratrygoni from P. falkneri in South America

More research is being done one the remaining four species of Rhinebothrium, but as of right now this is a lot of information as it is. From this we are able to use scientific and technological advancements to help the whole of the stingray population.
