= Gonopore =

Invertebrate genital pore

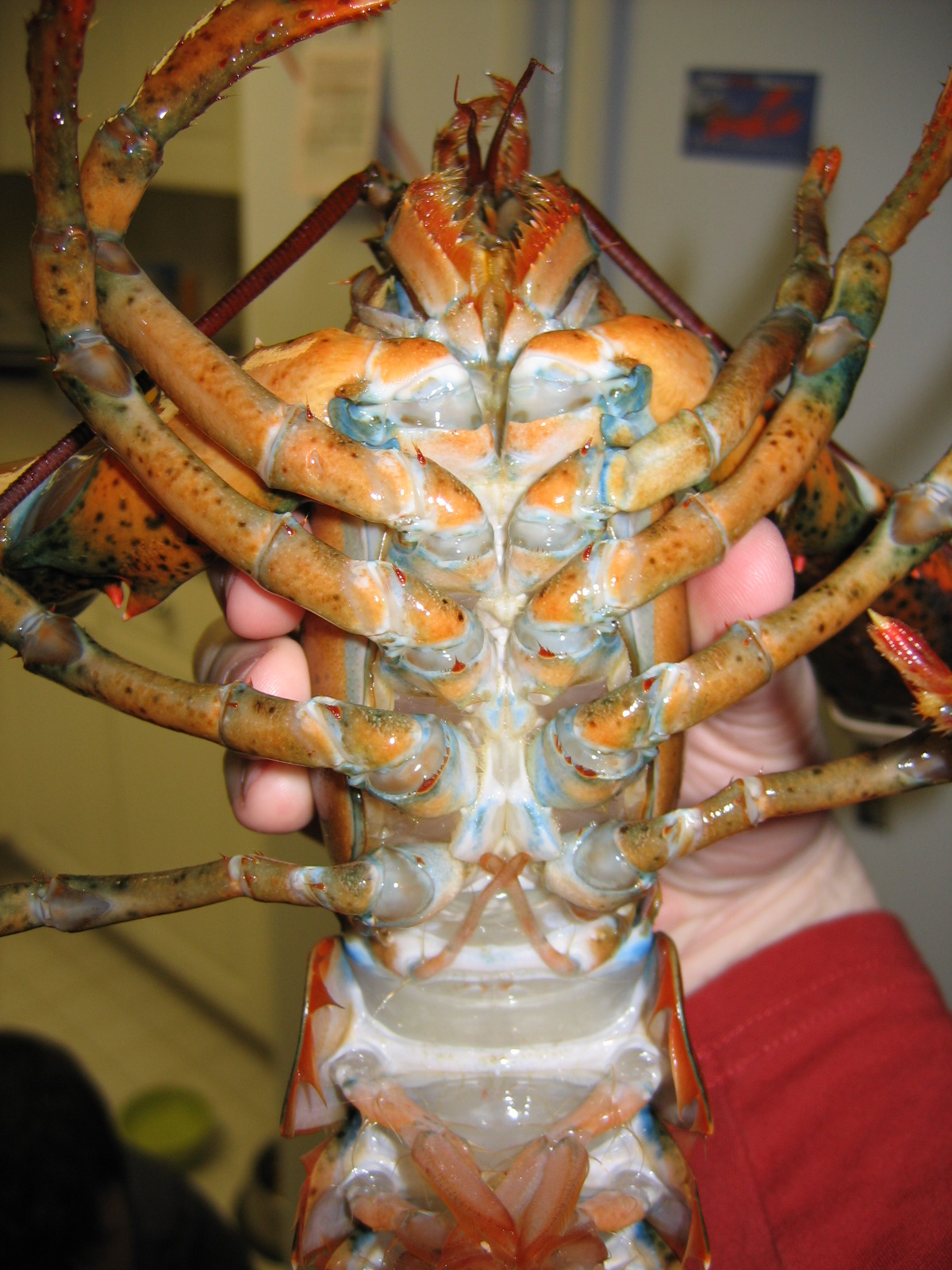
The ventral side (underside) of a female American lobster, a member of the class Malacostraca. The gonopores are at the bases of the third walking leg, pointing towards the animal's tail.

A gonopore, sometimes called a gonadopore, is a genital pore in many invertebrates. Hexapods, including insects, have a single common gonopore, except mayflies, which have a pair of gonopores. More specifically, in the unmodified female, it is the opening of the common oviduct, and in the male, it is the opening of the ejaculatory duct.

The position of the gonopore varies considerably between groups, but is generally constant within groups, allowing its position to be used as a "segmental marker". In Malacostraca, it is on the sixth thoracic segment; in Symphyla, it is on the fourth trunk segment; in arachnids, it is on the second segment of the opisthosoma. In insects and centipedes, the gonopores are close to the animal's tail, while in millipedes, they are on the third body segment behind the head, near the second pair of legs.

== See also ==
- Gonopod
- Gonopodium
