= Overland Track =

Hiking trail in Tasmania, Australia

The Overland Track
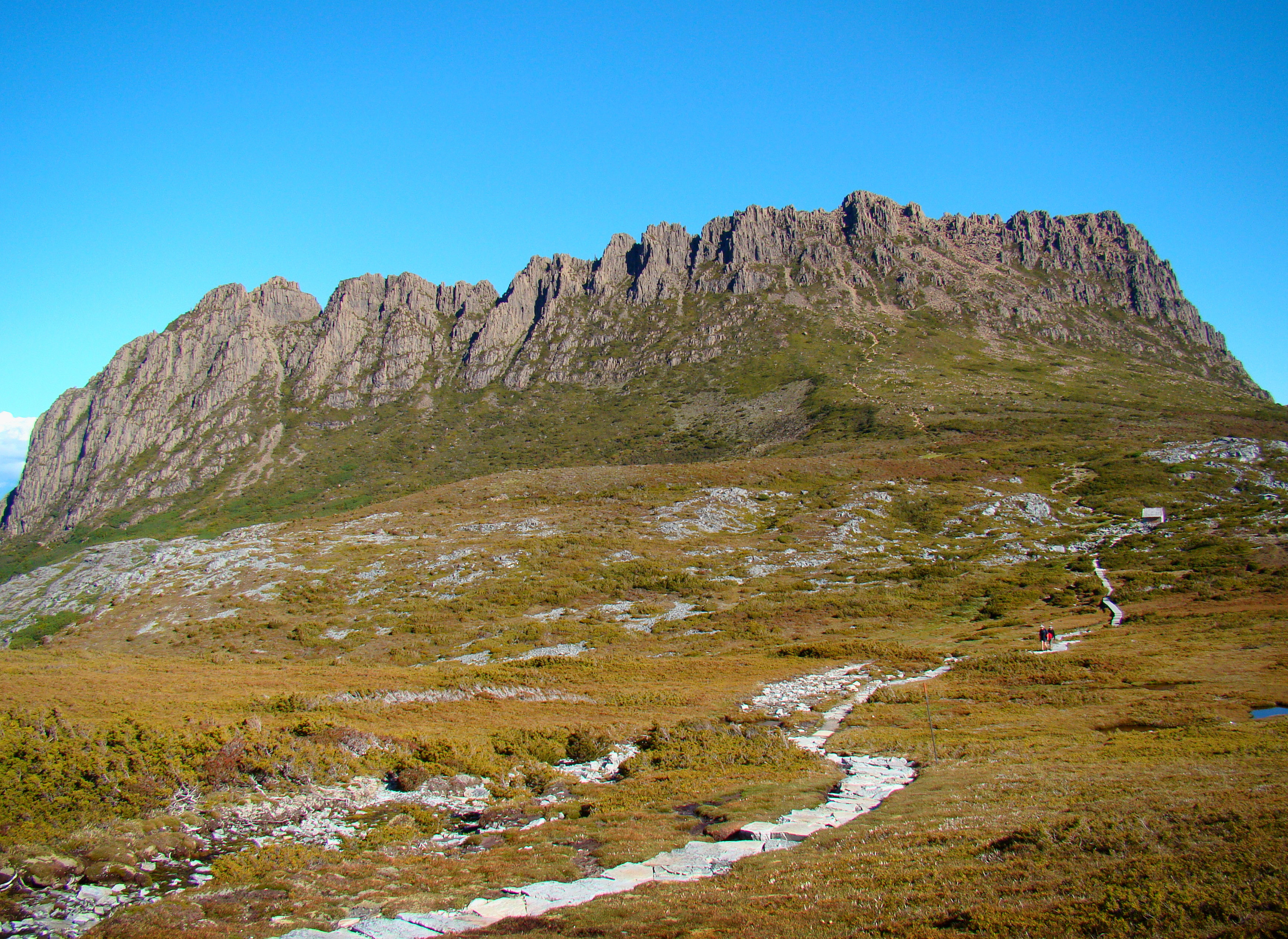
- Track passing by Kitchen Hut west of Cradle Mountain
- Length: 65 km (40 mi)
- Location: Cradle Mountain-Lake St Clair National Park, Tasmania, Australia
- Established: 1931–1935
- Designation: Cradle Mountain-Lake St Clair National Park; Tasmanian Wilderness World Heritage Area
- Trailheads: Ronny Creek (Cradle Mountain) 41°38′10″S 145°56′57″E; Cynthia Bay (Lake St Clair) 42°7′1″S 146°10′22″E
- Use: Hiking
- Highest point: Alpine plateau between Marions Lookout and Kitchen Hut, 1,250 m (4,100 ft)
- Lowest point: Forth River crossing, 720 m (2,360 ft)
- Difficulty: Medium
- Season: All
- Sights: Mountains, lakes, rivers, waterfalls, wildlife
- Hazards: Hypothermia, snakebites, cliffs

Map of The Overland Track
- The Overland Track, marked in red, with Cradle Mountain in the north and Lake St Clair in the south.

The Overland Track is an Australian bushwalking track, traversing Cradle Mountain-Lake St Clair National Park, within the Tasmanian Wilderness World Heritage Area. It is walked by more than nine thousand people each year, with numbers limited in the warmer months. Officially the track runs for 65 kilometres (40 mi) from Cradle Mountain to Lake St Clair however many choose to extend it by walking along Lake St Clair for an extra day, bringing it to 82 kilometres (51 mi). It winds through terrain ranging from glacial mountains, temperate rainforest, wild rivers and alpine plains.

There are several side tracks, including walks to the summits of Cradle Mountain and Mount Ossa, the tallest mountain in Tasmania, and a group of tarns called The Labyrinth. Known for its pristine environment and beauty, the Overland Track is listed by Lonely Planet as one of the best treks in the world.

The walk can be done independently, with six main public huts maintained by Tasmania Parks and Wildlife and five private huts for commercial groups only. Bushwalkers usually complete the track in five or six days, usually from north to south. The record time is seven hours and 25 minutes, achieved by Andy Kromar during the Cradle Mountain Run.

== History ==
=== Use by Aboriginal peoples ===
The Overland Track spans the boundary between the Big River and Northern Tasmanian Aboriginal nations and may have been used as an access route. Several artifacts and campsites containing various stone types and tools have been discovered between Pelion Plains and Lake St Clair, and early surveyors reported huts in the area. Aboriginal Tasmanians were persecuted by the European settlers upon their arrival, and the last free Aboriginals in the area were seen between Barn Bluff and Lake Windemere in 1836.

=== Early European development ===
Europeans first explored Cradle Mountain in 1827 and 1828 with Joseph Fossey and Henry Hellyer surveying for the Van Diemen's Land Company. Lake St Clair was sighted by surveyor William Sharland in 1832, with George Frankland leading an expedition to it three years later.

During the late 19th century there was an effort to build a railway to the west coast of Tasmania, which at the time was only accessible by boat. Railway engineer Allan Stewart began surveying a route which led up the Mersey Valley up to what is now the middle of the Overland Track, but ran out of money before it could be completed. Parts of his trail were used by the Innes track (est. 1897), which led to the mining town of Rosebery. The Overland Track itself follows the original Innes track across Pelion Plains.

These tracks encouraged prospecting, and several mines were set up including coal near Barn Bluff, copper in Pelion Plains, Lake Windemere and Commonwealth Creek, tin in Mount Inglis, and tungsten in the Forth Valley. Lake Windemere and Old Pelion huts were established during this mining effort.

Trappers worked in the area from the 1860s until the collapse of the fur trade in the 1950s, although hunting in the park was declared illegal after 1927. They established huts, including Du Cane and Pine Valley, and burned the land to encourage fresh growth and game.

During the same timeframe Pelion Plains was used by sheep and cattle for grazing in the summer, and wild cattle lived in the area until 1948. The cattle were reportedly quite aggressive, and known to attack early bushwalkers.

=== Environmental protection and tourism ===
Both Lake St Clair and Cradle Mountain were regarded by European settlers as beautiful tourist destinations, with tourist lodges at each location.

In the 1910s, Gustav and Kate Weindorfer began campaigning for the area from Cradle Mountain to Lake St Clair to be a national park. It was declared a scenic reserve in 1922, a wildlife reserve in 1927 and its current designation of national park from 1947. During this transition, former trappers began building huts and guiding bushwalkers, including Paddy Hartnett, Weindorfer and Bob Quaile.

It was not until 1931 that fur trapper Bert Nichols blazed the Overland Track, and by 1935 it was consolidated and used by independent walking parties.

By 1937, it was officially named the Overland Track and the track had been upgraded to be used for guided tours and pack horses. Shortly after, Kitchen Hut was built, now used as an emergency shelter.

In the 1970s, management of the park passed to the newly formed Tasmania Parks and Wildlife Service after the controversial flooding of Lake Pedder and commercially guided tours were reintroduced.

== Management ==
The Overland Track has been managed by Tasmanian Parks and Wildlife Service since 1971, with the purpose of both improving access, and conserving World Heritage areas. They manage track maintenance, hut maintenance and upgrades, toilet waste removal and staff rangers along the track during the summer.

During their tenure the popularity of the track increased dramatically, with the number of walkers increased from 1500 to 8800 between 1971 and 2004. The demographics also shifted away from being mostly locals to 35% international, 57% from the mainland, and 8% from Tasmania. In 2005 a booking system was implemented to manage its increased popularity, and restrictions were placed on walkers. In 2024 it costs $295 AUD for an adult to walk the track from October to May (inclusive), not including the National Parks Pass, and walkers must travel from north to south on a prebooked starting date.

=== Erosion ===
The track was in poor condition by the 1980s with significant mud and erosion, with 29% of the track impacted by knee-deep mud and track widening. In 1982, major Tasmanian national parks were recognised as a World Heritage Area, and federal funding was allocated to hut and track upgrades. This consisted of duckboarding vulnerable parts of the track.

In 2015, the track condition was judged to be in vastly improved condition with only 4% considered "poor". The track is now free from erosion.

== Hazards ==
Highland Tasmanian weather can be unpredictable and cause hazardous track conditions, however most injuries and deaths from 1990 can be attributed to slips.

In 2014 an international student from Victoria died from hypothermia between Kitchen Hut and Waterfall Valley due to inclement weather and inadequate clothing. It led to stricter guidelines for bushwalker preparedness, and Chinese language information at trailheads.

== Climate ==
The climate is generally unstable, with temperatures ranging from hot (in excess of 35 °C or 95 °F) in summer to below 0 °C (32 °F) in winter. Snow can fall at any time and is common during the winter, especially on the Cradle Mountain plateau and around Mount Ossa. Rain is very common, sometimes torrential though often settling to days of drizzle. Additionally, the climate varies significantly between Cradle Mountain and Lake St Clair, with Cradle Mountain subject to almost twice as much annual rainfall despite having the same number of rainy days. This informed the practice (now policy) of bushwalkers departing from the north.

Climate data for Cradle Valley, Tasmania
Month	Jan	Feb	Mar	Apr	May	Jun	Jul	Aug	Sep	Oct	Nov	Dec	Year
Record high °C (°F)	30.0 (86.0)	30.5 (86.9)	25.1 (77.2)	20.0 (68.0)	17.8 (64.0)	11.1 (52.0)	11.5 (52.7)	12.7 (54.9)	17.9 (64.2)	19.9 (67.8)	22.0 (71.6)	27.0 (80.6)	30.5 (86.9)
Mean daily maximum °C (°F)	16.6 (61.9)	17.0 (62.6)	14.4 (57.9)	10.8 (51.4)	7.9 (46.2)	5.1 (41.2)	4.6 (40.3)	4.9 (40.8)	7.5 (45.5)	10.5 (50.9)	12.8 (55.0)	15.2 (59.4)	10.6 (51.1)
Mean daily minimum °C (°F)	5.2 (41.4)	5.9 (42.6)	4.7 (40.5)	3.1 (37.6)	1.5 (34.7)	−0.2 (31.6)	−0.2 (31.6)	−0.5 (31.1)	0.3 (32.5)	1.5 (34.7)	2.5 (36.5)	4.1 (39.4)	2.3 (36.1)
Record low °C (°F)	−1.0 (30.2)	−1.9 (28.6)	−2.5 (27.5)	−4.0 (24.8)	−8.3 (17.1)	−8.3 (17.1)	−7.8 (18.0)	−8.5 (16.7)	−8.0 (17.6)	−5.0 (23.0)	−3.5 (25.7)	−1.3 (29.7)	−8.5 (16.7)
Average rainfall mm (inches)	148.8 (5.86)	121.9 (4.80)	148.1 (5.83)	204.1 (8.04)	276.4 (10.88)	272.3 (10.72)	315.7 (12.43)	301.7 (11.88)	269.4 (10.61)	252.4 (9.94)	205.1 (8.07)	181.7 (7.15)	2,815.8 (110.86)
Source: Bureau of Meteorology

Climate data for Lake St. Clair National Park, Tasmania
Month	Jan	Feb	Mar	Apr	May	Jun	Jul	Aug	Sep	Oct	Nov	Dec	Year
Record high °C (°F)	33.0 (91.4)	31.9 (89.4)	30.2 (86.4)	23.2 (73.8)	21.7 (71.1)	14.2 (57.6)	13.1 (55.6)	17.0 (62.6)	20.4 (68.7)	25.7 (78.3)	28.0 (82.4)	32.6 (90.7)	33.0 (91.4)
Mean daily maximum °C (°F)	19.3 (66.7)	19.2 (66.6)	16.6 (61.9)	13.0 (55.4)	10.3 (50.5)	7.7 (45.9)	7.3 (45.1)	8.2 (46.8)	10.0 (50.0)	12.6 (54.7)	15.5 (59.9)	17.3 (63.1)	13.1 (55.6)
Mean daily minimum °C (°F)	6.3 (43.3)	5.9 (42.6)	4.2 (39.6)	2.8 (37.0)	1.6 (34.9)	0.2 (32.4)	−0.1 (31.8)	0.3 (32.5)	0.9 (33.6)	2.0 (35.6)	3.6 (38.5)	5.0 (41.0)	2.8 (37.0)
Record low °C (°F)	−2.5 (27.5)	−4.0 (24.8)	−4.1 (24.6)	−5.0 (23.0)	−6.0 (21.2)	−7.0 (19.4)	−7.2 (19.0)	−7.0 (19.4)	−6.2 (20.8)	−6.5 (20.3)	−4.0 (24.8)	−2.6 (27.3)	−7.2 (19.0)
Average rainfall mm (inches)	101.7 (4.00)	83.6 (3.29)	107.1 (4.22)	135.0 (5.31)	157.1 (6.19)	172.8 (6.80)	205.3 (8.08)	247.6 (9.75)	217.2 (8.55)	175.2 (6.90)	136.2 (5.36)	130.8 (5.15)	1,868.3 (73.56)
Source: Bureau of Meteorology

== Flora and fauna ==
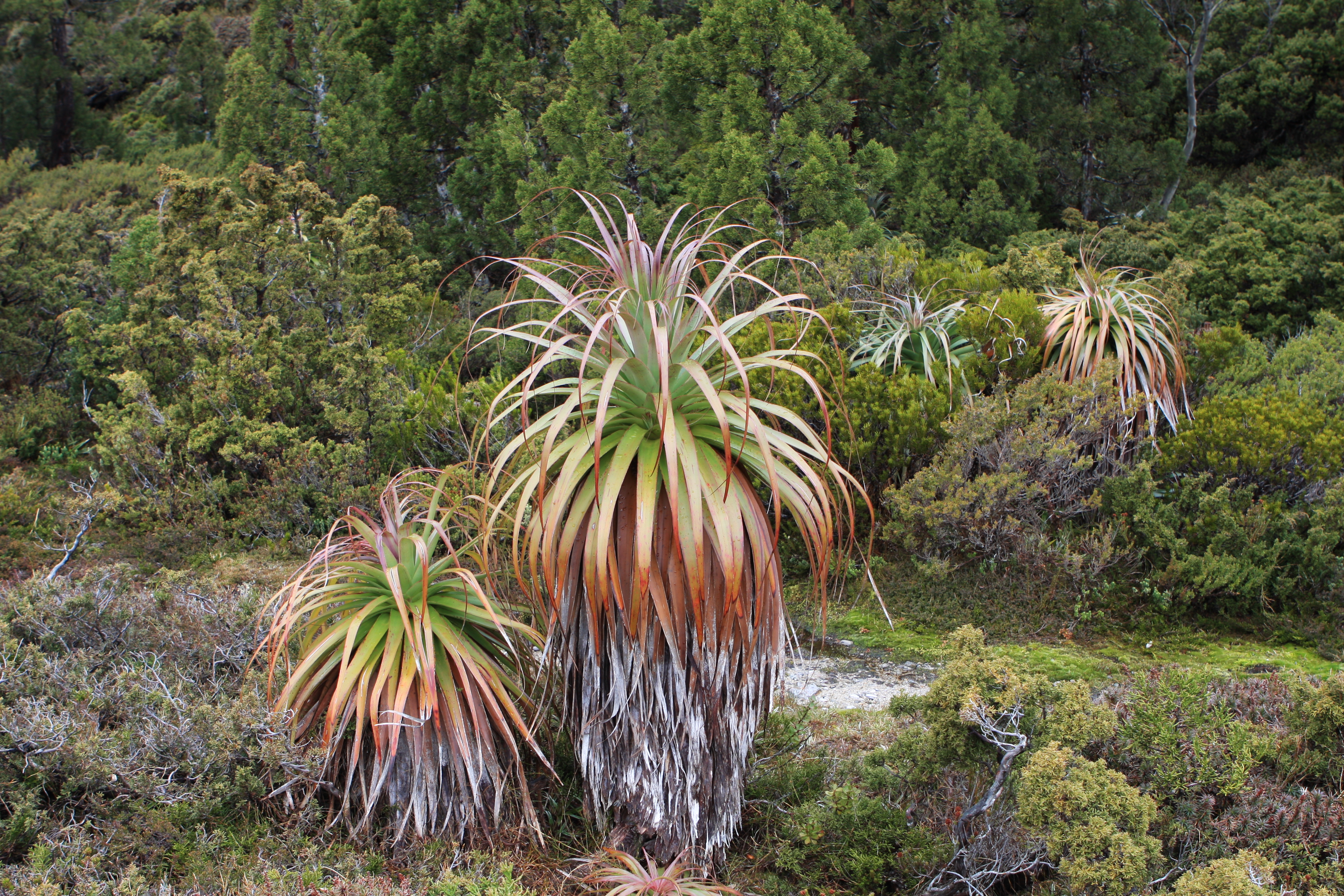
A pandani near Cradle Mountain, a Gondwanan species endemic to Tasmania

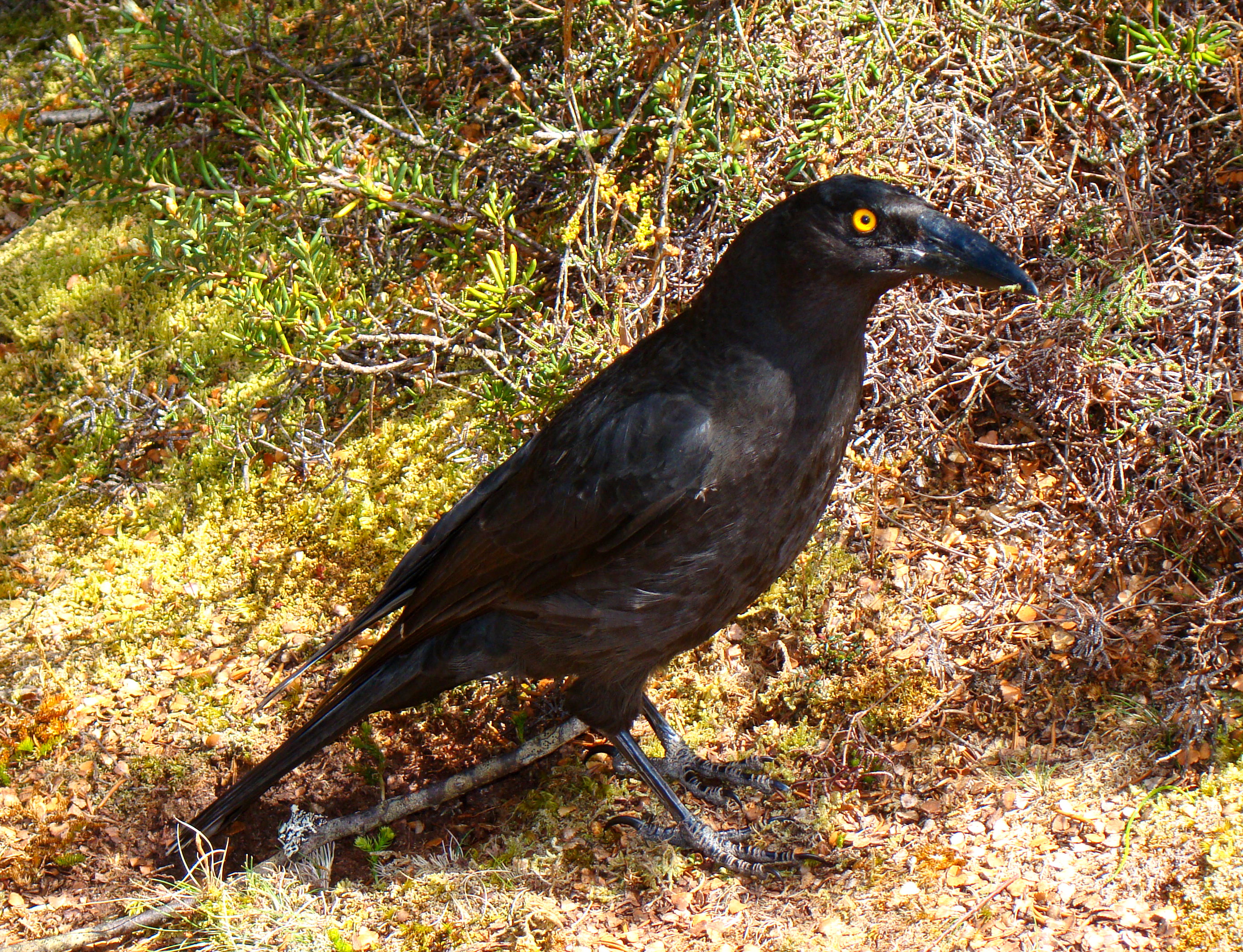
Currawong near Windermere

The Overland Track traverses Cradle Mountain-Lake St Clair National Park, which is a significant habitat for Tasmania's endemic species. An estimated 40–55% of the parks documented alpine flora is endemic. Furthermore, 68% of the higher rainforest species recorded in alpine areas in Tasmania are present in the Cradle Mountain-Lake St Clair National Park. The park's alpine vegetation is very diverse and has largely escaped forest fires that have caused neighbouring regions to suffer.

The most common fauna are Tasmanian pademelons (native), possums and small rodents, most of which are native. Also present, but not necessarily seen, are quolls, echidnas, Tasmanian devils and wombats. There are also Tasmanian leeches. The track traverses areas of many types of vegetation, including myrtle beech forest, Eucalypts forest, buttongrass plains, alpine herb fields, and shrubs and mosses.

=== Birds ===
The park has been identified as an Important Bird Area (IBA) because it provides habitat for 11 of Tasmania's endemic bird species, as well as for the flame and pink robins and the striated fieldwren. The IBA is important as a representative protected area in north-central Tasmania for those species.

=== Buttongrass plains ===
Large segments of the track pass across buttongrass plains, a landscape that is unique to Tasmania. It has been theorised that the extent of buttongrass plains could be due to Aboriginal fire-stick farming before European settlement.

=== Human interactions with wildlife ===
Some wildlife, especially possums, currawongs and quolls have become to associate humans with food and are quite adept at stealing from tents, huts and packs. Although the vast majority of people are against feeding wildlife, during a Tasmanian study 7.4% of people eating lunch in national parks were observed to feed animals, in addition to currawongs scavenging food after they left. It is recommended that bushwalkers suspend food from the roof within huts, and store food in rigid containers inside tents as eating human food has caused lumpy jaw in wildlife.

== Geology ==
The oldest rocks in Cradle Mountain-Lake St Clair National Park are quartzites laid down in Precambrian times, and form a large base tilted towards the SSW and most exposed in the northern half of the track. Later, there was some mineralisation forming tin and copper deposits, and in the Permian era marine deposits left shellfish fossils and sedimentary layered cliffs at about 900m.

In the Jurassic period, dolerite intruded through the crust, forming columns that cap every major mountain range in the national park.

North-south valleys were formed as Gondwana broke up, and they were further carved and deepened by glaciers during the last ice age. Cirque glaciers formed around most major peaks, giving Cradle Mountain its iconic shape.

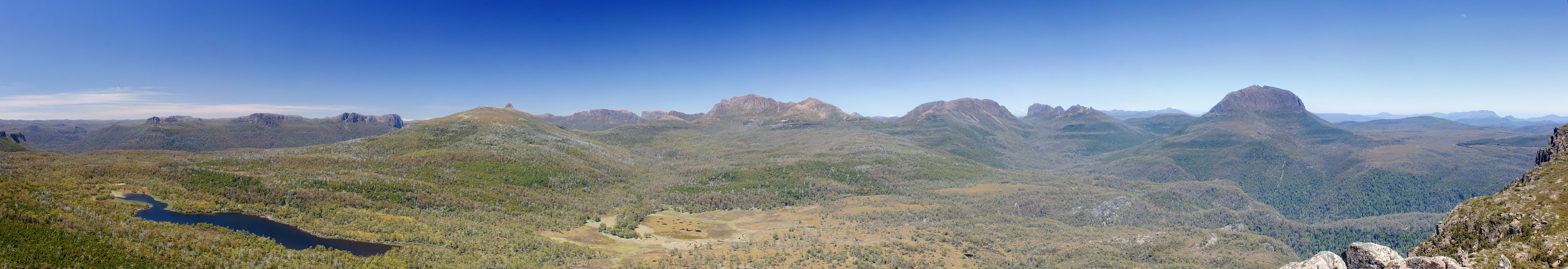
The Pelion Range from Mt Oakleigh showing the dolerite capped landscape

== Sights ==
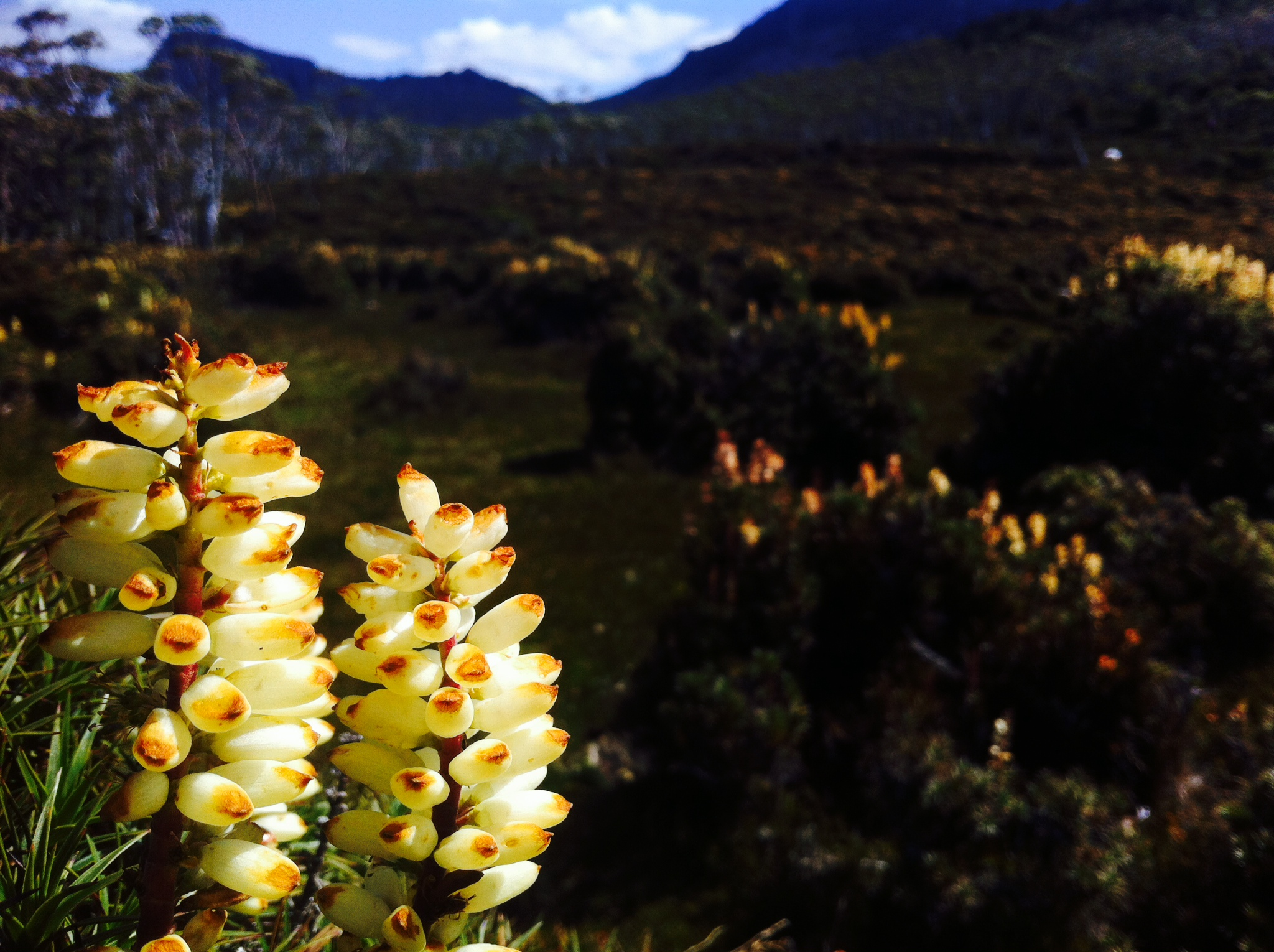
Scorparia is a common plant that lines the trail

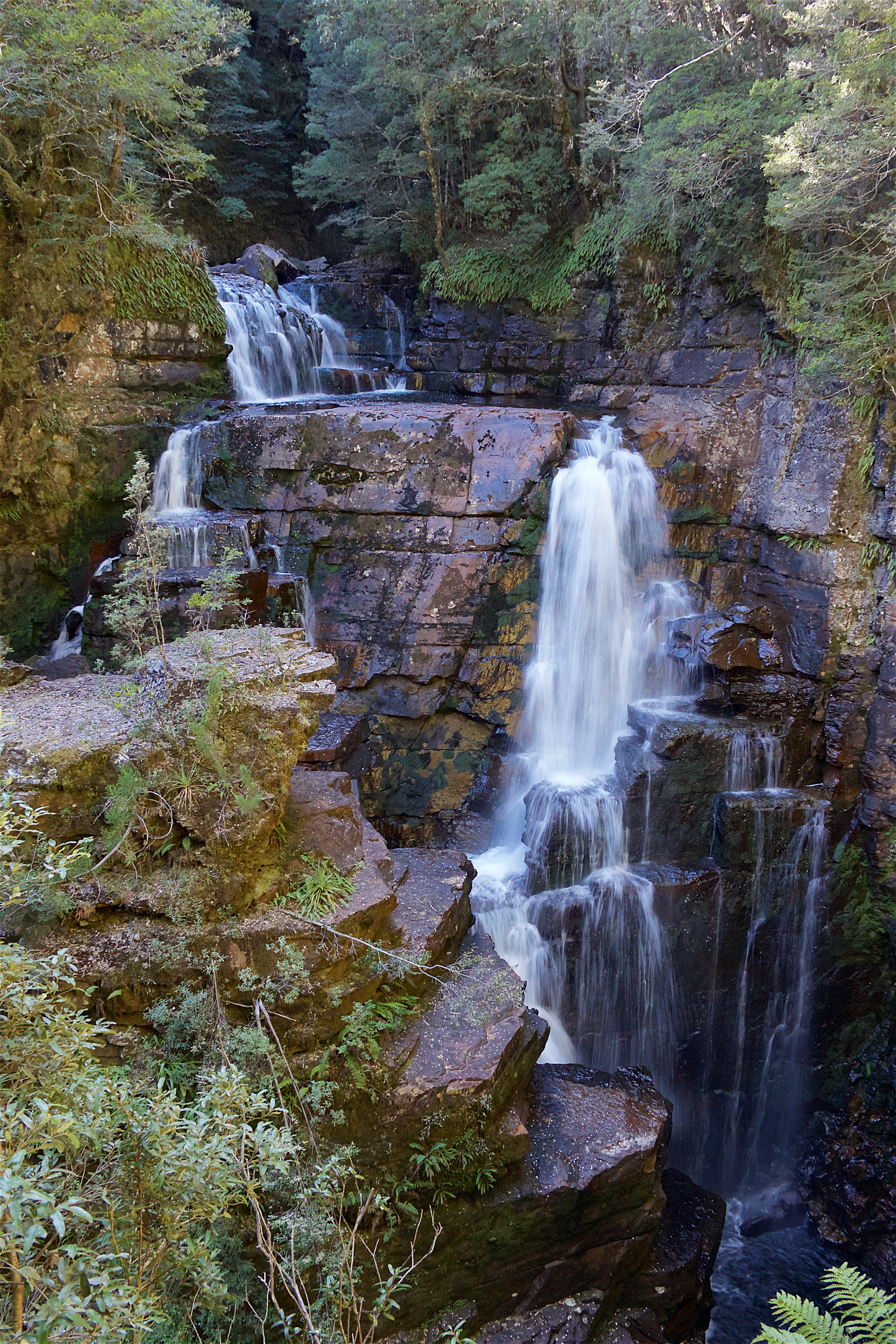
D'Alton Falls

The Overland Track is listed as one of the best treks in the world by Lonely Planet and contains "craggy mountains [and] beautiful lakes and tarns". The scenery is often described as spectacular, with walkers noting the mountain scenery, forests, alpine plains, lakes and waterfalls. Tasmania in general is known for its remote, interesting and challenging wilderness, and in bushwalking circles the Overland Track is considered a comparatively accessible way of experiencing this part of the world.

- Lakes
  - Lake St Clair
  - Lake Will
  - Lake Windermere
  - Dove Lake
- Mountains
  - Cradle Mountain
  - Barn Bluff
  - Mount Ossa
  - Mount Pelion East
  - Mount Pelion West
  - The Acropolis
  - Mount Rufus
- Waterfalls
  - Hartnett Falls
  - Ferguson Falls
  - D'alton Falls

== Walking route ==
The walk covers 65 kilometres (40 mi), with most walkers covering approximately 12 kilometres (7.5 mi) per day and staying over nights in and around the main huts. Public huts have room for 16-36 people, and there are numerous platformed tent sites around the areas. There are also private huts for guided tours.

The track is mostly well defined and adequately marked. The track condition, however, varies greatly. There are long sections of duckboard (boardwalk), which consist of split logs embedded in the ground, held together with wire and nails. Where there is no duckboard, the conditions can sometimes be very muddy. In winter, the mud is frozen solid early in the morning, however offsetting this is the problem of slippery ice on the duckboard. The mud is not nearly as frequent or deep as hikes in the southwest, due mainly to the duckboard.

Inexperienced walkers are advised to undertake the walk in summer when the days are longer and the weather milder. During this time the number of visitors is controlled by the "Overland Pass" a limited number of which are available, with revenue going towards maintaining the track. Visitors must walk from the north to south. The walk is not challenging provided that walkers are adequately prepared with proper equipment. The track is covered by the Tasmap Cradle Mountain – Lake St Clair 1:100000 map.

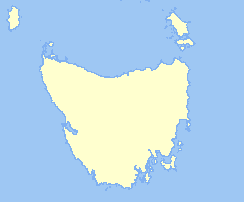
Location in Tasmania

=== Main track ===
The main track crosses starts from Ronny Creek (or Dove Lake) and crosses the Cradle Mountain plateau to reach Waterfall Valley. It then descends across heathlands to Lake Windermere and through rainforests to cross the Forth River at Frog Flats, before ascending to Pelion Plains. The track crosses the saddle between Mount Ossa and Mount Pelion East, and descends toward Kia Ora Hut. The next section crosses into the Du Cane Range, formed by cirque glaciers and surrounded by several waterfalls, then descends to cross the Narcissus River and meets the north side of Lake St Clair. From here, walkers either catch the ferry across the lake, or walk the 17 km to Cynthia Bay.

=== Side tracks ===
There are a number of side trips that can be undertaken while on the Overland Track. From north to south these are:

- Cradle Mountain Summit – 2 km, 2–3 hours return
- Barn Bluff – 7 km, 3–4 hours return
- Lake Will – 3 km, 1 hour return
- Mount Pelion West – 6 km, 5–6 hours return
- Old Pelion Hut (with swimming hole) – 1 km, 25 minutes return
- Mount Oakleigh – 8 km, 4–5 hours return
- Mount Ossa – 6 km, 3.5–4.5 hours return
- Mount Pelion East
- Pine Valley, Tasmania
  - The Acropolis
  - The Labyrinth
- Ferguson Falls and D'alton Falls – 1 km, 1-1.5 hours return
- Hartnett Falls – 1.5 km, 1 hour return
- Mount Rufus

== Huts ==
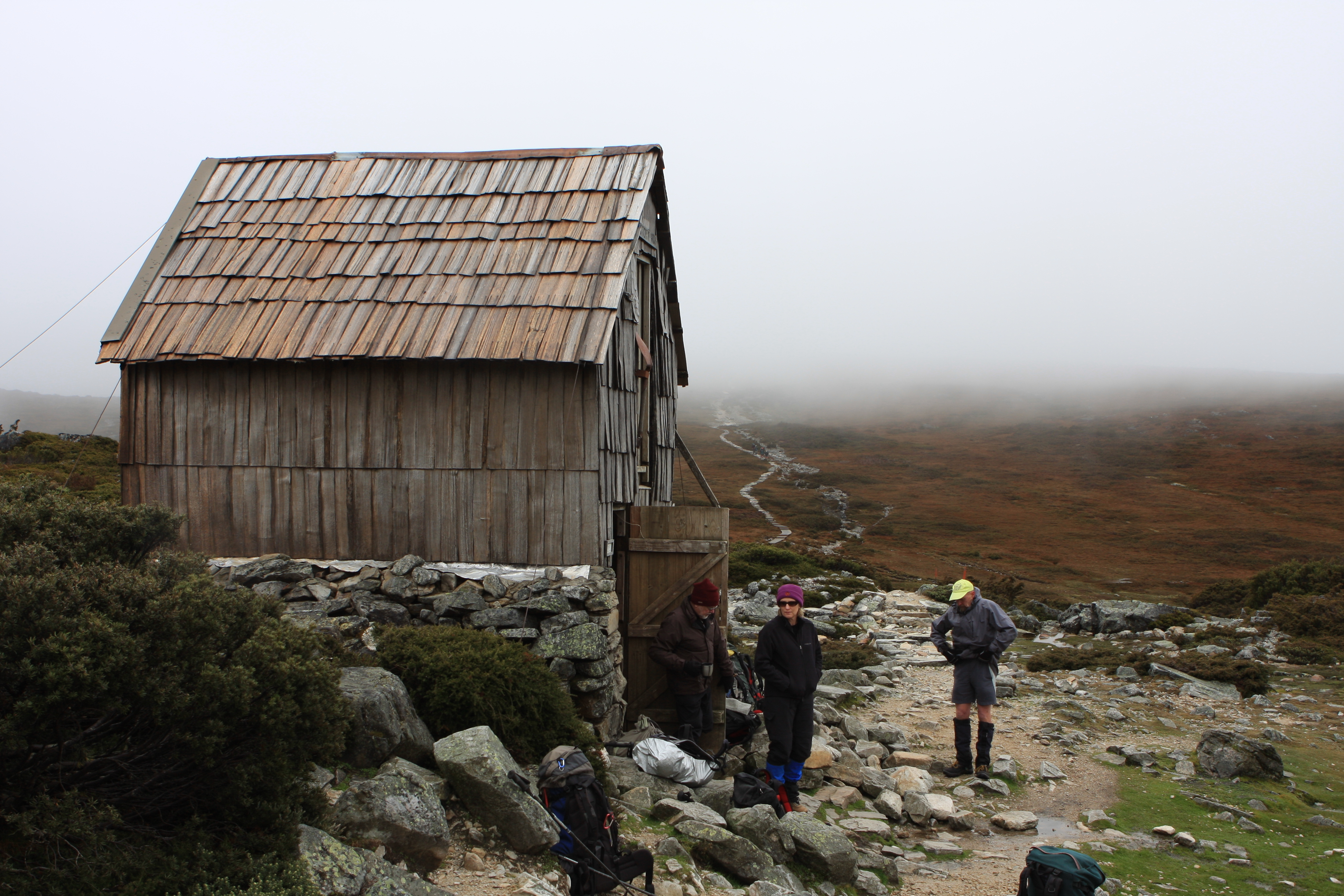
Kitchen Hut

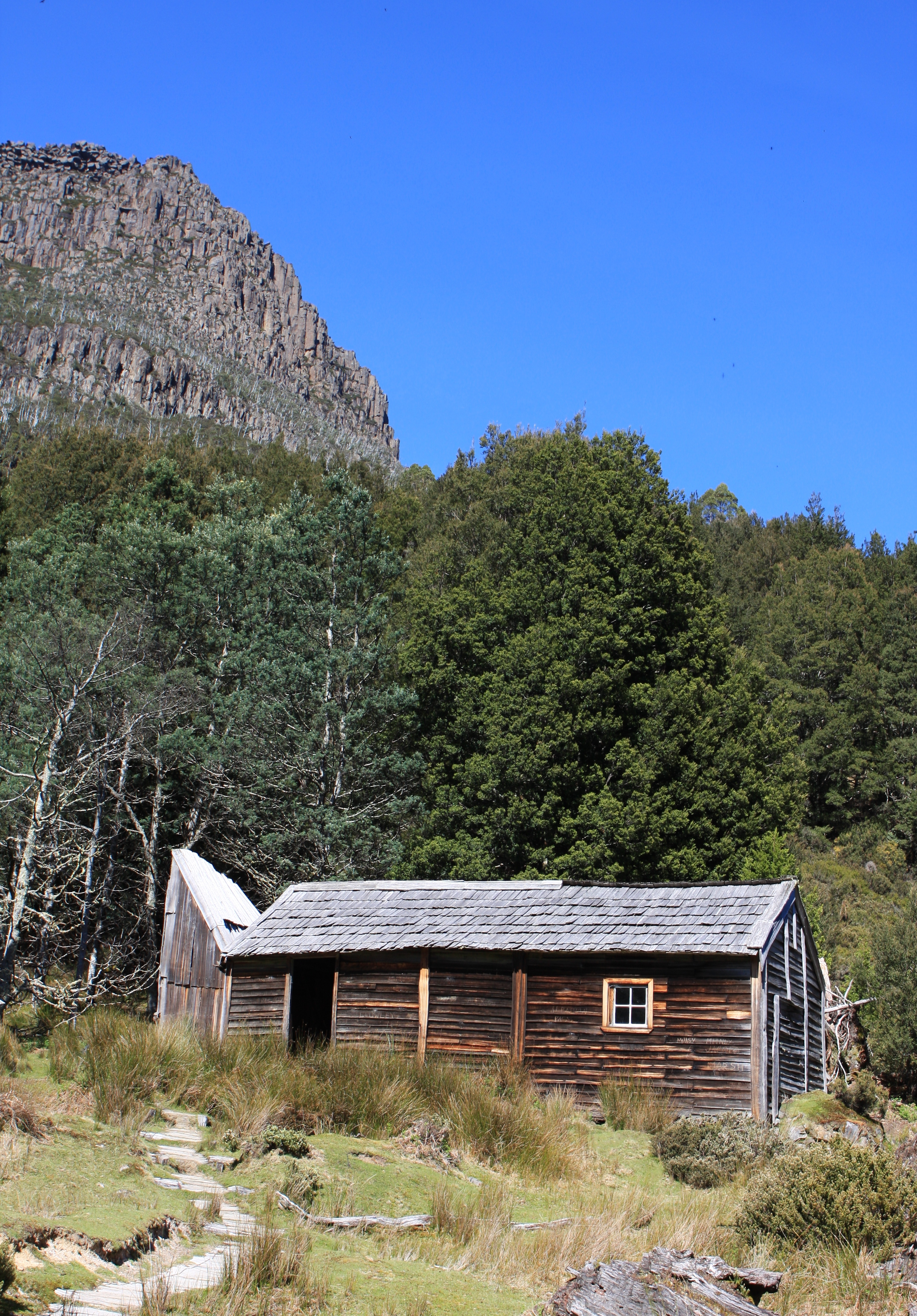
Du Cane Hut

The track has many huts, enabling hikers to stay indoors every night. There is no booking system for huts, so it is mandatory for hikers to carry a tent in case there is no space available or there is an incident on the track. Commercial groups are not encouraged to use the huts overnight and while one company operates from a set of five private huts, all other operators use the designated group camping areas near each of the main huts.

=== Main trail huts ===
Name	Location
Waterfall Valley Hut	41°42′53″S 145°56′49″E
Windermere Hut	41°46′18″S 145°57′23″E
New Pelion Hut	41°49′46″S 146°2′47″E
Kia Ora Hut	41°53′32″S 146°4′53″E
Bert Nichols Hut	41°55′56″S 146°5′20″E
Narcissus Hut	42°0′45″S 146°6′6″E
Echo Point Hut	42°2′37″S 146°8′17″E

=== Side route huts ===
Name	Location
Pine Valley Hut	41°57′31″S 146°3′48″E
Scott-Kilvert Memorial Hut	41°41′33″S 145°57′56″E

=== Day use and emergency shelters ===
Overnight use of these is prohibited except in an emergency.

Name	Location
Kitchen Hut	41°40′32.7″S 145°56′46″E
Rangers Hut	41°40′21″S 145°57′56″E
Du Cane Hut	41°54′17″S 146°6′8″E
Old Pelion Hut	41°49′34″S 146°2′9″E

== Cradle Mountain Run ==
The Cradle Mountain Run is an 82 km long Australian ultramarathon that follows the Overland Track. It is Australia's oldest endurance race and has run annually from 1980. Entrance is highly controlled due to environmental concerns.

The men's race record of 7:25 is held by Andy Kromar and the women's race record of 8:13 is held by Hanny Allston.

== See also ==
- Three capes track - a 3-day "dry boots" track
- South Coast Track - a remote/difficult 7-day bushwalk
- Port Davey Track - a remote/difficult 5-day bushwalk
