= Waterfall Valley Hut =

Alpine hut in Central Highlands, Tasmania

- Interactive map of the Waterfall Valley Hut area

General information
- Coordinates: 41°42′53″S 145°56′49″E

Waterfall Valley Hut is located in the Cradle Mountain National Park, Tasmania, Australia. It is the most northerly of six overnight huts located along the Overland Track. The current rendition of the hut was opened in 2020. It sleeps up to 34 people across three different rooms. There is also a fourth room which houses tables and bench seats for cooking and eating, and a wet area for leaving gear. It is heated by a small gas heater.

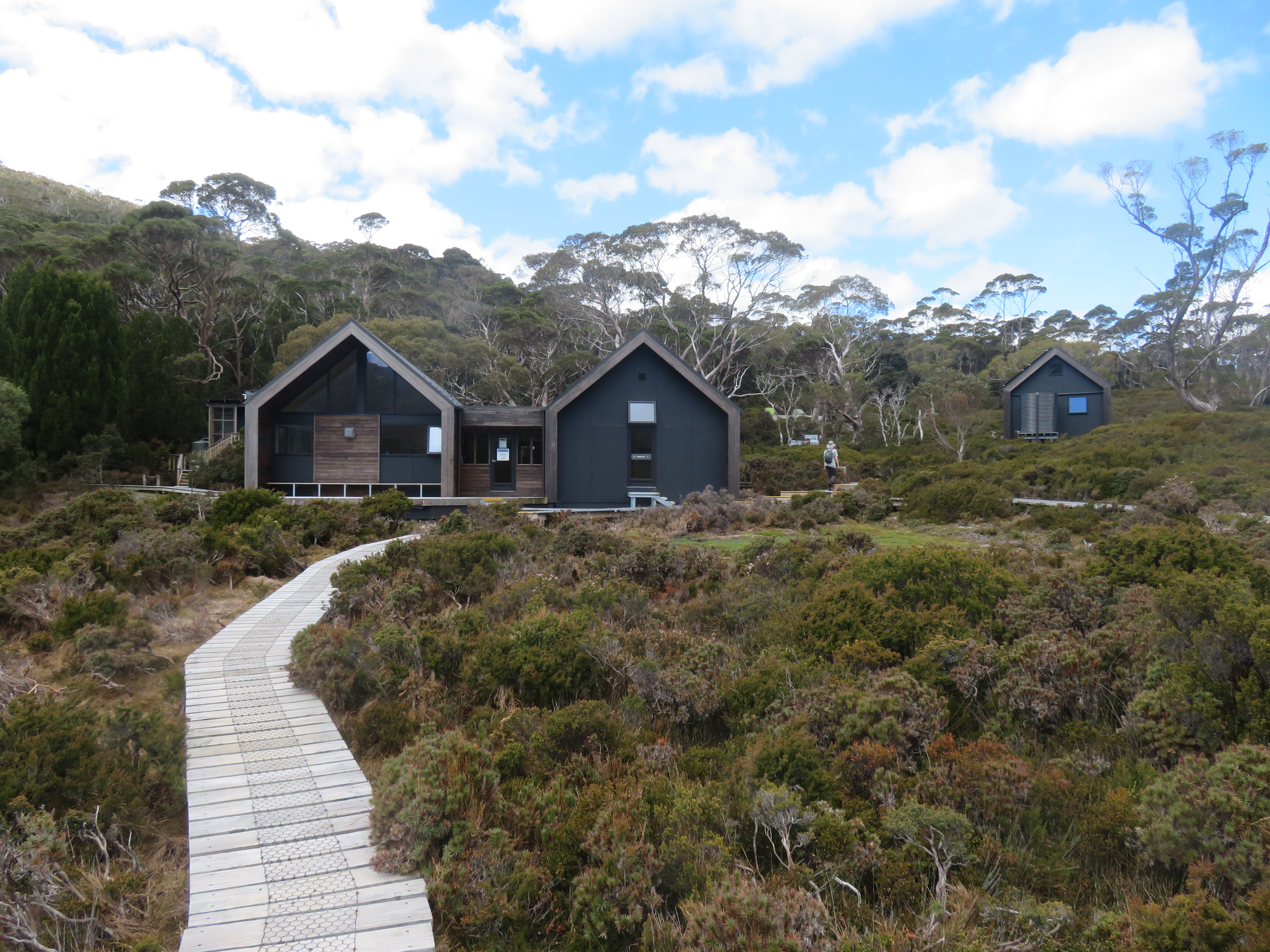
Waterfall Valley Hut looking north

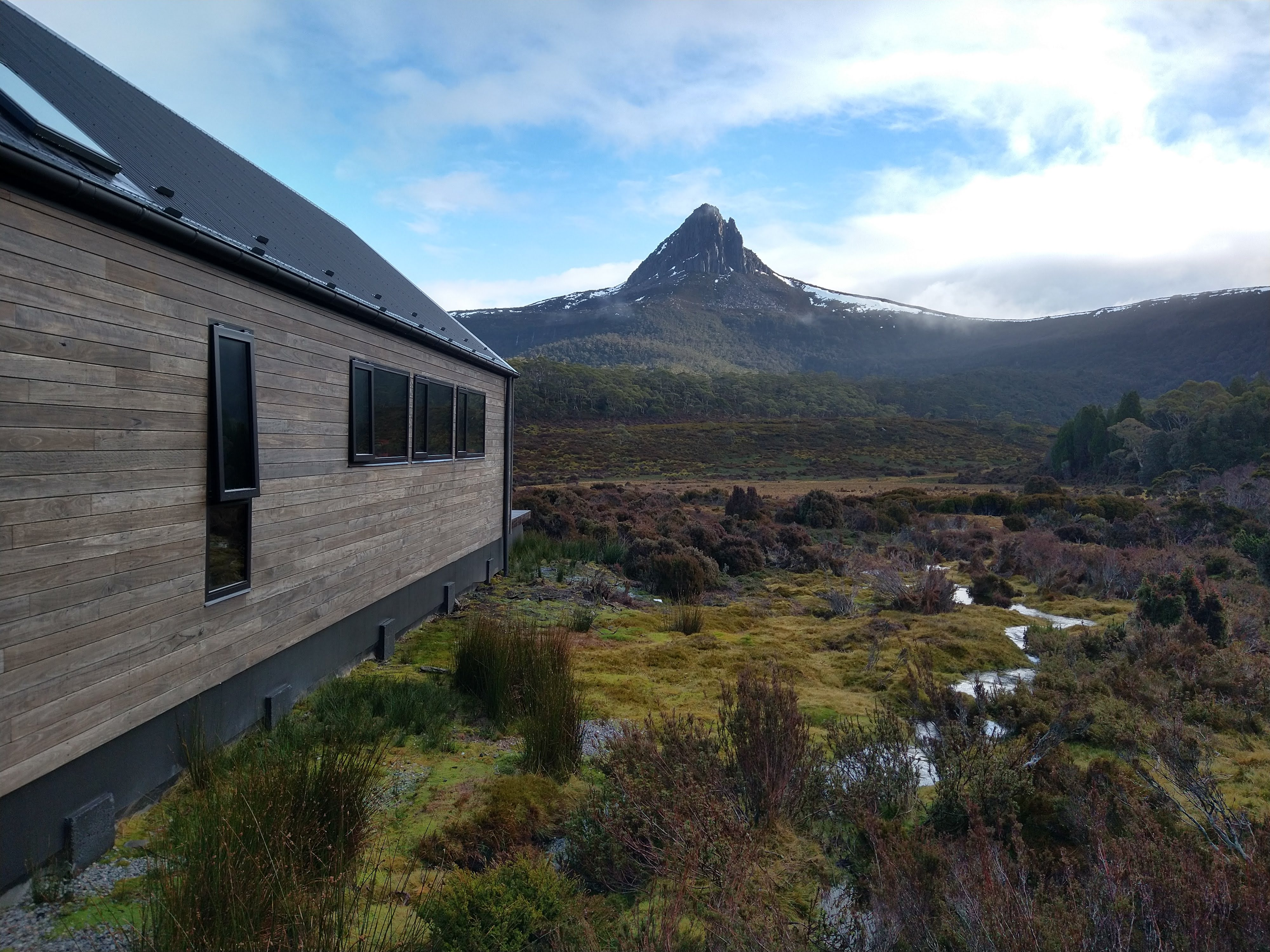
Looking at Barn Bluff from Waterfall Valley Hut, 2022

== Facilities ==
Waterfall Valley Hut has similar facilities to most of the other huts on the Overland Track, including bunks (without mattresses), tables & bench seats, new 'Zero Discharge' Sputnik toilets, rainwater tank, tent platforms, group campsite, a helipad (for emergency and maintenance use only), a gas heater, and a Ranger's Quarters. During summer, a volunteer Hut Warden will also be on site to provide information and assistance to walkers.

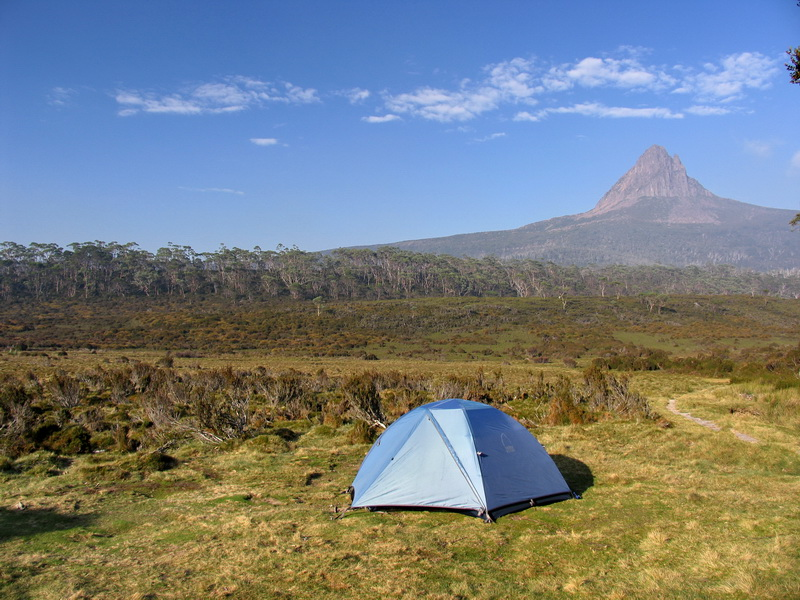
Camping: Waterfall Valley

As with other huts on the track, Waterfall Valley Hut has an adjoining camping area, located approximately 100 metres west of the hut. Independent walkers are allocated an area of grassland, whilst guided groups are allocated elevated wooden platforms 100 metres north-west of the hut. Independent walkers also have the choice of four large tent platforms located near the toilets. During periods of warm dry weather, some walkers opt to pitch a tent on the grassland area to view the surrounding valley and Barn Bluff.

== Surrounding mountains ==
There are a number of mountains that can be accessed from Waterfall Valley Hut. These include Cradle Mountain and Barn Bluff.

== Other Overland Track huts ==
- Kitchen Hut
- Windermere Hut
- Old Pelion Hut
- New Pelion Hut
- Kia Ora Hut
- Bert Nichols Hut
- Narcissus Hut
- Echo Point Hut
