= Narcissus Hut =

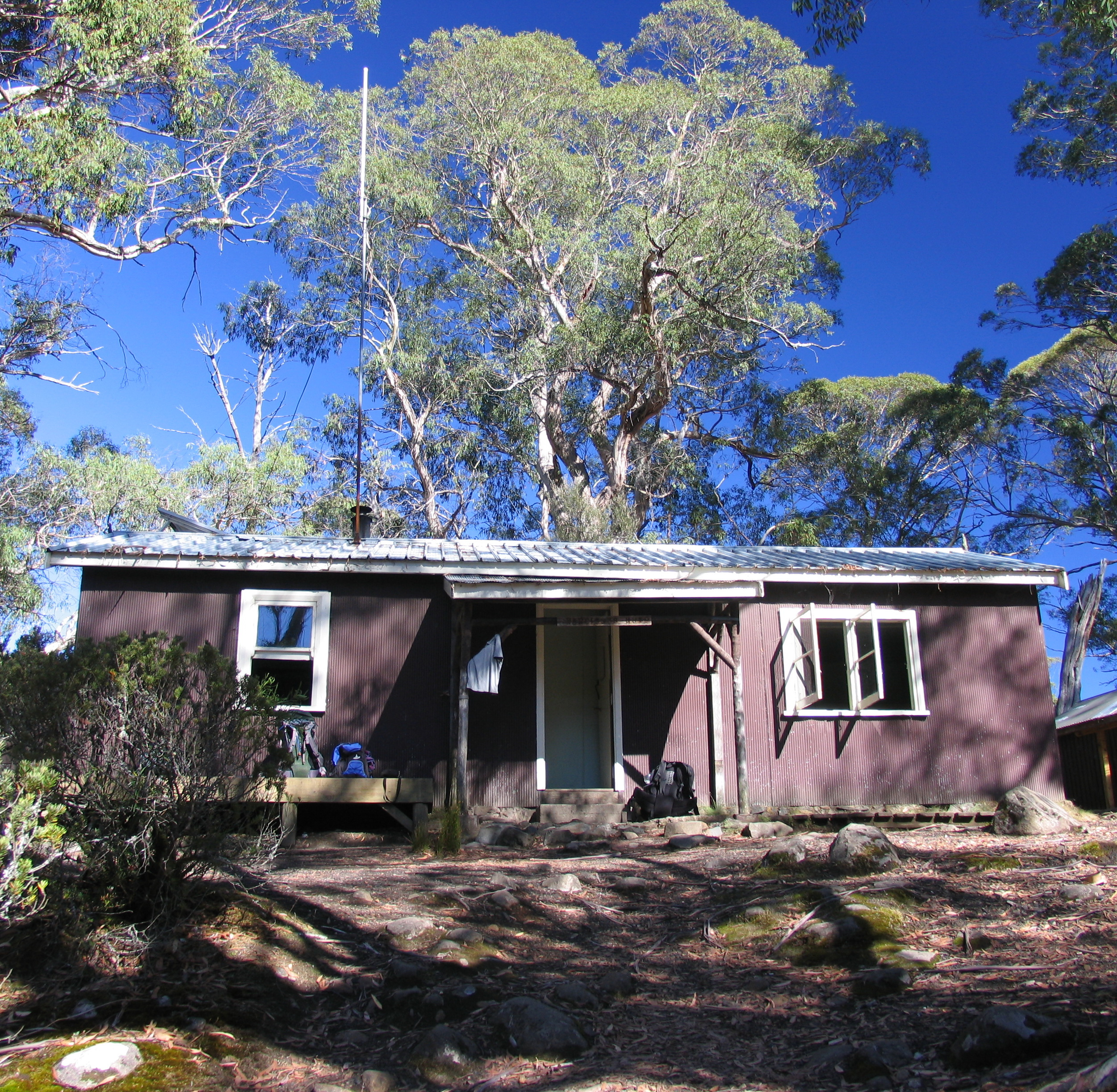
- Interactive map of the Narcissus Hut area

General information
- Coordinates: 42°0′45.1″S 146°6′5.8″E
- Year built: 1935

Narcissus Hut is an alpine hut located in the Central Highlands of Tasmania. It was first built in 1935 and rebuilt in 1963 after being burnt down. The hut was renovated in 2015, when a new sheltered deck was constructed on the eastern side, along with paintwork.

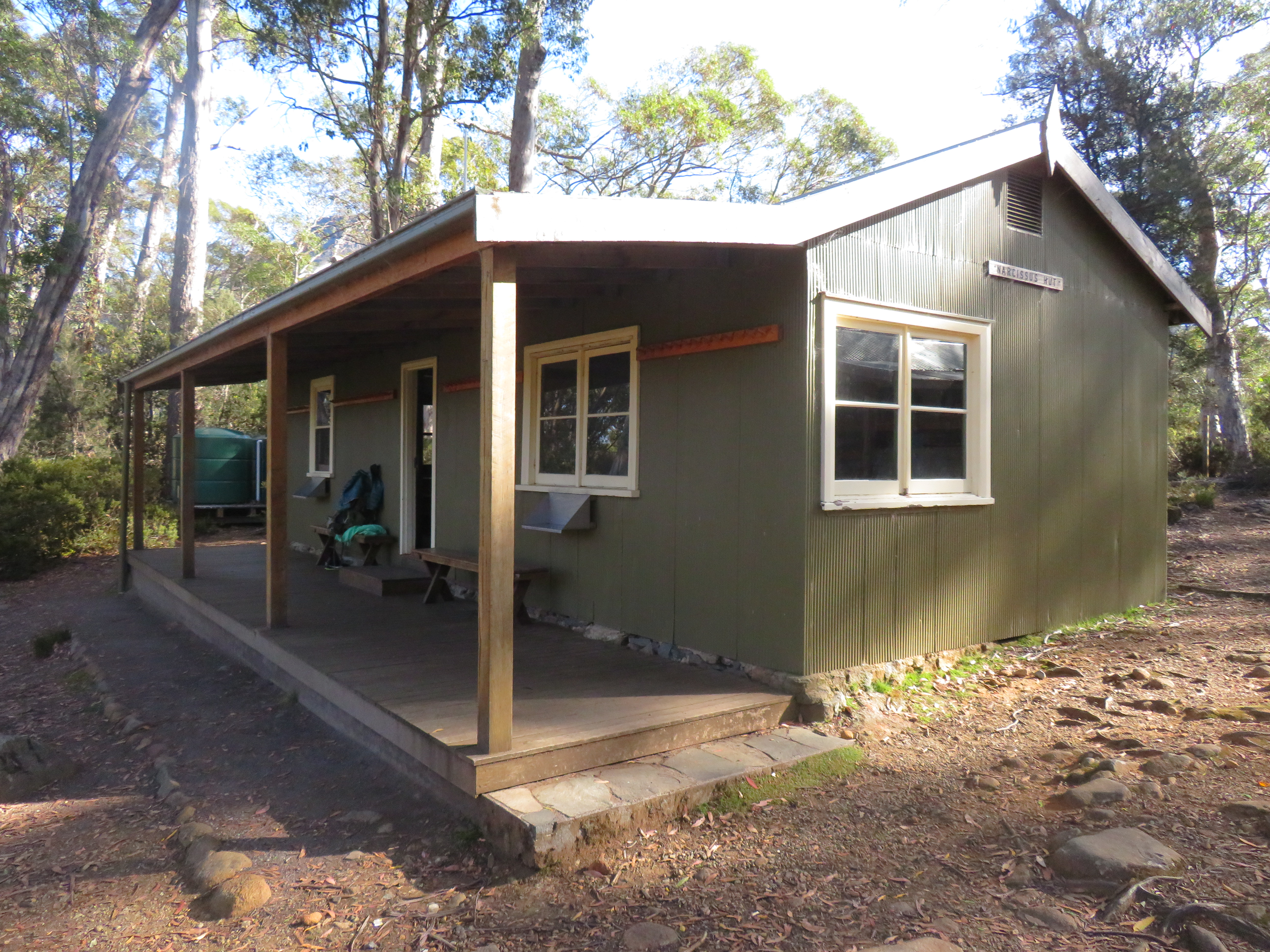
Narcissus Hut on the Overland Track in 2020

Narcissus Hut is located at the northern end of Lake St Clair, on the Overland Track, right beside the Narcissus River.

== Facilities ==
- Bunks (no mattresses)
- Tables & Benches
- Composting toilet
- Rainwater tank
- Radio, for communication with ferry operator
- Ranger Hut (infrequently occupied)

== Access ==
=== By foot (Overland Track) ===
To the north, the Overland Track follows the valley to Bert Nichols Hut, approximately three hours walk.

To the south, it skirts the southern shore of Lake St Clair for 5–6 hours, arriving at the Cynthia Bay trailhead, and the Visitors Centre.

=== By boat ===
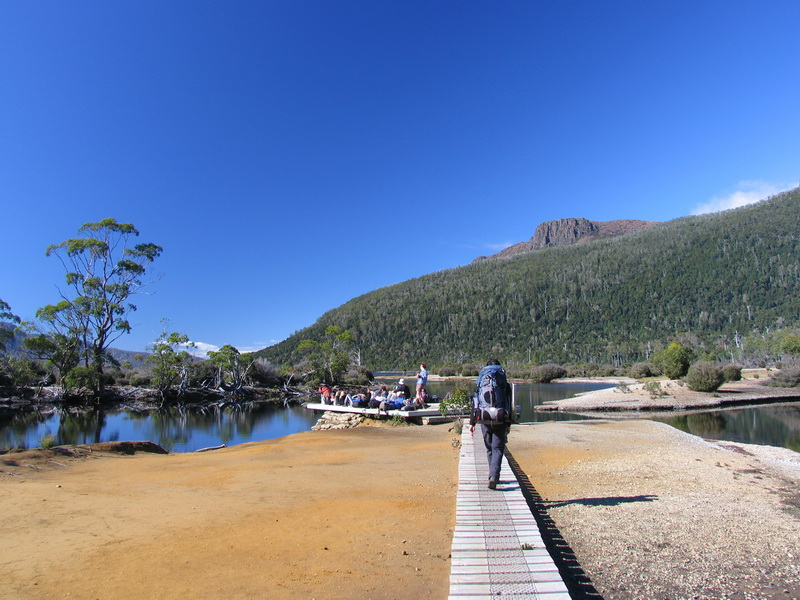
Walkers arrive at the Lake St Clair Jetty.

There is a small jetty on the lake near the hut. During the peak summer season, a ferry runs between the visitors centre and Narcissus Hut, taking 30 minutes and costing A$55.00 (2022/23). Bookings recommended. see http://www.lakestclairlodge.com.au/about-lake-st-clair/lake-st-clair-ferry/ There is a radio to contact the ferry operator at Narcissus Hut. To pre-book call 03 62 891 137 or email
