= Mount Oakleigh =

Mountain in Tasmania, Australia

- Location within Tasmania

Highest point
- Elevation: 1,286 m (4,219 ft)
- Prominence: 416 m (1,365 ft)
- Coordinates: 41.804031°S 146.036967°E

Climbing
- Easiest route: Ascent from New Pelion Hut via Overland Track

Mount Oakleigh is mountain in Tasmania.

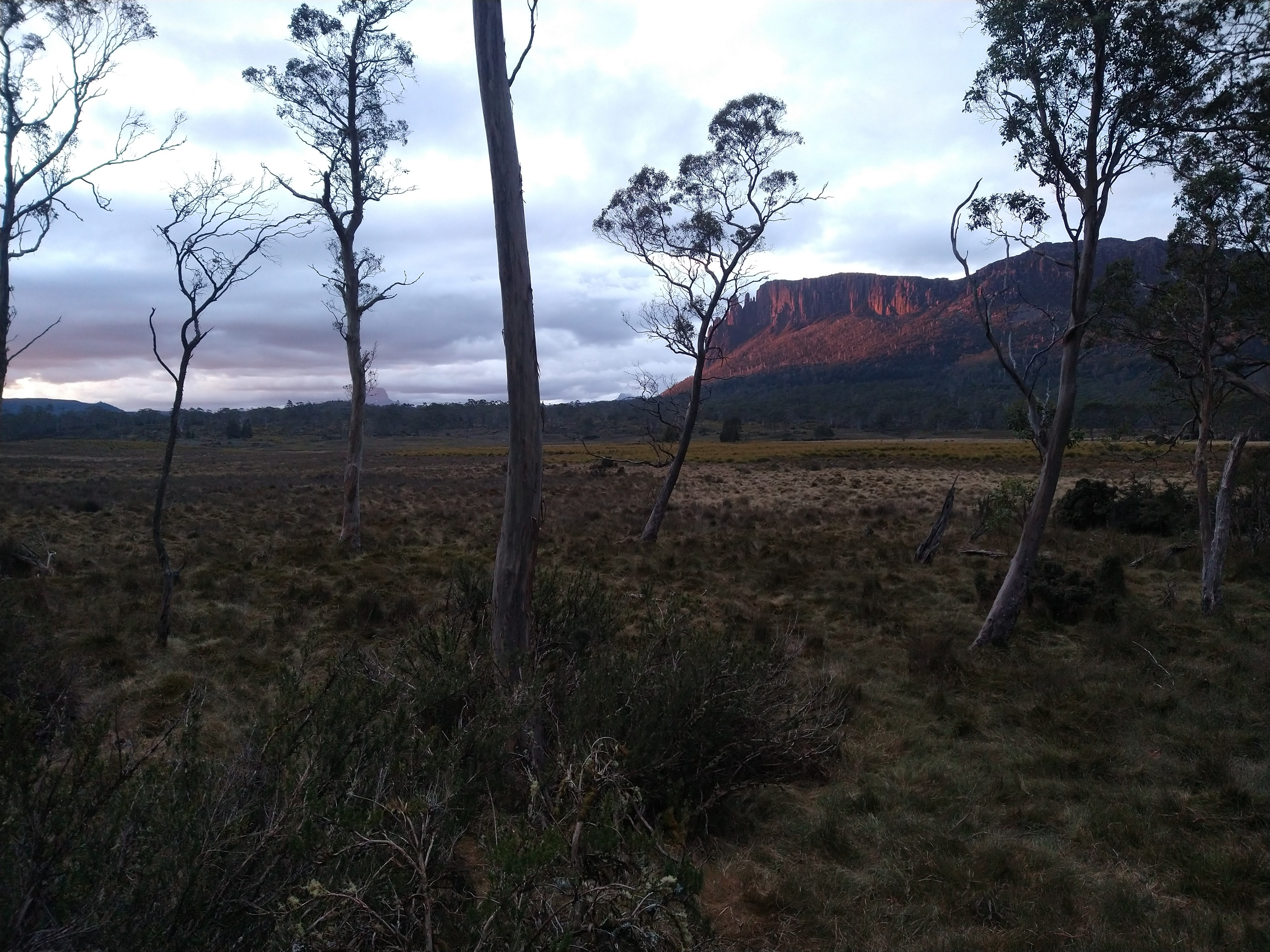
Mt Oakleigh at sunset viewed from New Pelion Hut

== Ascending ==
Mount Oakleigh is generally ascended from New Pelion Hut, which can be accessed from the Arm River Track or the Overland Track. The mountain is near Mt Ossa.
