= New Pelion Hut =

- New Pelion Hut
- Interactive map of the New Pelion Hut area

General information
- Coordinates: 41°49′46.4″S 146°2′46.98″E
- Year built: 2001

New Pelion Hut is the largest alpine hut in the Cradle Mountain-Lake St Clair National Park in the Central Highlands of Tasmania, Australia

== History ==
It was built in 2001. It sleeps up to 60 people, in six separate rooms, and has a large common area that can be divided in two by a roller door. It is heated by a small gas heater that runs for 45-minute intervals. New Pelion Hut is located approximately halfway along the Overland Track, approximately 100 m from the Douglas Creek, and is a popular base for several day walks. Even though the hut is relatively new, it suffers from condensation. It is recommended that some of the windows are to left ajar.

== Facilities ==
New Pelion Hut has similar facilities to most of the other huts on the Overland Track. These include:

- Bunks (No Mattresses)
- Table & Benches
- Composting toilet
- Rainwater tank
- Tent Platforms
- Group Campsite (Tent platforms)
- Helipad (Authorised use only)
- Gas Heater & clothes drying rack

== Access ==
New Pelion Hut is primarily accessed on foot. There is a helipad located next to the hut, however this is mainly used for maintenance and emergencies. There are three maintained walking tracks to access New Pelion Hut:

- The Overland Track from Cradle Mountain.
- The Overland Track from Lake St Clair.
- The Arm River Track from the North East (Near Lake Rowallan).

== Surrounding Mountains ==
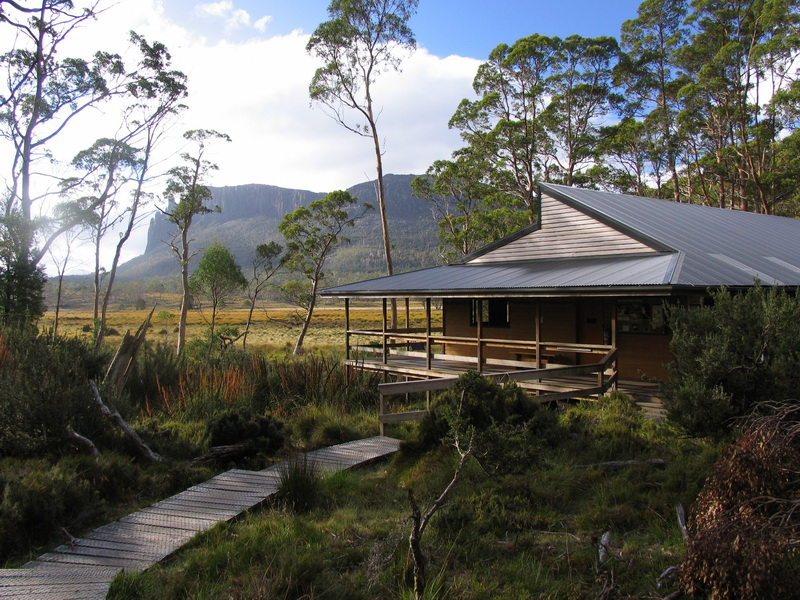
View of Mount Oakleigh from the New Pelion Hut

There are a number of mountains that can be accessed from New Pelion Hut. These include:

- Mount Ossa (Highest Mountain in Tasmania, Australia)
- Mount Pelion East
- Mount Oakleigh
- Mount Thetis
- Mount Achilles
- Mount Pelion West
