= Scott-Kilvert Memorial Hut =

Memorial in Australia

Coordinates: 41.692°S 145.963°E

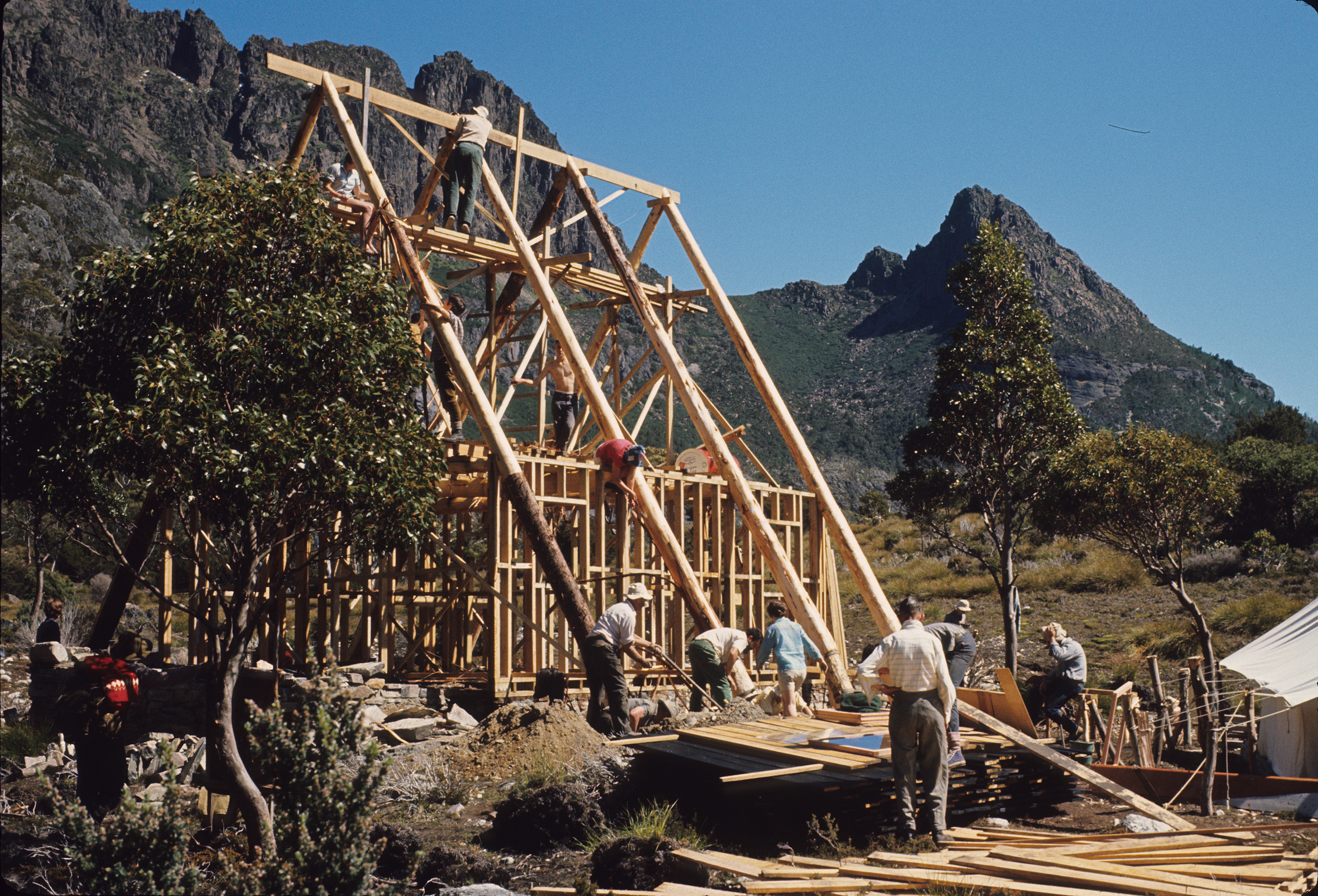
Construction of the hut, with eight King Billy A-frame supports in place (19 December 1965)

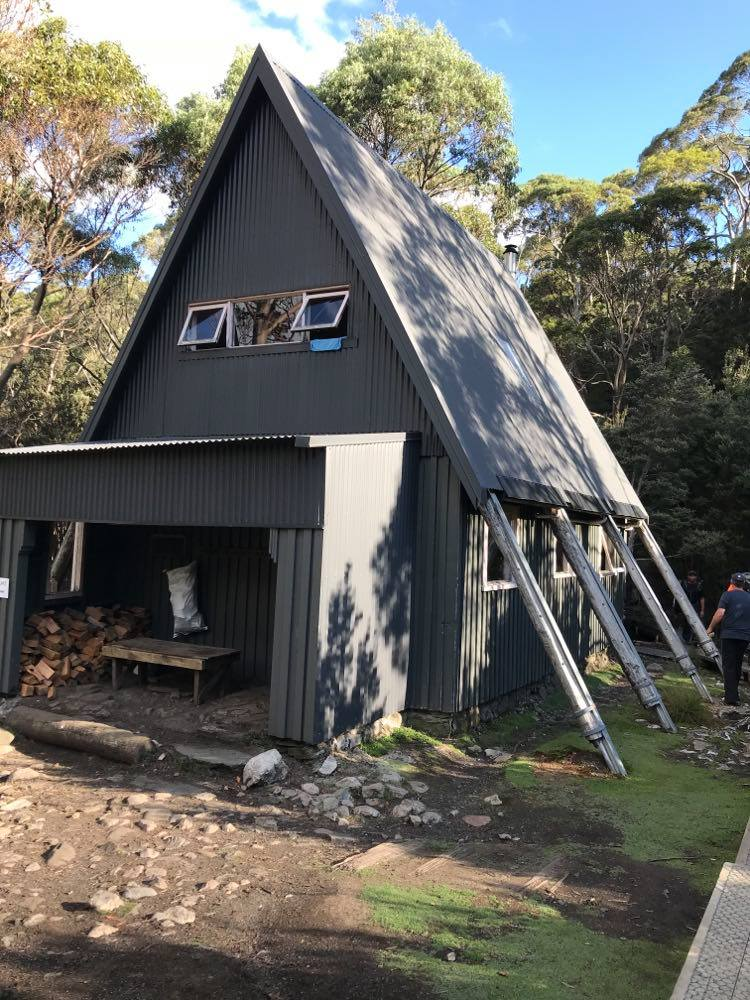
Exterior of the Hut (15 February 2020)

The Scott-Kilvert Memorial Hut commemorates teacher Ewen Scott and student David Kilvert, who died in near-blizzard conditions at Cradle Mountain, Tasmania, Australia on 20 May 1965 on a Riverside High School walking trip. After their deaths, Riverside High School and the Launceston Walking Club submitted plans to the Scenery Preservation Board for a memorial hut at Lake Rodway. Assisted by members of the North West Walking Club, work began in September 1965. The hut was dedicated by headmaster John Walker on 3 April 1966.

== Walking trip ==
The Riverside High Outdoor Society was a club for students interested in bushwalking, giving them opportunities for day and overnight walks. A five-day walk through the northern half of the Cradle Mountain-Lake St Clair Reserve (as it was then known), from the Pelion area to Waldheim, was planned for May 1965. Three teachers were co-leaders: science teacher John Chick, who had bushwalking and leadership experience; physical-education teacher Rosemary Bayes; and teacher-in-training Ewen Scott, a member of the Launceston Walking Club. They left Launceston on Sunday, 16 May 1965, with 16 students: 15 from Riverside High School and a friend of the principal from Sydney.

The walk began at the Arm River Track on the Upper Mersey River. The party split in two during the walk to Pelion Hut because of the students' different walking paces: "The first party arrived at the hut about 5pm and the stragglers got in half an hour later. Conditions were cloudy with occasional light showers".

The party remained in Pelion Hut on Monday night, and walked to Windemere Hut on Tuesday. Chick arrived with the slower members of the party at dark: "The physical condition of the leaders and pupils was excellent. However, it was becoming clear that there were some members of the party who walked slower than others".

The first members of the party arrived at the Waterfall Valley Hut hut on Wednesday in the mid-afternoon. The others arrived about 5 pm, while it was still light. Snow had fallen the night before, but during the day "conditions were perfect. Some snow and rain fell when the party was nearly at Waterfall Valley hut".

According to Chick, "On Thursday morning, intermittent rain continued, and we deliberately delayed our departure to the latest practicable time, hoping for some let-up in the weather. It eased, and we set off about noon". At 1 pm, the party were on the Cirque between Barn Bluff and Cradle Mountain. The wind was blowing "in excess of 60 m.p.h. There was no actual snow falling, but the wind was driving a lot of ground snow along". The party had decided the night before that if conditions were poor they would take the Lake Rodway track to Waldheim instead of the more-exposed Kitchen Hut route. Chick told the inquest, "I was in the lead of the party at this stage. Scott had been leading throughout the walk. He knew the area, and I was content to follow and look after the slow ones… This was the only time in the expedition our positions were reversed". Scott took the lead again at Lake Rodway, while Chick dropped behind with three girls.

On Thursday, past Lake Rodway, the party realised that they were in trouble. Rodney Howell, one of the students, was the first to exhibit exhaustion. The party stopped for about 10 minutes on the southern slopes of Hansons Peak to distribute the contents of his pack and eat. When the walk resumed, Chick was in the rear with three girls and Scott was in front with the others "by a slowly increasing distance": "Weather conditions were cold; there was still a strong wind blowing but there was no snow falling. There were occasional showers. At this stage, it was about 4 o’clock and visibility was poor. We could not see from one party to the other."

On the climb to Hansons Peak, 14-year-old David Kilvert collapsed for the first time. Scott began assisting Kilvert, who "was now in poor shape", at about 4:30 pm and sent three students ahead to obtain help from the park ranger at Waldheim. The party was now split into four groups. Three students (Diane Batten, Peter Williams and Bernard Hay) had gone ahead to get help. Teacher Rosemary Bayes and eight students were in the main group. Just behind the main group was Scott, who was assisting David Kilvert; Chick, three girls and a boy were in the rear. The four groups walked over Hansons Peak as darkness fell.

The three students in the front group reached Dove Lake. Unaware that a road had recently been constructed from Waldheim to the lake, they remained on the walking track (which led to Waldheim via Lake Lilla). Dianne Batten told the inquest:

We got to the Lake Lilla outlet, and by this time it was dark. There wasn’t a bridge or anything, and we didn’t know how deep it was. We lost the track about 20 yards from the river. We couldn’t cross the river so we headed back towards the boat shed. But we lost the track again so we finally spent the night in the wood. Next morning we found that the outlet was only ankle deep so we went on to Waldheim and got help.

The main group, led by Bayes, spent the night in the Dove Lake boat shed. The rear group, out of contact with the others, lost the track on the slopes of Hansons Peak and spent the night in a sheltered location. The last person to see Scott and Kilvert alive was 15-year-old Mark Whittle, just after he was sent ahead to join the main group on the ascent of Hansons Peak. Whittle and another student had been helping Kilvert until Scott said something like, "You go on and leave David with me": "Mr Scott was carrying David in his arms and they fell and tumbled down a bank from the track. It was a drop of about six feet. The last I saw of them they were still lying there, but they were making an attempt to get up and I felt they were all right". Whittle did not offer assistance to Scott and Kilvert because "I won't say he [Scott] ordered us to go on, but he told us very firmly". Kilvert’s body was found the next day, about 400 metres from where Whittle had last seen him, off the track: "I don't know whether he fell down or whether in fact Ewen Scott had actually placed him there. Ewen may have realised that the others may have come along behind and he didn't want them to find David."

Scott died of exhaustion and exposure. His body was found a short distance from Dove Lake, near the end of the new road which had been constructed the previous year. Whittle said, "It seems that, after carrying David Kilvert for some distance, Ewen Scott realised that David was fading, or perhaps had passed away. No-one knows exactly what happened, but it seems that Ewen left David and set off to get help". Pat Wessing, who was staying at the Blandfordia Alpine Club in Cradle Valley, made the discovery:

Friday, 21st May 1965

Des Lyons just going out – party from Riverside High (19 in number and 3 teachers) stranded out over Hansons and one dead. Still raining…

Sent children to fill all hot water bottles, make up thermoses with coffee and glucose – was filling own when Ranger came down from Lake. Met police car coming from Wilmot. Offered to show them the way, so went up in police car with two policemen.

At start, to get to the track to Hansons, they cut across [from turning circle at end of road] as other searchers had done. I went [the longer way] down the jeep track and turned to the left, where I met the old walking track. There, just where marked “X” on plan, in small patch of Boronia citriodora, I saw a man lying face down. I called the police after I had turned him over, but he was dead. Had red light-nylon parka, good boots, and fleecy-lined cotton pants. Had head wound, but had apparently been in bad state, and suspect exhaustion and weather had combined to cause his circulation to pack up. Hands dead white. Rigor mortis had set in.

We decided two hefty policemen of more use helping get remaining six down [the Rear Group of 5], so they put the body in the back of the assistant ranger’s car and I drove it back to Waldheim. Girl there identified body as Ewen Scott.

Scott, born on 1 January 1939, was educated at Launceston Technical High School and worked in industrial chemistry with Patons and Baldwins in Launceston. In 1959, he represented Tasmania in the Australian 10,000-metre Cross-Country Championship. In early 1964, he began studying at the University of Tasmania for his science degree. A plaque at Dove Lake, near the place of his death, has an inscription paraphrased from Matthew 26:13: "That which he hath done shall be spoken for a memorial of him".

== Hut construction ==
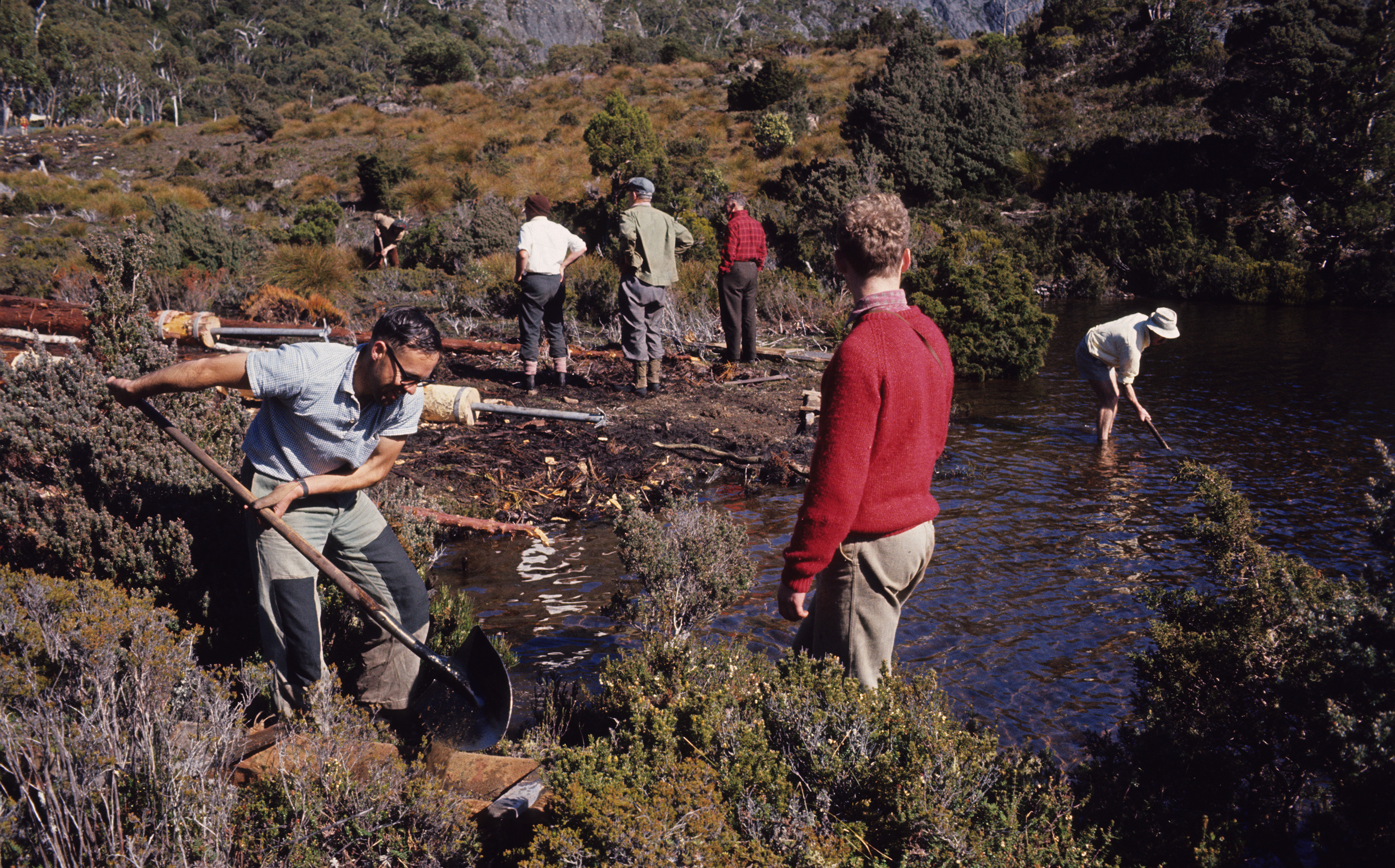
North-West Walking Club members digging for gravel, Lake Rodway (November 1965)

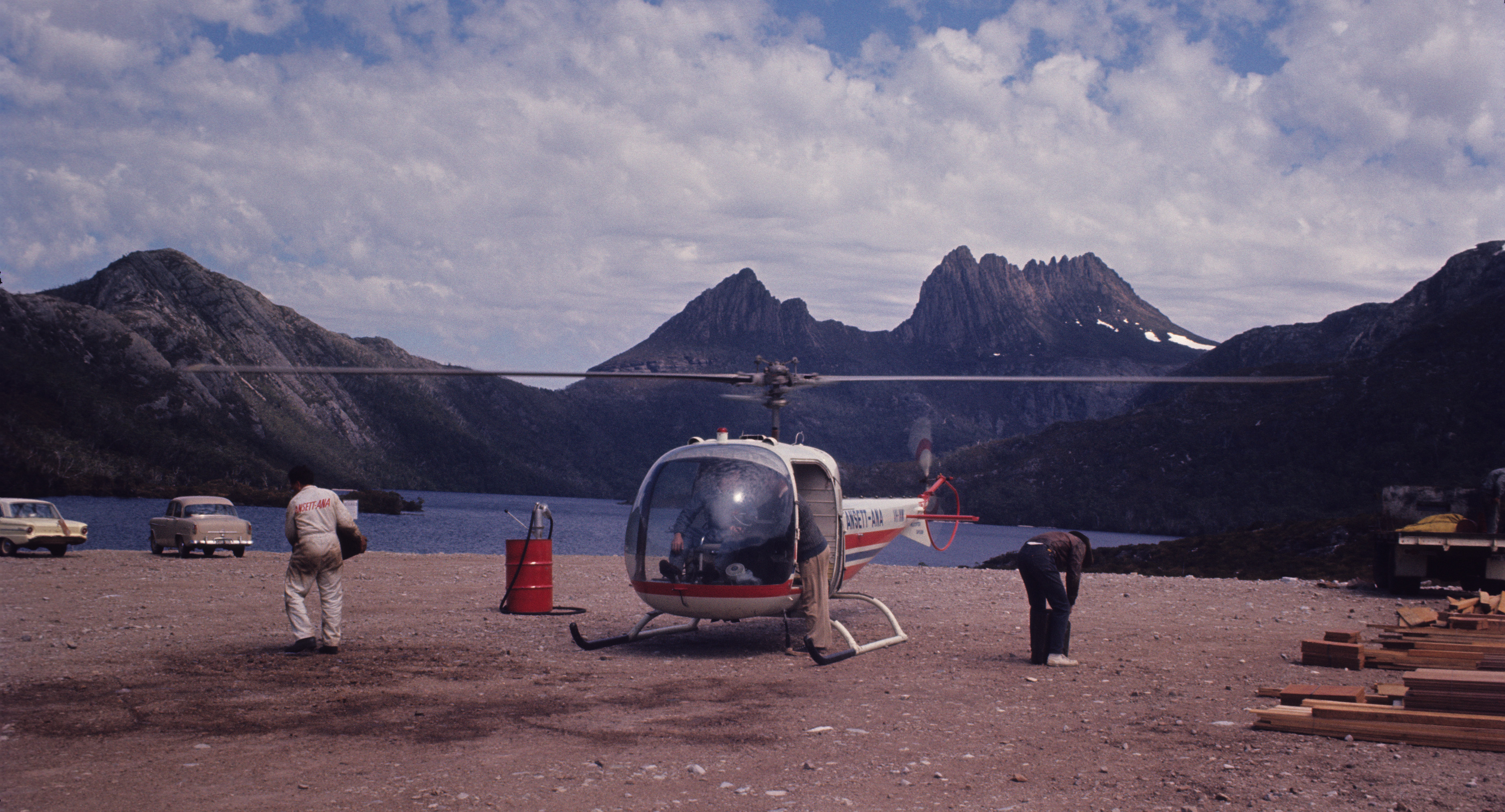
Ansett-ANA helicopter at Dove Lake car park, Cradle Mountain (31 October 1965), with material for hut

The hut was financed by a public appeal, which raised $3,000. It was built by Riverside High School and Launceston Walking Club with help from other organisations, such as the North West Walking Club. Plans were drawn up by architect Arnold Rowlands, a member of the North West Walking Club whose wife Mavis was a cousin of Scott. The plan was approved by the Scenic Preservation Board, and work began at the Lake Rodway site in September 1965, under the cliffs of the southern face of Cradle Mountain. The Board had wanted a hut on Lake Rodway for some time, but had been unable to finance it.

Near the hut was a good supply of building material. King Billy pines for timber required came from nearby, gravel for the foundation came from the lake, and stone for the hut walls came from a small hill 100 metres away. Due to the size of the hut and the distance from the nearest road at Dove Lake (6 kilometres, with a 500-metre climb), a helicopter was used to move material which could not be sourced locally. An Ansett-ANA helicopter made 53 round trips in one weekend, moving 14 tons of material to the site at a cost of about $1,000. After several alterations to the plans, and with the support of the North West Walking Club, an additional six tons of timber was carried in by pack.

Work parties, supervised by professional builder and keen bushwalker Stan Brodziak, were on site every other weekend during the construction period. A total of 15 weekends were required. In January, ten people stayed for a week and transformed the hut from a bare frame to an almost-liveable hut with a porch, asbestos roofing tiles (supplied at a discount by a local cement company), and a fireplace. The inglenook fireplace had seating around a central hearth.

The A-frame hut was designed to withstand severe weather. For its main supports, eight King Billy pine trees were felled and floated 300 metres across Lake Rodway. Each support, weighing about 750 kilograms (1,650 lb), was moved into place by hand. The hut accommodates about 30 people in the upstairs sleeping area.

It took 10,000 man-hours and 38 working days to complete, and was officially opened on 3 April 1966. The weather was poor, and walkers began arriving in steady rain at 10 am. At noon, almost 300 people had assembled to see the hut and hear speeches. The plaque was unveiled by Riverside High School headmaster John Walker.
