= Old Pelion Hut =

Alpine hut in Central Highlands in Tasmania

- Interactive map of the Old Pelion Hut area

General information
- Coordinates: 41°49′46.4″S 146°2′46.98″E
- Year built: 1890s

Old Pelion Hut is an alpine hut located in Cradle Mountain-Lake St Clair National Park in the Central Highlands of Tasmania. It was built for the Mount Pelion Copper Mining Company at around 1936.

In 1980, the hut and its surroundings (i.e. 400 metres (1,300 ft) radius) were listed on the now-defunct Register of the National Estate. As of 2019, the hut is included as part of the listing for the Pelion Copper Mine on the Tasmanian Heritage Register.

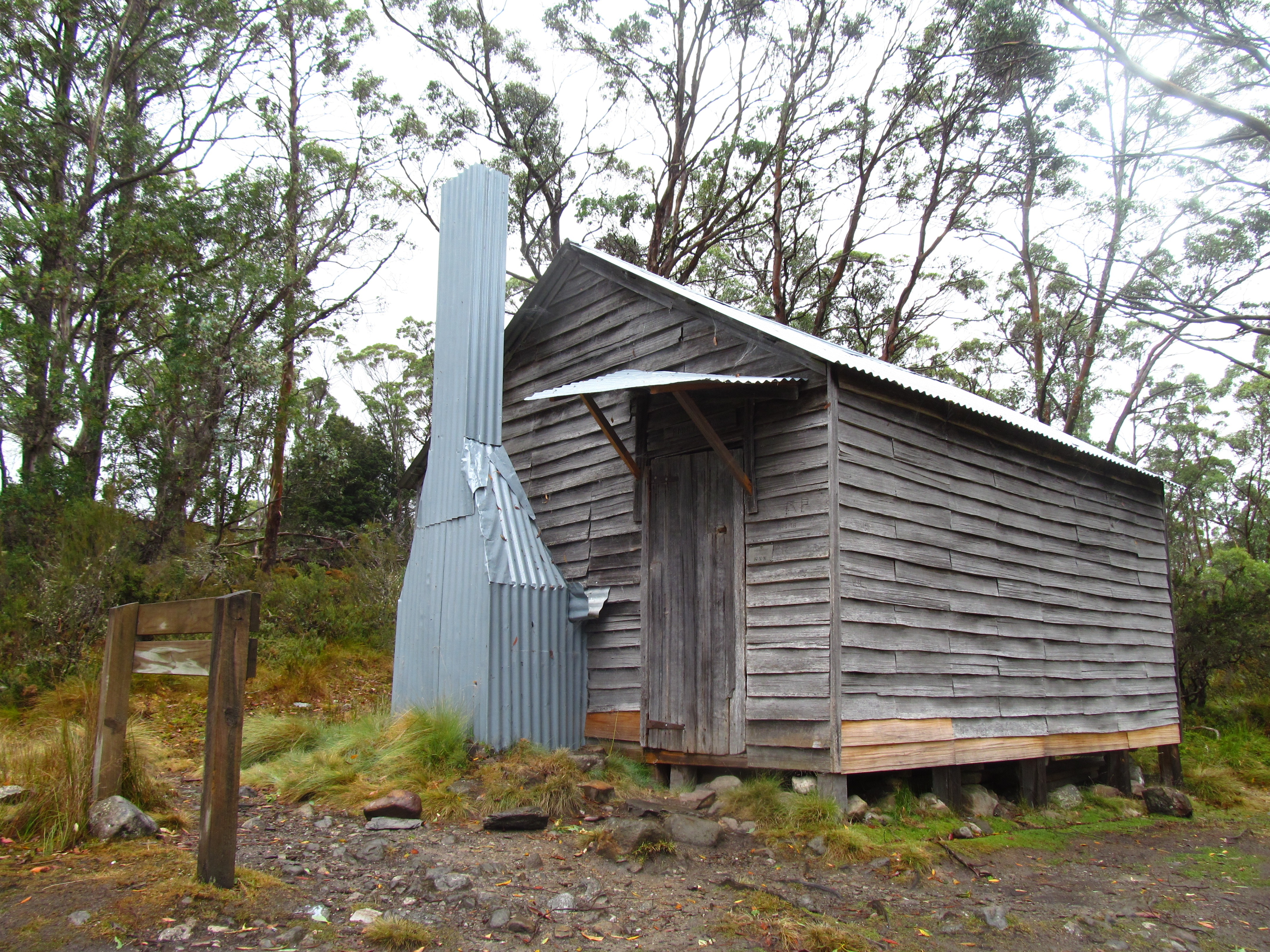
Old Pelion Hut
