= Barn Bluff =

Mountain in Tasmania, Australia

- Barn Bluff from Waterfall Valley

Highest point
- Elevation: 1,559 m (5,115 ft)
- Prominence: 622 m (2,041 ft)
- Isolation: 12.78 km (7.94 mi)
- Listing: 4th highest mountain in Tasmania
- Coordinates: 41°43′12″S 145°55′12″E

Geography
- Location within Tasmania
- Location: Central Highlands, Tasmania, Australia
- Parent range: Cradle Cirque - Bluff Cirque

Geology
- Rock age: Jurassic
- Mountain type: Dolerite

Climbing
- Normal route: Walk / hike via the Overland Track

Barn Bluff is a mountain located in the Central Highlands region of Tasmania, Australia. The mountain is situated in the Cradle Mountain-Lake St Clair National Park at the junction of the easternmost points of the Murchison and Mackintosh river catchments.

At 1,559 metres (5,115 ft) above sea level it is the fourth highest mountain in Tasmania, exceeding the height of the more famous Cradle Mountain by 14 metres (46 ft).

The Barn Bluff is frequently snow-covered, sometimes even in summer. This mountain is perhaps the most prominent peak of the Cradle Mountain-Lake St Clair National Park and is visible from most areas and stands on its own, well away from other peaks. It is a popular venue for bushwalkers and mountain climbers, accessible via a side trip from the Overland Track. The path is moderate to difficult and has very steep sections, with boulder scrambling toward summit. The route is marked by cairns.

The mountain was formed by glacial action and erosion and is characterised, for the most part, by the dolerite slabs and boulders typical of the alpine regions of the state. Many of the summits in Tasmania are rather obscure tors perched only slightly higher than the alpine plateau on which they sit. Barn Bluff, like Cradle Mountain, presents a classic summit. The mountain's nearest neighbours are quite distant and, therefore, the 360-degree panorama from the summit is uninterrupted and spectacular.

== See also ==
- Cradle Mountain-Lake St Clair National Park
- List of highest mountains of Tasmania
