= Lake St Clair (Tasmania) =

Lake in Tasmania, Australia

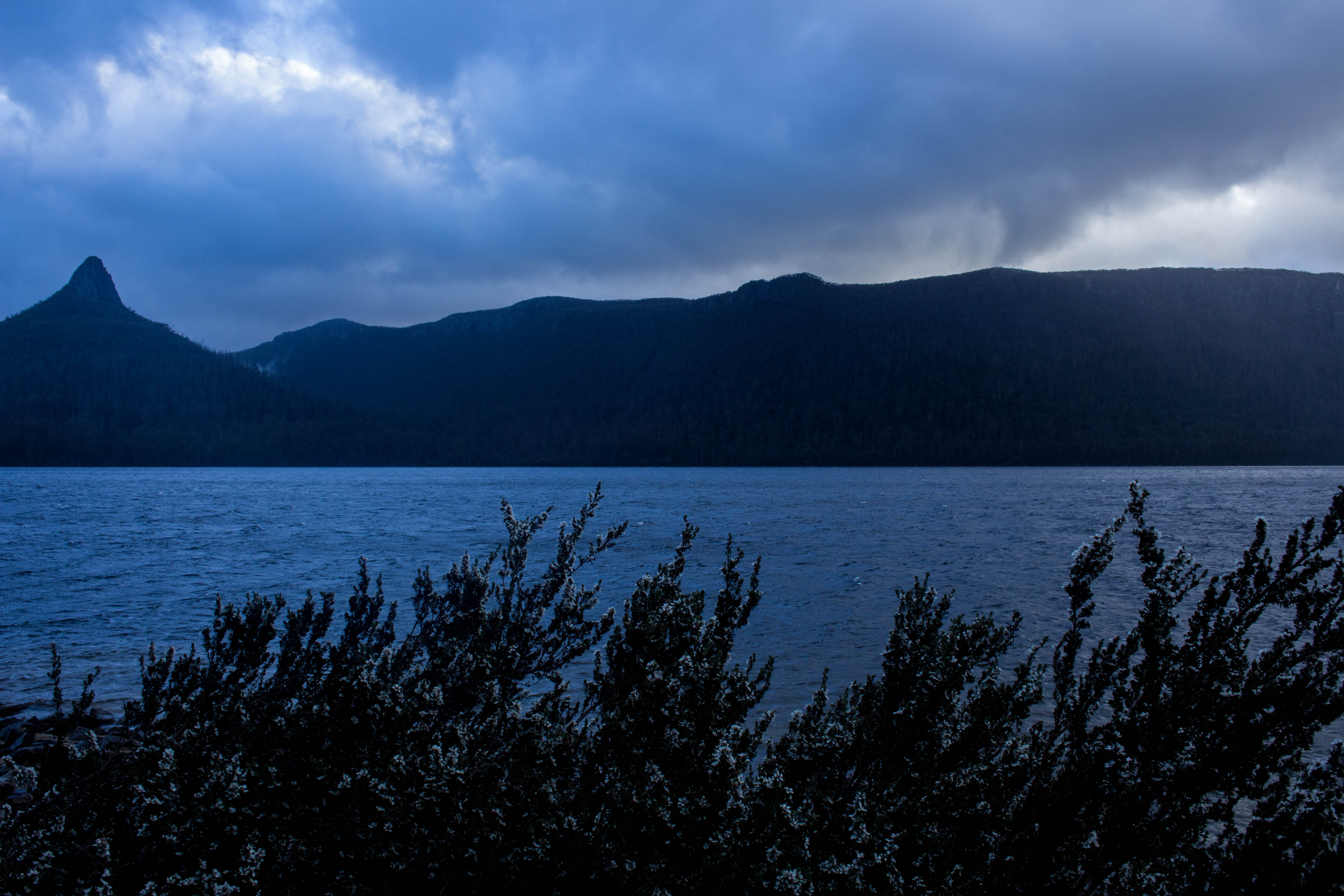
- Lake St Clair from Echo Point with Mount Ida to the left

- Location in Tasmania
- Location: Central Highlands, Tasmania
- Coordinates: 42°4′S 146°10′E
- Type: Freshwater lake
- River sources: Narcissus River; Cuvier River; Hamilton Creek
- Primary outflows: River Derwent
- Basin countries: Australia
- Designation: Cradle Mountain-Lake St Clair National Park; Tasmanian Wilderness World Heritage Site
- Max. length: 15 km (9.3 mi)
- Max. width: 3 km (1.9 mi)
- Surface area: 45 km^{2} (17 sq mi)
- Max. depth: 163 m (535 ft)
- Surface elevation: 737 m (2,418 ft) AHD

Lake St Clair or leeawuleena is a natural freshwater lake in the Central Highlands area of Tasmania, Australia. The lake forms the southern end of the Cradle Mountain-Lake St Clair National Park. It has an area of approximately 45 square kilometres (17 sq mi), and was measured to have a maximum depth of 163 metres (535 ft) in 2025, making it Australia's deepest lake. It was previously thought to be up to 215 metres (705 ft) deep.

The lake is fed by Narcissus River, Cuvier River, and Hamilton Creek and marks the start of the River Derwent.

The locality of Lake St Clair is in the local government areas of Central Highlands (24%), Meander Valley (12%), and West Coast (64%). The southern end of the lake is about 106 kilometres (66 mi) north-west of the town of Hamilton.

== Geology ==
Lake St Clair was formed through glacial erosion, along with the surrounding river valleys.

== History ==
Lake St Clair is located on the edge of the Big River Tasmanian Aboriginal nation, and there is evidence that they hunted on the surrounding button grass plains. Numerous small quarries and campgrounds are located nearby, with the closest dated site putting human occupation at 10,000 years ago.

The first European explorer to see the lake was surveyor William Sharland in 1832, with George Frankland leading an expedition to it three years later. Although sources such as The Viking of Van Diemen's Land credit Jørgen Jørgensen with an earlier discovery of the lake in 1826, this is not considered credible. In 1840 James Calder cut a track from the lake to Macquarie Harbour, followed by another more practical track by Burgess. The Burgess track was maintained and re-cut by miners until 1883 when a new lower level route was discovered, which later became the Lyell Highway.

The area surrounding the lake was used by snarers and hunters from 1860 until the collapse of the fur trade in the 1950s, although it was illegal from 1927 onwards.

In 1937 the Derwent River was dammed just below the lake, and a pumping station installed - enabling Hydro Tasmania to drain the lake up to 6 metres and feed water to the Tarraleah Power Station. The fluctuating water levels have caused erosion and environmental degradation since. The pumphouse was decommissioned in the 1990s, and transformed into a hotel in 2015.

The Cradle Mountain-Lake St Clair area was declared a scenic reserve in 1922, a wildlife reserve in 1927, a national park in 1947 and a world heritage area from 1982.

== Geography ==
The locality has an area of 839.4 square kilometres (324.1 sq mi), of which the lake occupies about 45 square kilometres (17 sq mi) in the south-east corner. The Cradle Mountain-Lake St Clair National Park occupies all of the locality, plus the locality of Cradle Mountain to the north.

=== Climate ===
Lake St Clair has a cold Oceanic climate (Köppen: Cfb), bordering on a Subpolar oceanic climate (Köppen: Cfc), with cool to cold weather year-round. Over the period 1990 to 2004, there were on average 33.1 snowy days annually, which can occur in any month of the year. It is very cloudy, particularly in the cooler months, with an average of 75 and 78 sun hours in June and July. There are 19.4 clear days annually and 163.4 cloudy days.

Climate data for Lake St Clair National Park (1989–2025, extremes 1957–2025); 742 m AMSL; 42.12° S, 146.18° E
Month	Jan	Feb	Mar	Apr	May	Jun	Jul	Aug	Sep	Oct	Nov	Dec	Year
Record high °C (°F)	33.9 (93.0)	35.0 (95.0)	31.4 (88.5)	24.9 (76.8)	21.7 (71.1)	16.5 (61.7)	13.5 (56.3)	17.0 (62.6)	22.2 (72.0)	27.3 (81.1)	29.8 (85.6)	32.7 (90.9)	35.0 (95.0)
Mean daily maximum °C (°F)	19.7 (67.5)	19.2 (66.6)	16.9 (62.4)	13.0 (55.4)	10.1 (50.2)	7.8 (46.0)	7.2 (45.0)	8.1 (46.6)	10.2 (50.4)	12.8 (55.0)	15.7 (60.3)	17.5 (63.5)	13.2 (55.7)
Mean daily minimum °C (°F)	6.4 (43.5)	6.1 (43.0)	4.6 (40.3)	3.1 (37.6)	1.8 (35.2)	0.3 (32.5)	0.0 (32.0)	0.2 (32.4)	1.1 (34.0)	2.0 (35.6)	3.8 (38.8)	5.2 (41.4)	2.9 (37.2)
Record low °C (°F)	−2.5 (27.5)	−4.0 (24.8)	−4.1 (24.6)	−5.0 (23.0)	−6.0 (21.2)	−11.5 (11.3)	−10.0 (14.0)	−8.5 (16.7)	−6.5 (20.3)	−6.5 (20.3)	−4.0 (24.8)	−2.6 (27.3)	−11.5 (11.3)
Average precipitation mm (inches)	93.9 (3.70)	80.3 (3.16)	107.5 (4.23)	131.2 (5.17)	176.7 (6.96)	168.1 (6.62)	211.3 (8.32)	235.5 (9.27)	214.8 (8.46)	176.4 (6.94)	129.0 (5.08)	132.1 (5.20)	1,852.3 (72.93)
Average precipitation days (≥ 0.2 mm)	14.6	13.0	16.5	18.8	21.4	21.9	23.7	24.6	23.9	22.2	17.7	17.9	236.2
Mean monthly sunshine hours	244.9	220.4	176.7	126.0	86.8	75.0	77.5	99.2	117.0	176.7	189.0	201.5	1,790.7
Source 1: Lake St Clair National Park (general data, 1989–2025)
Source 2: Lake St Clair (HEC, sunshine 1964–1989, integrated extremes to 1957)

== Road infrastructure ==
The C193 route (Lake St Clair Road) enters from the south-east and runs to the southern shore of the lake, where it ends.

== Tourism ==
In 1871, the Tasmanian Guidebook mentioned Lake St Clair as being "admired for its scenery by the few who visit". By 1900 there was a boatshed, accommodation, improved access and horse paddocks at Cynthia Bay, with the first tourists arriving by car in 1915.

From 1911 the beginnings of the Overland Track to Cradle Mountain began to form, with the route officially blazed by Bert Nichols in 1931.

A guesthouse was built at Cynthia Bay in 1930, followed by improved parking, camping and visitor facilities. The lake has been a popular tourist destination, with most tourists visiting to walk, photograph and learn about the history.

Following a decision by the Tasmanian Government to allow development in national parks and conservation areas, an "in principle" permit was granted for the establishment of an "eco-friendly" resort at Pumphouse Point at Lake St Clair. The resort was completed in 2015.

== Gallery ==
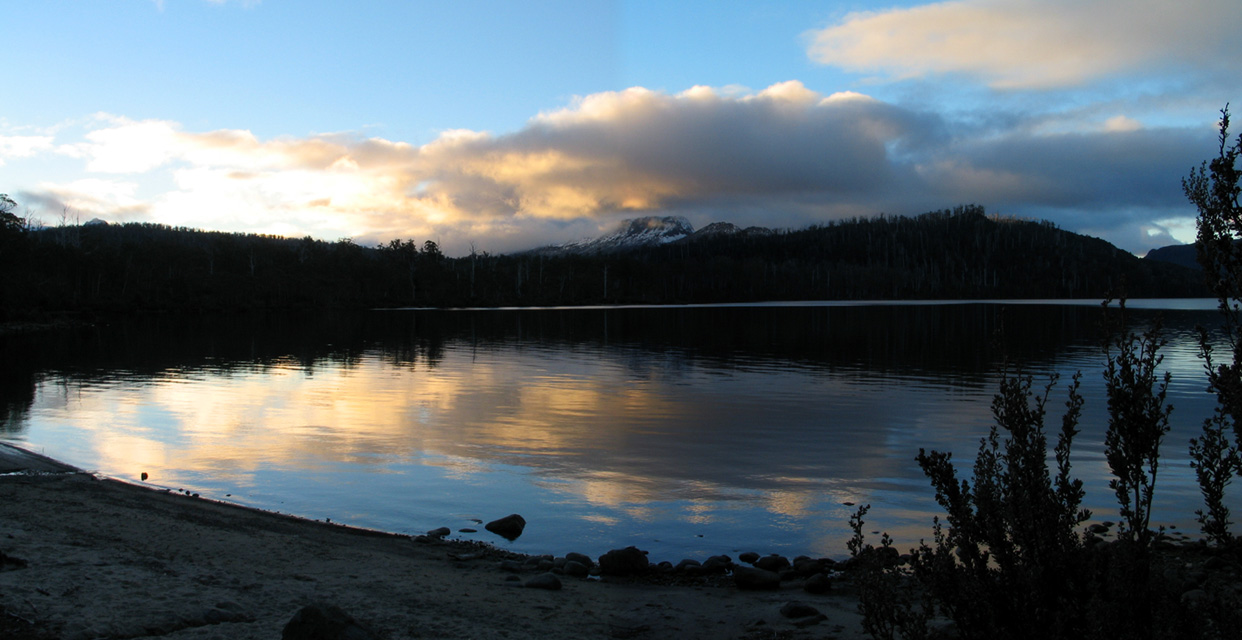
Lake St Clair sunset

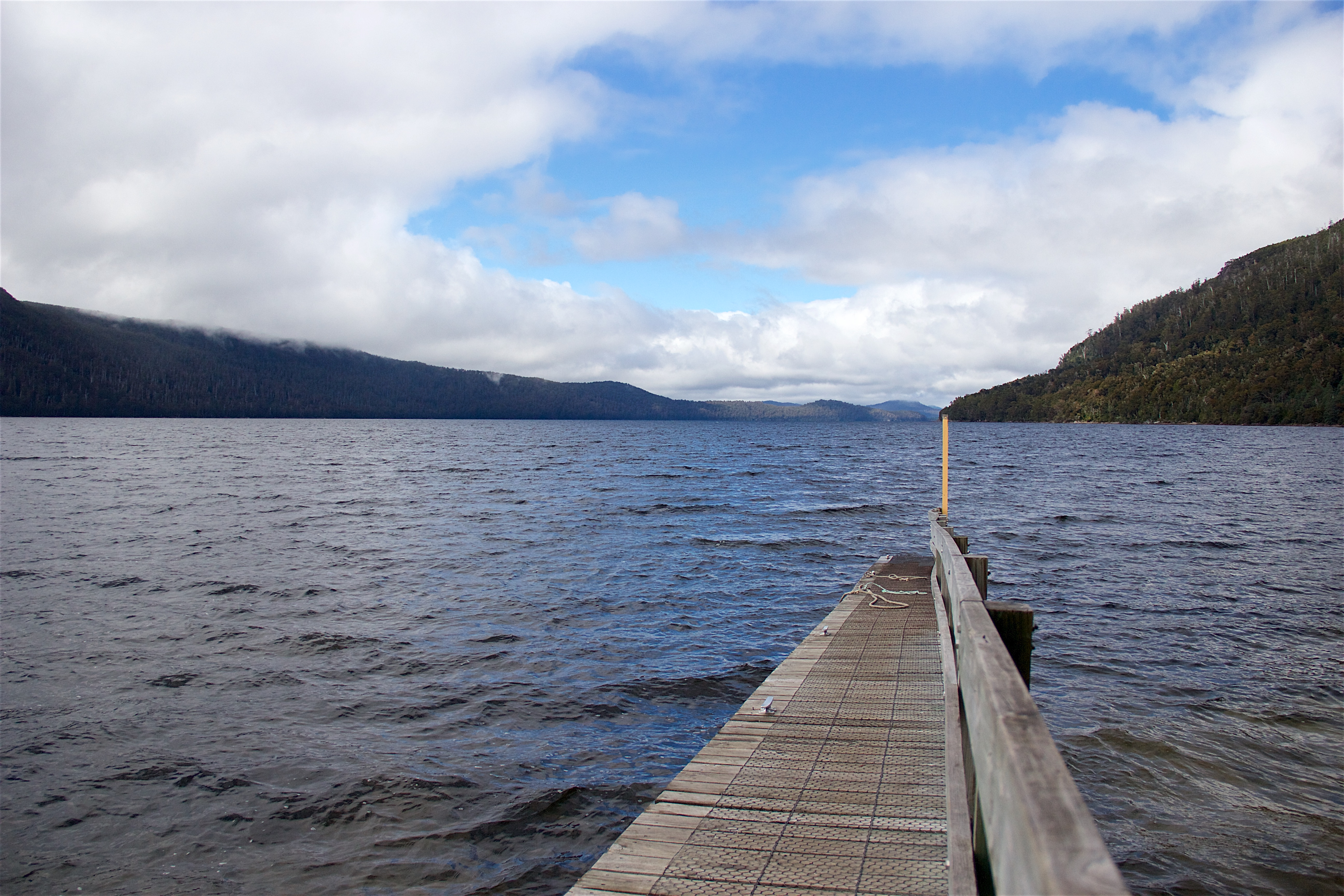
Lake St Clair from Echo Point

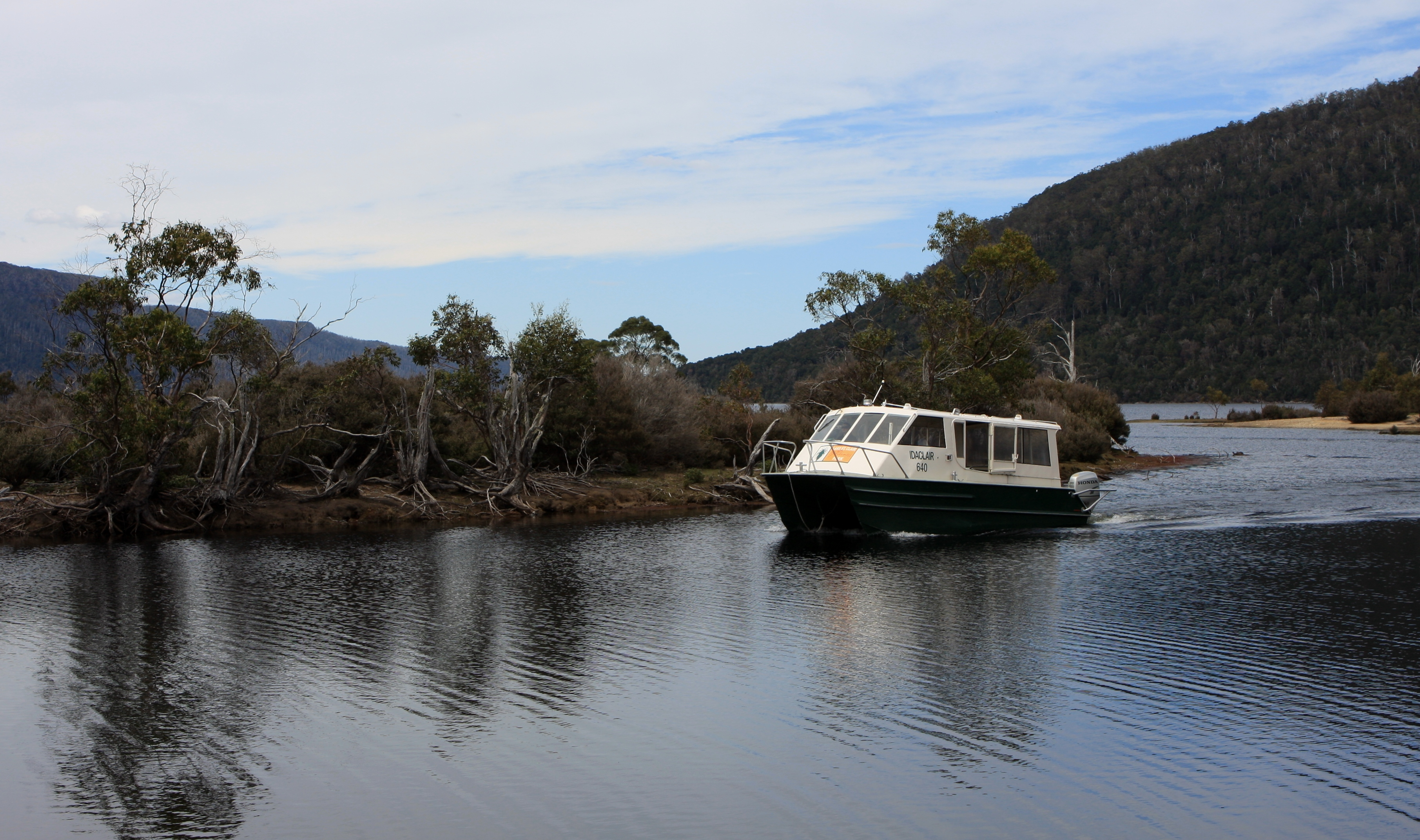
Our ride down Lake St. Clair

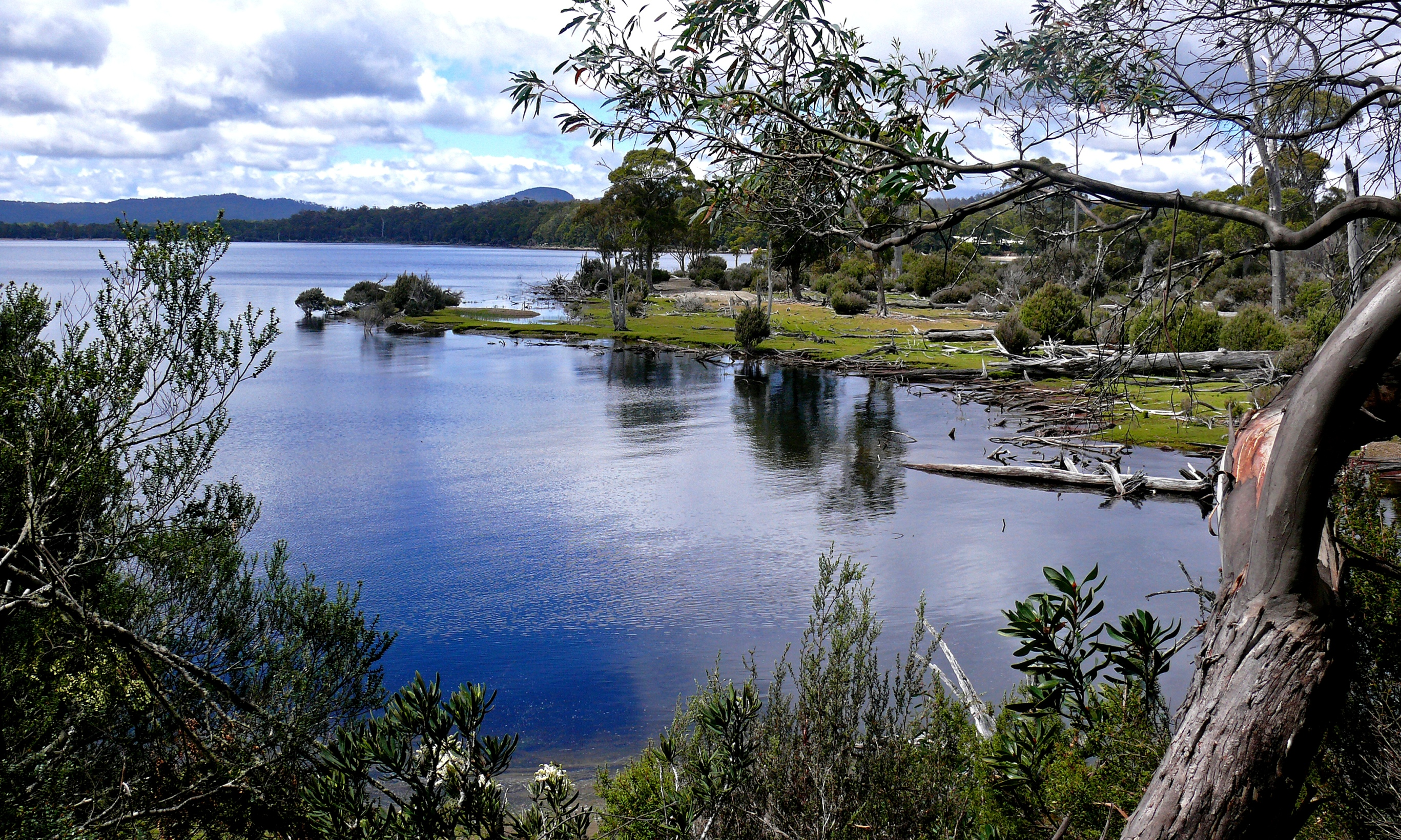
Lake St Clair NP Tas

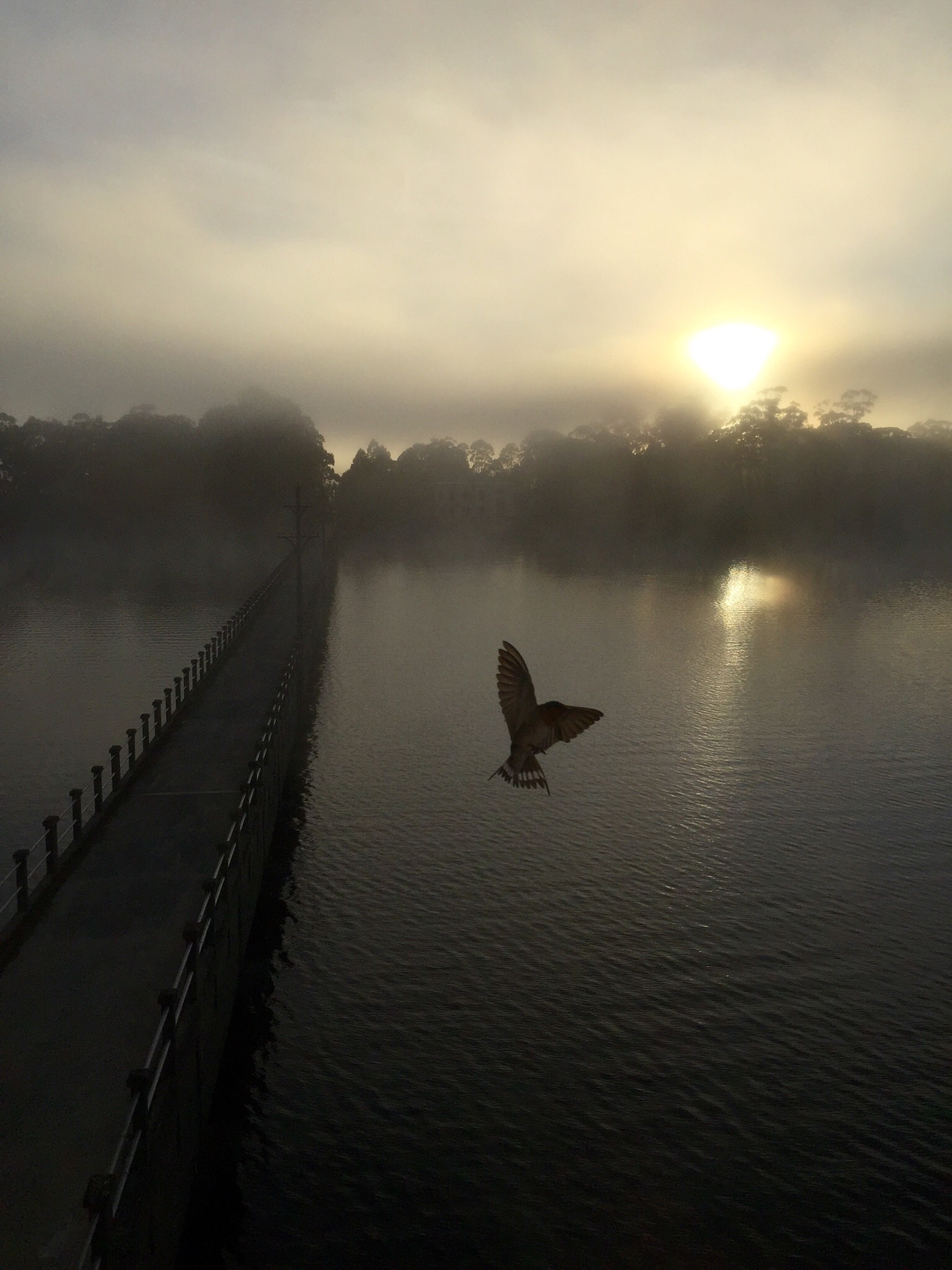
Swallow in the mist of dawn, Pumphouse Point, Lake St Clair

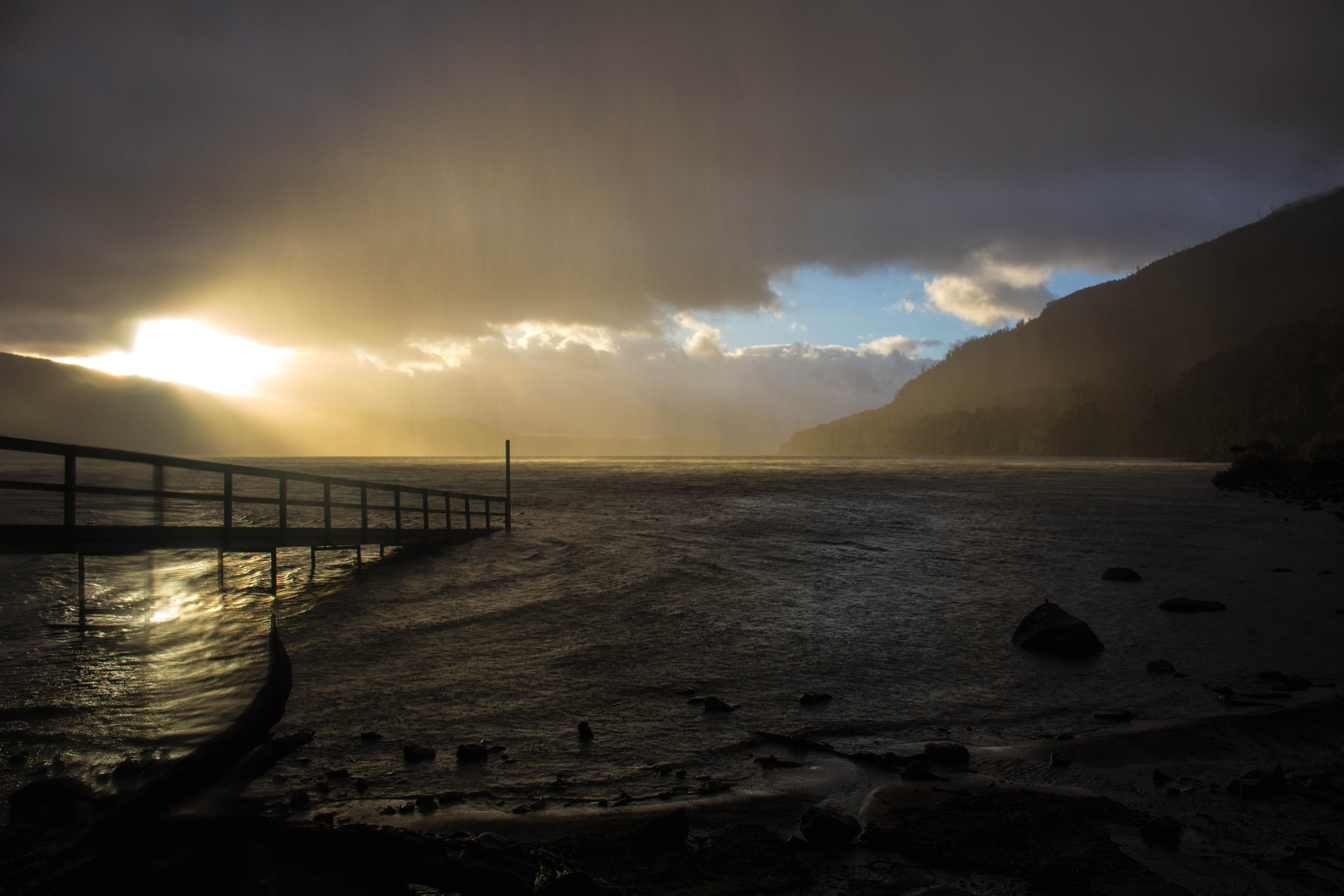
Echo Point, Lake St Clair at dawn
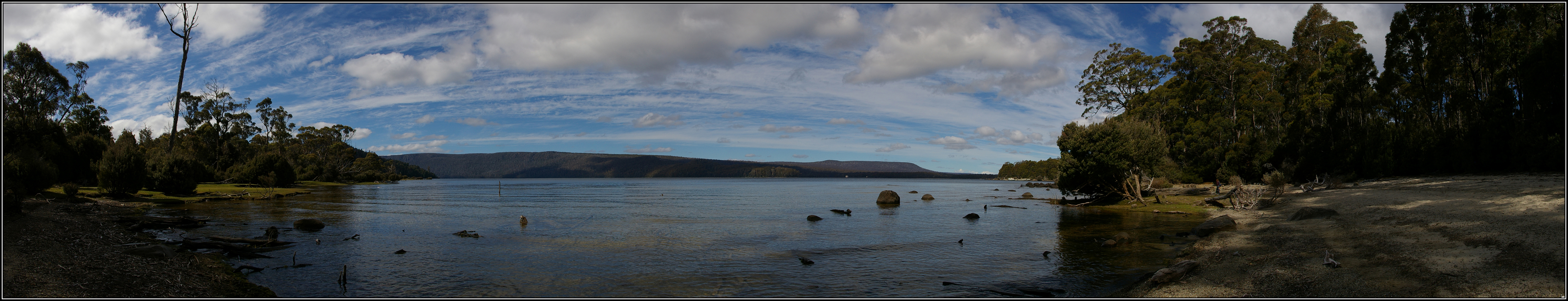
Summer afternoon, Lake St Clair panorama

== See also ==
- List of reservoirs and dams in Australia § Tasmania
- List of lakes of Australia § Tasmania
- Overland Track
